= Spanish corvette Vencedora (1861) =

Spanish Navy screw corvette of 1862–1888

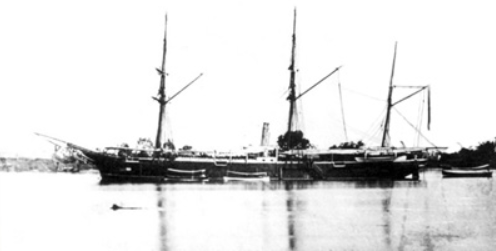

History

Spain
- Name: Vencedora
- Namesake: Victorious
- Builder: Arsenal de Cartagena, Cartagena, Spain
- Cost: 1,212,764.44 pesetas
- Laid down: 1859
- Launched: 1861
- Commissioned: 1862
- Decommissioned: 1888
- Fate: Disarmed 1888

General characteristics
- Type: Screw corvette
- Displacement: 778 tonnes (766 long tons)
- Length: 58 m (190 ft 3 in)
- Installed power: 160 hp (119 kW) (nominal)
- Propulsion: Mixed sail and steam; One La Maquinista Terrestre y Marítima steam engine, one shaft
- Sail plan: Schooner rig
- Speed: 8 knots (15 km/h; 9.2 mph)
- Complement: 98 to 130
- Armament: 2 × 200 mm (7.9 in) 68-pounder smoothbore guns; 1 × 160 mm (6.3 in) 32-pounder smoothbore gun

Vencedora (English: Victorious) was a screw corvette of the Spanish Navy in commission from 1862 to 1888. She participated in the Chincha Islands War of 1865–1866 and in the Spanish–Moro conflict in the Philippines in the 1870s and 1880s.

== Characteristics ==
Vencedora was a Narváez-class screw corvette with a wooden hull and a schooner rig, and because of the latter some sources list her as a schooner. She had three masts and a bowsprit. She displaced 778 tons and was 58 metres (190 ft 3 in) long. She had a steam engine manufactured in Barcelona, Spain, by La Maquinista Terrestre y Marítima that was rated at a nominal 160 horsepower (119 kW), and she could reach a maximum speed of 8 knots (15 km/h; 9.2 mph). Her armament consisted of two 68-pounder (31 kg) 200-millimetre (7.9 in) smoothbore guns amidships and a 32-pounder (14.5 kg) 160-millimetre (6.3 in) smoothbore swivel gun on her bow. She had a crew of 98 to 130 men.

== Construction and commissioning ==
Vencedora was laid down at the Arsenal de Cartagena in Cartagena, Spain, in 1859 as a wooden-hulled screw frigate with mixed sail and steam propulsion. She was launched in 1861, and after fitting out was commissioned in 1862. Her total construction cost was 1,212,764.44 pesetas.

== Service history ==
=== 1862–1865 ===
Upon entering service, Vencedora was assigned to the Pacific Squadron and proceeded to the Río de la Plata (River Plate) on the coast of South America, arriving there in April 1862. With the squadron commander, Contralmirante (Counter admiral) Luis Hernández Pinzón Álvarez, and a scientific team composed of three zoologists, a geologist, a botanist, an anthropologist, a taxidermist, and a photographer aboard, the screw frigates Resolución (Pinzon's flagship) and Nuestra Señora del Triunfo departed Spain in August 1862 and rendezvoused with her at the Río de la Plata. The screw schooner Virgen de Covadonga soon joined the squadron.

Ordered to carry out both the political-military task of demonstrating a Spanish presence in the Americas and a scientific research mission, the four ships got underway from Montevideo, Uruguay, on 10 January 1863 and proceeded down the coast of Patagonia, passed the Falkland Islands, rounded Cape Horn on 6 February 1863, and entered the Pacific Ocean. They then stopped at the Chiloé Archipelago off the coast of Chile before continuing their voyage up the coasts of South America and North America, stopping at several ports before calling at San Francisco, California, in the United States from 9 October to 1 November 1863. They then headed southward and arrived at Valparaíso, Chile, on 13 January 1864.

At the time, Spain still had not recognized the independence of Chile and Peru from the Spanish Empire, and the presence of the Spanish warships on the Pacific coast of South America – especially in the aftermath of Spain's annexation of the First Dominican Republic in 1861 and Spanish involvement in a multinational intervention in Mexico in 1861–1862 – raised suspicions in South America as to the intentions of the Spanish government. In retaliation for various hostile actions against Spanish citizens and property in Peru, Pinzón's squadron seized the Chincha Islands from Peru on 14 April 1864 without authorization from the Spanish government, taking several Peruvians prisoner. With tensions spiking between Spain and Peru, Resolución and Nuestra Señora del Triunfo covered an operation in which many of the Spaniards in Peru embarked on the steamer Heredia at Callao and Virgen de Covadonga towed Heredia out of the harbor under the guns of Peruvian Navy warships that were ready to open fire. Spain and Peru avoided war, but Pinzón resigned his command on 9 November 1864 because he felt that the Spanish government had not supported his actions, and Vicealmirante (Vice admiral) José Manuel Pareja took charge of the Pacific Squadron.

An accidental fire destroyed Nuestra Señora del Triunfo on 25 November 1864, but Pareja's squadron received reinforcements on 30 December 1864 when the screw frigates Berenguela, Reina Blanca, and Villa de Madrid joined it. Tensions with Peru remained high, and a member of Resolución′s crew was killed while on leave at Callao. Pareja attempted to settle affairs with Peru by signing the Vivanco–Pareja Treaty with a Peruvian government representative aboard Villa de Madrid (Pareja's flagship), but the Peruvian Congress viewed it as a humiliation and refused to ratify it, and the failed treaty instead sparked the outbreak of the Peruvian Civil War of 1865 in February 1865.

Vencedora was at Valparaíso on 28 April 1865 when the armoured frigate Numancia and the transport steamer Marqués de la Victoria arrived there from Spain as reinforcements for the Pacific Squadron. Numancia′s commanding officer, Capitán de navío (Ship-of-the-line captain) Casto Méndez Núñez, gathered information from Vencedora′s commanding officer, learning that Spain had reached an agreement with Peru to avoid war and that the Pacific Squadron was at Callao, and Numancia and Marqués de la Victoria got back underway and rendezvoused with the squadron at Callao on 5 May 1865.

=== Chincha Islands War ===
The political situation in the southeastern Pacific further deteriorated during 1865 when Pareja steamed to Valparaíso to settle Spanish claims against Chile. When Chile refused to settle, Pareja announced a blockade of Chilean ports, and the Chincha Islands War broke out between Spain and Chile on 24 September 1865. The blockade spread the Pacific Squadron thinly along the Chilean coast. Early setbacks in the war culminating in a humiliating Spanish naval defeat in the Battle of Papudo on 26 November 1865, in which the Chilean Navy corvette Esmeralda captured Virgen de Covadonga, prompted Pareja to commit suicide aboard Villa de Madrid off Valparaíso, shooting himself in his cabin on 28 November 1865 while lying on his bed wearing his dress uniform. He was buried at sea, and Méndez Núñez took command of the Pacific Squadron on 12 December 1865 and transferred to Villa de Madrid. Méndez Núñez concentrated his squadron off Valparaíso, where Vencedora and Resolución joined it on 19 December 1865. A few days later, Méndez Núñez limited the blockade to Valparaíso and Caldera. After bringing aboard supplies from a newly arrived Spanish frigate, Méndez Núñez's squadron began operations to find and recapture Virgen de Covadonga. The squadron first searched the Juan Fernández Islands and then Puerto Inglés on Chiloé Island in the Chiloé Archipelago off Chile without finding her.

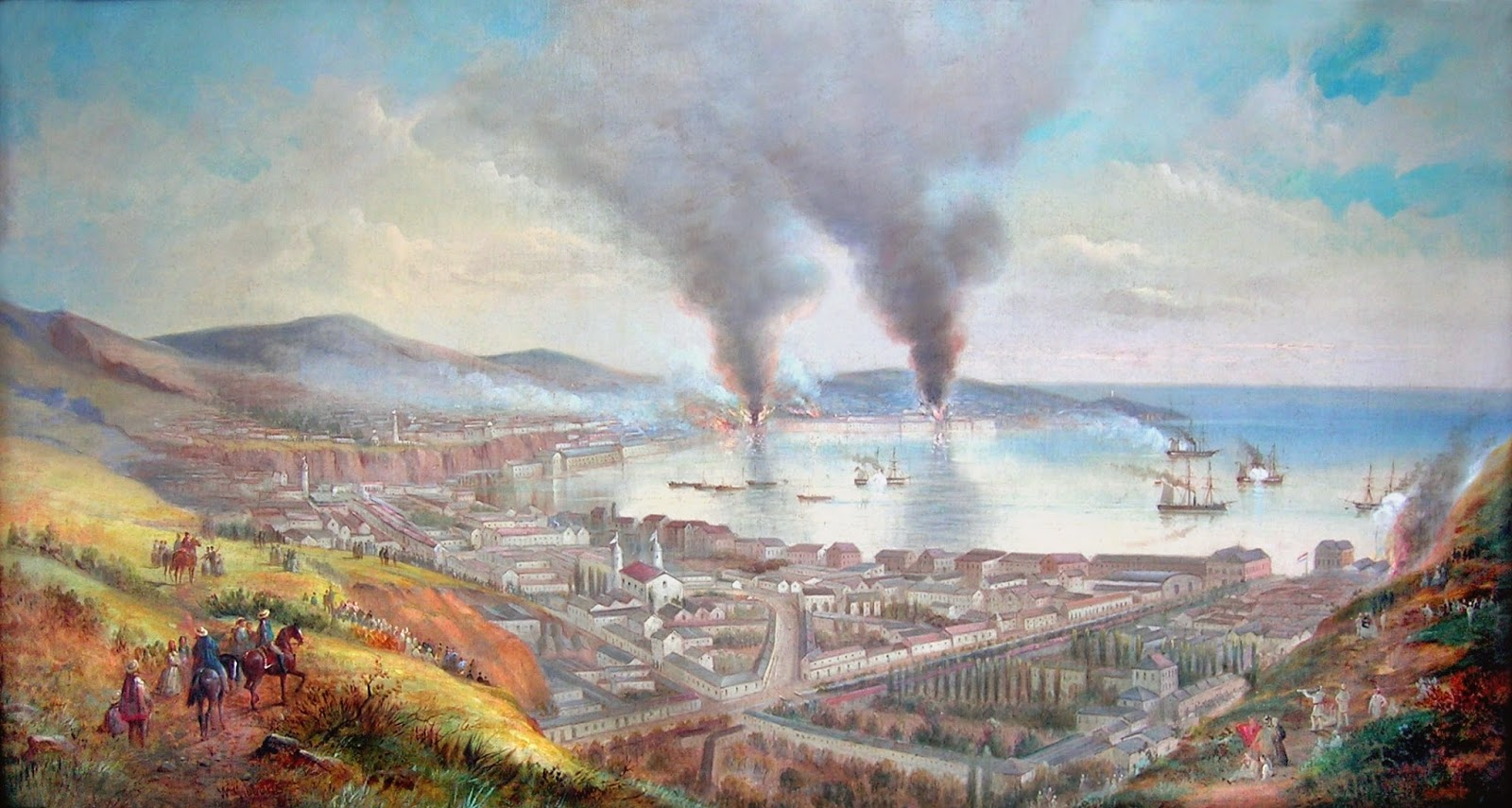
Valparaíso Chile during the bombardment by the admiral Méndez Núñez. (Painting by William Gibbons, ca. 1870)

Peru joined the war on Chile's side on 14 January 1866, as did Ecuador on 30 January. In February and March 1866, Méndez Núñez made two unsuccessful attempts – the first by Villa de Madrid and Reina Blanca and the second by Numancia and Reina Blanca — to destroy the combined Chilean-Peruvian squadron in the waters off Chile. Bolivia joined the war against Spain on 22 March 1866, closing all the Pacific ports of South America south of Colombia to Spanish ships. Under orders to take punitive action against South American ports, Méndez Núñez selected undefended Valparaíso as his target, although he found the idea of attacking an undefended port repugnant. On the morning of 31 March 1866 his squadron arrived at Valparaíso. Numancia fired two shots ay 08:00 to signal the rest of the squadron to open fire, then withdrew to a rearward position to cover the other ships and took no further part in the bombardment, instead standing by to intervene if any foreign warships at Valparaíso tried to interfere. Facing no opposition, Resolución, Reina Blanca, Villa de Madrid, and Vencedora began a three-hour bombardment of Valparaíso at 09:00 while Berenguela and the sidewheel paddle steamer Paquete de Maule stood by offshore to guard against any attempt at escape by Chilean merchant ships. By the time it ended at 12:00, the bombardment had killed two people, injured 10, and sunk 33 merchant ships in the harbor, destroying Chile's merchant fleet. It inflicted US$10 million (equivalent to about US$224 million in 2011) in damage.

Méndez Núñez chose the heavily defended port of Callao, Peru, for his next attack. He divided the squadron into two divisions, the first made up of Berenguela, Numancia, Reina Blanca, Vencedora, and three auxiliary steamers and the second of Resolución, Villa de Madrid, the screw frigate Almansa, Paquete de Maule, and three transport frigates and, after burning prize ships his squadron had captured, set off on 14 April 1866 for San Lorenzo Island off Callao, the second division getting underway at 09:00 and the first division at 16:00. The first division made the voyage under steam and arrived at San Lorenzo Island on 25 April, while the second division, making the journey under sail and delayed by the low speed of one of the transport frigates, arrived on 27 April 1866. Several days of negotiations began on 26 April, during which Méndez Núñez granted neutral countries a four-day delay in his attack to give them time to salvage their interests in Callao. The Spanish ships used the delay to prepare for the attack: The frigates all lowered their topmasts and main yards and altered their rigging to reduce the likelihood of damage to their masts, set up on-board field hospitals, and painted over the white stripes on their hulls with black paint to reduce the ships' visibility and give Peruvian gunners less of an aiming point.

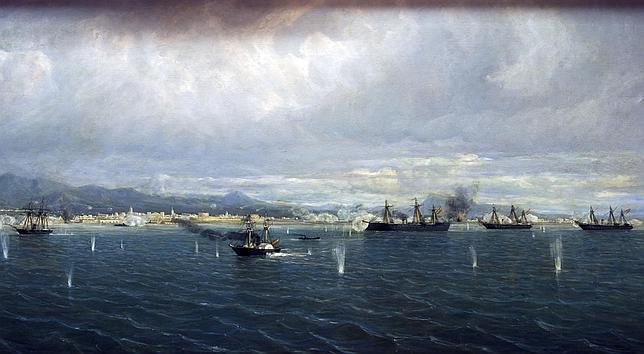
The 19th-century painting The Battle of Callao by Rafael Monleón y Torres (1843–1900). Numancia is at center.

On the morning of 2 May 1866 the Spanish ships entered Callao Bay, beginning the Battle of Callao, the largest battle of the Chincha Islands War. Vencedora and the auxiliary ships stood off near San Lorenzo Island while the other six Spanish ships attacked Callao, with Resolución, Numancia, and Almansa assigned to bombard the northern part of the harbor while Reina Blanca, Berenguela, and Villa de Madrid shelled the southern part. Numancia fired the first shot at 11:55, and soon all the Spanish ships were exchanging fire with the Peruvian fortifications. After Villa de Madrid was disabled when a 450-pound (204 kg) Peruvian projectile destroyed her boilers, Vencedora came to her assistance under fire, towing her out of danger to San Lorenzo Island. By 16:00, only three Peruvian guns still were firing, and Méndez Núñez ordered Numancia, Almansa, Resolución, and Vencedora to shift fire from the harbor defenses to the city itself, but he rescinded the order after his officers advised him that his squadron had run low on explosive shells and would have to use solid shot, which would be ineffective. Running low on ammunition and with only the last three Peruvian guns still firing, the Spanish squadron ceased fire at 16:40 as dusk fell and fog began to form in the harbor. Although one of her three guns broke down at the beginning of the battle, Vencedora fired 114 rounds and emerged from the engagement undamaged, the only Spanish ship that suffered no hits from Peruvian gunfire.

Méndez Núñez's squadron spent the next several days at San Lorenzo Island, making repairs and tending to casualties. The Chincha Islands War ended in a ceasefire on 9 May 1866, and on 10 May 1866, Mendez Núñez's squadron burned and scuttled Paquete de Maule near San Lorenzo Island and departed. Deeming the stormy waters off Cape Horn dangerous for Numancia during winter,Méndez Núñez divided the squadron, sending Berenguela, Numancia, Vencedora, and three auxiliary ships westward across the Pacific Ocean to the Philippines in the Spanish East Indies while he led the rest of the ships on a voyage eastward around Cape Horn to Rio de Janeiro, Brazil, with Villa de Madrid as his flagship.

After getting underway from San Lorenzo Island, the Philippines-bound division parted company with the other ships. Numancia was slow under sail, forcing the other ships to use reduced sail so as not to leave her behind. After the first case of scurvy was detected among Berenguela′s crew, however, she and Uncle Sam parted company with Numancia on 15 May 1866 and headed for Papeete on Tahiti in the Society Islands, as did Vencedora on 19 May. On 9 June Berenguela arrived at Papeete, and the rest of the ships straggled in behind her, the last of them, Numancia, arriving on 24 June. After provisioning, fueling, and treating their sick crewmen, the ships resumed their voyage to the Philippines on 17 July 1866. Numancia arrived in the Philippines at Manila on 8 September 1866, Berenguela joined her there on 24 September, and on 13 October 1866 the division's last ship reached Manila.

=== Philippines ===
After arriving in the Philippines, she was assigned to the Philippines station, where the Spanish-Moro conflict had been underway since the 16th century. As part of the squadron of Contralmirante (Counter Admiral) Manuel Mac-Crohon y Blake, which also included Berenguela (his flagship) and the screw corvettes Wad-Ras and Santa Lucia, Vencedora got underway from Cavite on Luzon on 23 December 1871 for an expedition against Moro pirates in Parang and Jolo. The operations ended with the defeat of the pirates in Jolo on 29 February 1872.

On 6 April 1874, Vencedora landed members of her crew at Patean on Jolo to combat Moro pirates. Subsequently, Vencedora, Santa Lucia, the screw schooner Santa Filomena and three gunboats departed Zamboanga Mindoro and conducted another operation against Moro pirates on Jolo on 12 April 1874, capturing numerous pirate ships and canoes.

In 1876, Vencedora took part in another expedition to Jolo to attack Moro pirates as part of a squadron commanded by Contralmirante (Counter Admiral) Manuel de la Pezuela, which resulted in Spanish forces occupying the island at the beginning of April 1876.

On 26 October 1882, a Spanish squadron composed of Vencedora, the unprotected cruisers Aragón, Gravina, and Velasco, the screw schooner Sirena, and the gunboats Arayak and Paragua 2 got underway from Manila for operations against the Jolo pirates, carrying a landing force consisting of 490 Spanish Marine Infantry personnel and naval infantrymen, 105 men of the Iberia Infantry Regiment, 111 men of the Jolo Infantry Regiment, and 100 men of a Manila disciplinary company. After the squadron reconnoitered the coast, fighting began when the landing force went ashore at Looc on 29 October 1882. On 30 October the Spanish force landed at Padang-Padang. After conducting several raids, the troops returned to the ships and landed at Boal on 8 November 1882. The squadron and troops returned to Manila in mid-November 1882.

On 17 December 1882, Vencedora, Velasco, Sirena, and Arayak landed a force which occupied Tataan on Tariatavi between Jolo and Bongao with the consent of the Sultan of Jolo. A Spanish naval base subsequently was established on the island. Vencedora and the gunboat Mindanao 2 conducted a punitive operation against Moro pirates at Taglibi, sinking the pirate ships there with gunfire in exchange for four Spaniards killed in action.

Vencedora, Aragón, Gravina, Sirena, and Paragua 2 mounted another expedition against pirates in Jolo in November 1883. On 7 November, the ships bombarded Looc and the vicinity of Tapucan and Panlau-Panlau, then landed a force composed of two companies of Spanish Army soldiers totaling 810 men, a disciplinary company of 150 men, 70 convicts, Spanish marine infantrymen, and 400 sailors from the ships' crews. On 8 November the Spanish operations expanded to Boad. The Spanish force suffered two dead and 10 wounded. After reembarking the landing force, the ships returned to Zamboanga on 9 November 1883.

== Final disposition ==
Vencedora was decommissioned and disarmed in 1888.
