= Spanish frigate Berenguela =

Spanish Navy screw frigate of 1857–1877

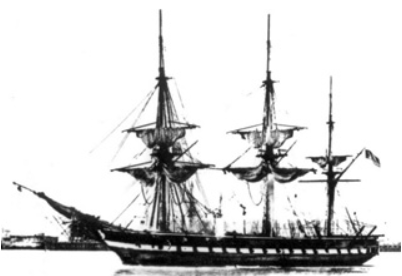

History

Spain
- Name: Berenguela
- Namesake: Berengaria of Castile
- Ordered: 8 or 9 October 1853
- Builder: Reales Astilleros de Esteiro, Ferrol, Spain
- Cost: 3,082,909 pesetas
- Laid down: 16 October 1854 or 4 April 1855 (see text)
- Launched: 24 February 1857
- Commissioned: September 1857
- Fate: Hulked 1875
- Decommissioned: 1877

General characteristics
- Type: Screw frigate
- Displacement: 2,600 or 3,800 tonnes (2,600 or 3,700 long tons)
- Length: 64 m (210 ft 0 in)
- Beam: 13 m (42 ft 8 in)
- Height: 7.22 m (23 ft 8 in)
- Draft: 6.35 m (20 ft 10 in)
- Installed power: 360 hp (268 kW) (nominal)
- Propulsion: Mixed sail and steam; One steam engine, one shaft, 234 t (230 lt; 258 st) coal
- Speed: 8 knots (15 km/h; 9.2 mph)
- Complement: 408
- Armament: 10 × 200 mm (7.9 in) 68-pounder smoothbore guns; 26 × 160 mm (6.3 in) 32-pounder rifled guns; 6 × bronze guns (for boats)

Berenguela (English: Berengaria) was a screw frigate of the Spanish Navy commissioned in 1857, the first screw frigate to enter service in the Spanish Navy. She took part in the multinational intervention in Mexico in 1861–1862, several actions during the Chincha Islands War of 1865–1866, and the Spanish-Moro conflict in the early 1870s and was the first Spanish Navy ship to transit the Suez Canal. She was disarmed in 1875 and decommissioned in 1877.

Berenguela was named for Berengaria of Castile (1179 or 1180–1246), who was Queen consort of León from 1197 to 1204 and Queen of Castile from June to August 1217.

== Construction and commissioning ==
Berenguela′s construction was authorized along with that of the screw frigates Petronila and Reina Blanca by a royal order of either 8 or 9 October 1853 (sources disagree). She was laid down at the Reales Astilleros de Esteiro in Ferrol, Spain, on either 16 October 1854 or 4 April 1855 (sources disagree) as a wooden-hulled screw frigate with mixed sail and steam propulsion. She was launched on 24 February 1857, and after fitting out she was commissioned in September 1857, the first screw frigate to enter service in the Spanish Navy. Her total construction cost was 3,082,909 pesetas.

== Service history ==
=== Early service ===
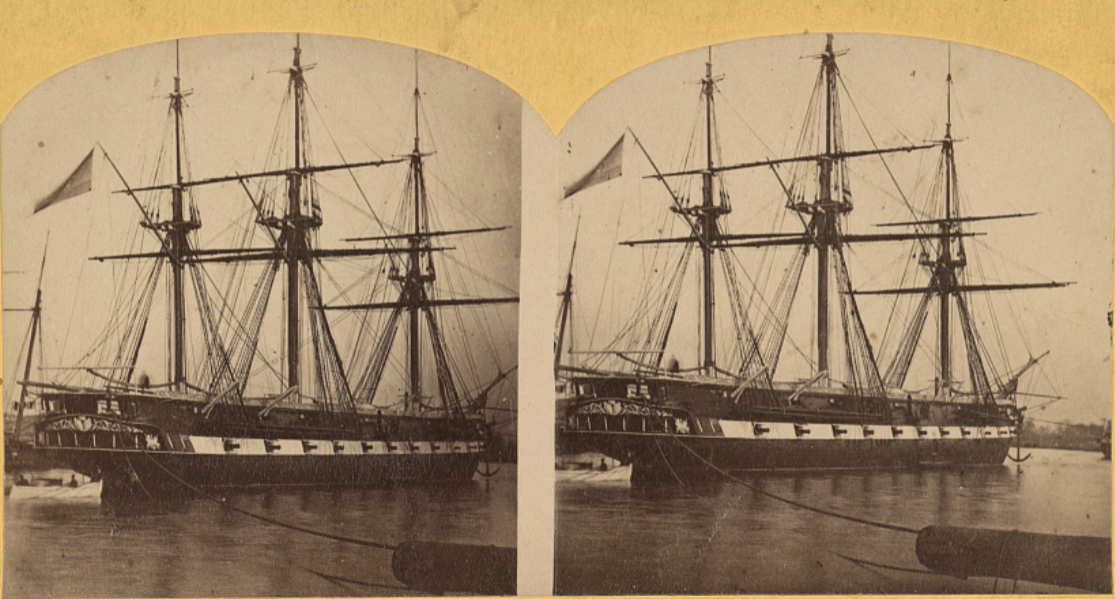
Both images from a stereograph of Berenguela anchored in New York Harbor off The Battery in November 1860.

After commissioning, Berenguela was assigned to service in the Caribbean, based at Havana in the Captaincy General of Cuba. In mid-November 1860, she arrived at New York City, anchoring in New York Harbor off The Battery in Manhattan. After the United States Navy screw frigate USS Wabash was floated out of drydock at the New York Navy Yard in Brooklyn, New York, Berenguela entered the drydock for an overhaul of her machinery. On the evening of 6 December 1860 two "medium-sized" shells lying on deck were ignited by sparks from a cigar and exploded. Two sailors jumped or were blown overboard and landed in the drydock, suffering fatal injuries, and the explosion also injured four others. A fire started, which the navy yard's firefighters quickly extinguished. Fortunately for Berenguela and her crew, two 80-pound (36 kg) shells lying near the explosion and fire did not explode.

Under the command of Capitán de navío (Ship-of-the-line captain) José Ignacio Rodríguez de Arias y Villavicencio, Berenguela took part in 1861 in a naval demonstration off Port-au-Prince, Haiti, by a squadron commanded by Joaquín Gutierrez de Rubalcava. She then participated in a mulitnational intervention in Mexico to settle damage claims in 1861–1862, again as part of a squadron under Gutierrez de Rubalcava. The Spanish ships seized Veracruz on 14 December 1861 and French and British forces arrived in January 1862. Spanish and British forces withdrew from Mexico in 1862 when it became apparent that France intended to seize control of Mexico, and Berenguela returned to Cuba.

=== Chincha Islands War ===
Amid tensions between Spain, Chile, and Peru, Berenguela was reassigned to the Pacific Squadron in 1864. Getting underway from Havana under the command of Capitán de navío (Ship-of-the-Line Captain) Manuel de la Pezuela y Lobo, she moved to Montevideo, Uruguay, where she and the screw frigate Reina Blanca rendezvoused with the screw frigate Villa de Madrid. The three ships passed through the Strait of Magellan into the Pacific Ocean and Berenguela reached Pisco, Peru, on 11 December 1864, then joined the Pacific Squadron in the Chincha Islands on 30 December 1864. Villa de Madrid became the flagship of the squadron's commander, Vicealmirante (Vice admiral) José Manuel Pareja, whose predecessor Luis Hernández-Pinzón Álvarez had seized the Chincha Islands from Peru in April 1864. On 27 January 1865 Pareja and a Peruvian government representative, Manuel Ignacio de Vivanco, signed the Preliminary Treaty of Peace and Friendship between Spain and Peru, known informally as the Vivanco–Pareja Treaty, aboard Villa de Madrid in an ultimately unsuccessful attempt to settle claims between the two countries that instead sparked the outbreak of the Peruvian Civil War of 1865.

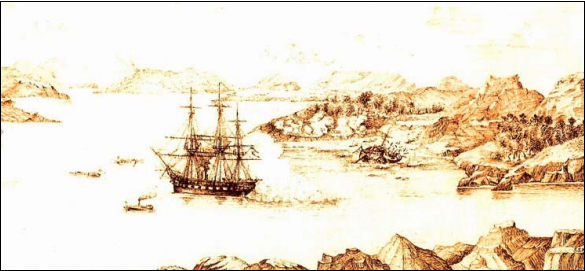
Berenguela destroying the steamer Maria Luisa while on blockade duty off Caldera, Chile, on 27 December 1865.

The political situation in the region further deteriorated during 1865 when Pareja steamed to Valparaíso, Chile, to settle Spanish claims. When Chile refused to settle, Pareja announced a blockade of Chilean ports, with Berenguela assigned to the blockade of Valparaíso. As a result of the blockade, the Chincha Islands War broke out between Spain and Chile on 24 September 1865. When the Chilean Navy corvettes Esmeralda and Maipú departed Valparaíso, Pareja reassigned Berenguela to join Reina Blanca in blockading Caldera. While on blockade duty, Berenguela captured the steamer Matías Cousiño, which was making a voyage from Lota to Lota Alto, Chile, with a cargo of coal. On 27 November 1865, a group of Chilean gunboats attacked Berenguela off Caldera, and Berenguela drove off the attackers with gunfire. The blockade spread the Pacific Squadron thinly along the Chilean coast, and early setbacks in the war culminated in a humiliating Spanish naval defeat in the Battle of Papudo on 26 November 1865 in which Esmeralda captured the Spanish Navy schooner Virgen de Covadonga. News of the defeat prompted Pareja to commit suicide aboard Villa de Madrid off Valparaíso, shooting himself in his cabin on 28 November 1865 while lying on his bed wearing his dress uniform. He was buried at sea.

Arriving from Callao, Peru, the armoured frigate Numancia rendezvoused with Berenguela and Villa de Madrid at Caldera, Chile, on 12 December 1865. Learning of Pareja's death, Numancia′s commanding officer, Contralmirante (Counter admiral) Casto Méndez Núñez, took charge of the Pacific Squadron that day and transferred to Villa de Madrid. By 19 December he had concentrated the Pacific Squadron off Valparaíso. A few days later, he limited the blockade to Valparaíso and Caldera.

After bringing aboard supplies from a newly arrived Spanish frigate, Méndez Núñez's squadron began operations to find and recapture Virgen de Covadonga. The squadron first searched the Juan Fernández Islands and then Puerto Inglés on Chiloé Island in the Chiloé Archipelago off Chile without finding her. At Puerto Inglés, however, a boarding party from Berenguela inspected a steamer which Berenguela sank after finding that she lacked documentation. Rifle fire from shore harassed the boarding party's boat, so Berenguela returned fire, bombarding the coastline until the rifle fire stopped.

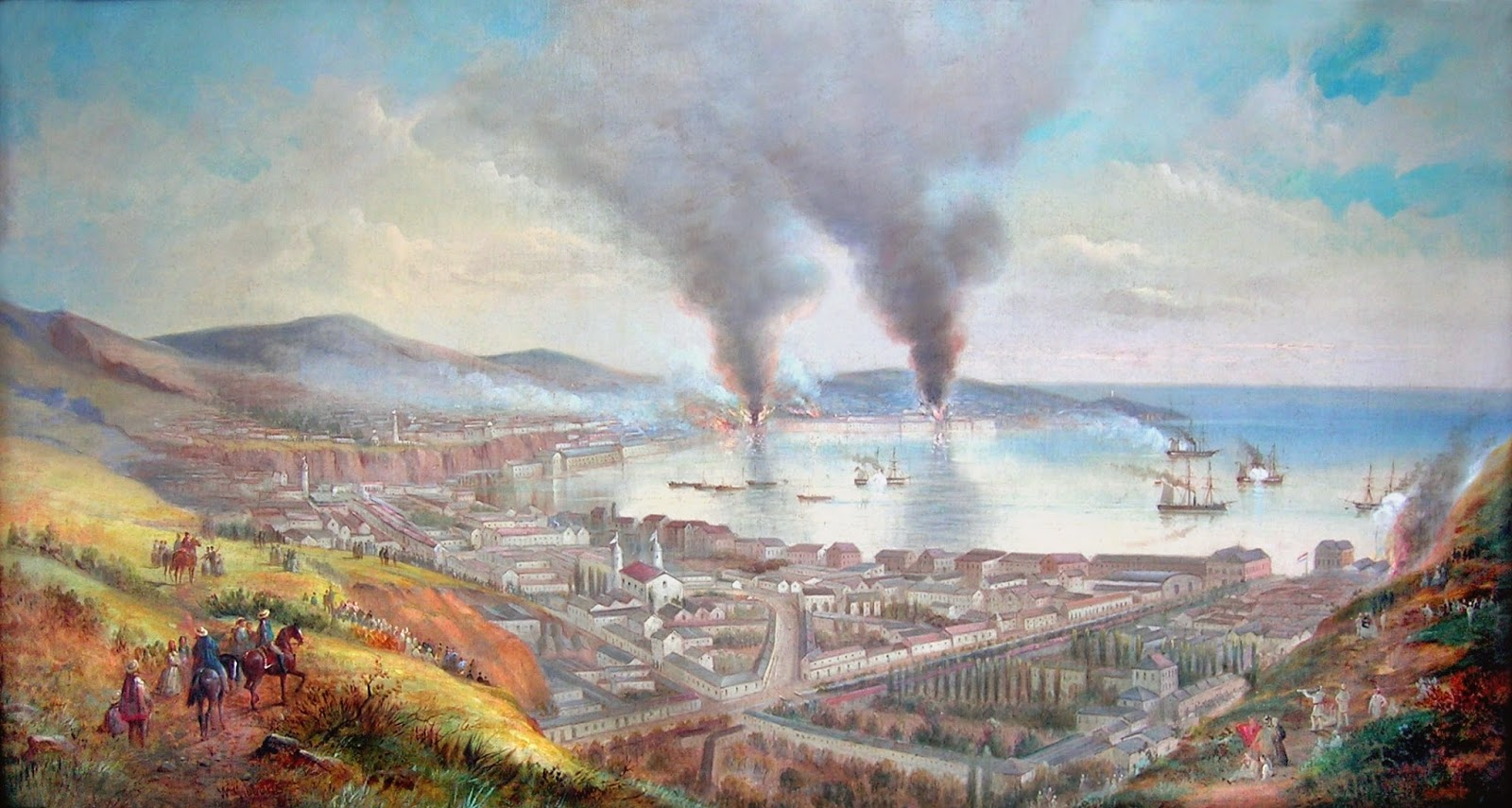
Valparaíso Chile during the bombardment by the admiral Méndez Núñez. (Painting by William Gibbons, ca. 1870)

Peru and Ecuador joined the war on Chile's side in January 1866. Méndez Núñez's attempts during February and March 1866 to bring the combined Chilean-Peruvian squadron to action failed. Bolivia joined the war against Spain on 22 March 1866, closing all the Pacific ports of South America south of Colombia to Spanish ships. Under orders to take punitive action against South American ports, Méndez Núñez selected undefended Valparaíso as his target, although he found the idea of attacking an undefended port repugnant. On the morning of 31 March 1866 his squadron arrived at Valparaíso. Numancia fired two shots at 08:00 to signal the rest of the squadron to open fire, then withdrew to an offshore position and took no further part in the bombardment, instead standing by to intervene if foreign warships which had gathered at the harbor's entrance attempted to interfere. The foreign ships remained passive observers and, facing no opposition, Reina Blanca, Villa de Madrid, the screw frigate Resolución, and the screw corvette Vencedora opened fire at 09:00 and conducted a three-hour bombardment of Valparaíso while Berenguela and the sidewheel paddle steamer Paquete de Maule stood by offshore to guard against any attempt at escape by Chilean merchant ships. By the time it ended at 12:00, the bombardment had killed two people, injured 10, and sunk 33 merchant ships in the harbor, destroying Chile's merchant fleet. It inflicted US$10 million (equivalent to about US$224 million in 2011) in damage.

Méndez Núñez chose the heavily defended port of Callao for his next attack. He divided the squadron into two divisions, the first made up of Berenguela, Numancia, Reina Blanca, Vencedora, and three auxiliary steamers and the second of Villa de Madrid, Resolución, the screw frigate Almansa, Paquete de Maule, and three transport frigates and, after burning prize ships his squadron had captured, set off on 14 April 1866 for San Lorenzo Island off Callao, the second division getting underway at 09:00 and the first division at 16:00. The first division made the voyage under steam and arrived at San Lorenzo Island on 25 April, while the second division, making the journey under sail and delayed by the low speed of one of the transport frigates, arrived on 27 April 1866. Several days of negotiations began on 26 April, during which Méndez Núñez granted neutral countries a four-day delay in his attack to give them time to salvage their interests in Callao. The Spanish ships used the delay to prepare for the attack: The frigates all lowered their topmasts and main yards and altered their rigging to reduce the likelihood of damage to their masts, set up on-board field hospitals, and painted over the white stripes on their hulls with black paint to reduce the ships' visibility and give Peruvian gunners less of an aiming point.

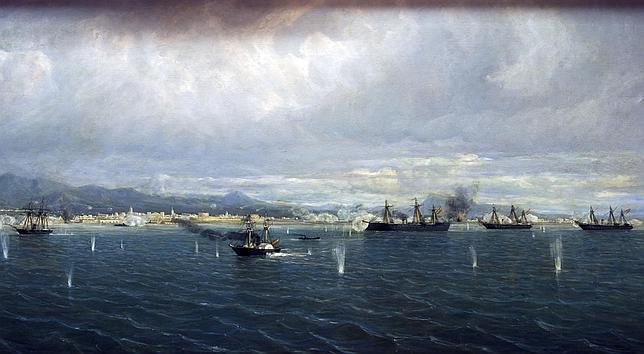
The 19th-century painting The Battle of Callao by Rafael Monleón y Torres (1843–1900). Numancia is at center.

On the morning of 2 May 1866 the Spanish ships entered Callao Bay, beginning the Battle of Callao, the largest battle of the Chincha Islands War. Vencedora and the auxiliary ships stood off near San Lorenzo Island while the other six Spanish ships attacked Callao, with Numancia, Almansa, and Resolución assigned to bombard the northern part of the harbor while Reina Blanca, Berenguela, and Villa de Madrid shelled the southern part. Numancia fired the first shot at 11:55, and soon all the Spanish ships were exchanging fire with the Peruvian fortifications. Berenguela suffered heavy damage: A 500-millimetre (19.7 in) 300-pound (136 kg) Blakely shell penetrated her side, passed through her battery, and exited below the waterline on her opposite side, killing 13 men and opening a 5-square-metre (54 sq ft) hole in her hull, and another shell seriously damaged her deck and started a fire in her coal bunker near her gunpowder store. She developed a list to port and pulled out of the firing line to withdraw to San Lorenzo Island. Running low on ammunition, the Spanish squadron ceased fire entirely at 16:40 as dusk fell and fog began to form in the harbor; by then all but three guns of the harbor defenses had been silenced.

Méndez Núñez's squadron spent the next several days at San Lorenzo Island, making repairs and tending to casualties. Berenuela′s crew dismantled a house on the island to use its wood to make repairs to the ship. On the night of 5 May 1866, a Peruvian steamboat armed with a torpedo attacked Berenguela, but the attack failed when Berenuela opened fire and captured the steamboat.

The Chincha Islands War ended in a ceasefire on 9 May 1866, and on 10 May 1866, Mendez Núñez's squadron burned and scuttled Paquete de Maule near San Lorenzo Island and departed. Méndez Núñez led most of the squadron on a voyage eastward around Cape Horn to Rio de Janeiro, Brazil, with Villa de Madrid as his flagship. However, Berenguela′s and Numancia′s temporary repairs at San Lorenzo Island were deemed inadequate for them to make the entire voyage safely, and Numancia also had exhausted her coal supply, so Méndez Núñez formed a separate division made up of Berenguela, Numancia, Vencedora, the steamers Marqués de la Victoria and Uncle Sam, and the sailing transport Matauara to proceed westward under sail across the Pacific Ocean to the Philippines in the Spanish East Indies, where Berenguela and Numancia could undergo permanent repairs.

Mendez Núñez's squadron got underway from San Lorenzo Island on 10 May 1866 and Berenguela and Numancia′s division parted company with the other ships to make its voyage to the Philippines. Numancia was slow under sail, forcing the other ships to use reduced sail so as not to leave her behind., After the first case of scurvy was detected among Berenguela′s crew, however, she and Uncle Sam parted company with Numancia on 15 May and headed for Papeete on Tahiti in the Society Islands, as did Vencedora on 19 May. On 9 June Berenguela arrived at Papeete, and the rest of the ships straggled in behind her, the last of them, Numancia, arriving on 24 June. After provisioning and fueling and treating their sick crewmen, the ships resumed their voyage to the Philippines on 17 July1866. Numancia arrived at Manila in the Philippines on 8 September 1866, Berenguela joined her there on 24 September, and on 13 October 1866 the division's last ship reached Manila. After completion of their repairs, Berenguela and Numancia departed Manila, rounded the Cape of Good Hope, and arrived at Rio de Janeiro, completing a circumnavigation of the world. They subsequently returned to Spain, arriving at Cádiz.

=== Later service ===
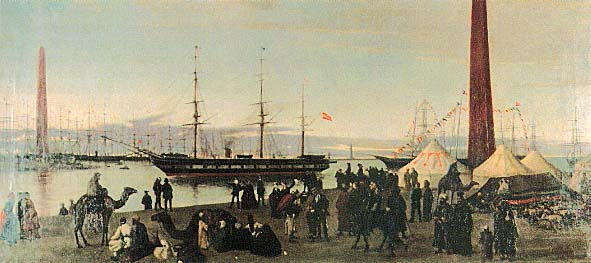
Berenguela transiting the Suez Canal in December 1869.

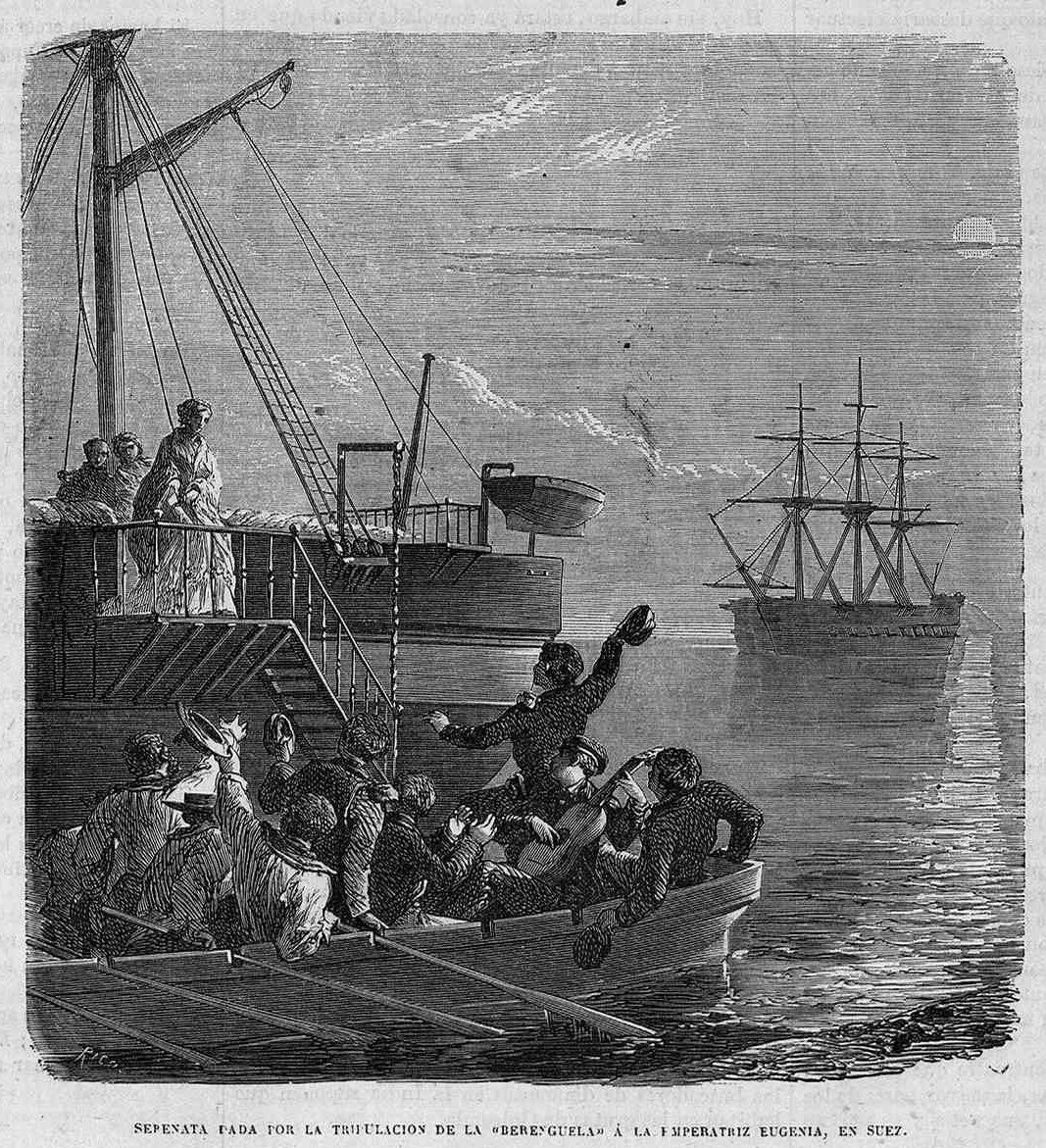
Members of Berenguela′s crew serenade the Empress Eugénie of France at Suez on 12 January 1870.

Berenguela was assigned to the Mediterranean Squadron in 1868. In 1869, she was assigned to duty in the Philippines. Planning to take advantage of the opening of the Suez Canal scheduled for November 1869 to shorten her voyage, she departed Cartagena, Spain, on 27 October 1869 under the command of Capitán de navío (Ship-of-the-Line Captain) Alejandro Arias Salgado Téllez. After crossing the Mediterranean Sea with stops at Malta and at Alexandria, Egypt, she proceeded to Port Said, Egypt, at the northern end of the new canal, where she anchored on 14 November 1869. Her draft prevented her from participating in the convoy of ships that inaugurated the canal on 17 November, and she had to unship her guns to keep her draft to a maximum of 5.8 metres (19 feet) so that she could pass through the canal as far as Ismailia. On 2 December 1869, she began her canal transit, becoming the first Spanish Navy ship to use the Suez Canal. After arriving at Ismailia, she unloaded most of her coal and other supplies to reduce her draft further before proceeding. She finally arrived at Suez on the southern end of the canal on 17 December 1869. There her guns, transported across the desert from Port Said on camels, were reinstalled.

Bereguela reached Manila in 1870, and joined the Spanish Navy squadron there, which was commanded by Contraalmirante (Counter Admiral) Manuel Mac-Crohon y Blake. During the ongoing Spanish-Moro conflict between the Spanish Empire and the Moro people, which had begun in the 16th century, she conducted several operations against the Jolo pirates, including bombardments of Parang and Maimbung. As Mac-Crohon's flagship, she got underway from Cavite on Luzon on 23 December 1871 as part of a squadron that also included Vencedora and the screw corvettes Santa Lucia and Wad-Ras for an expedition against the pirates at Parang and Jolo. The expedition culminated in the defeat of the pirates on Jolo and the Spanish occupation of the island on 29 February 1872.

== Final disposition ==
In 1875, Berenguela was disarmed and hulked as a floating dock at Cavite. She was decommissioned in 1877.
