= Spanish ironclad Méndez Núñez =

Spanish Navy armored corvette of 1869–1888

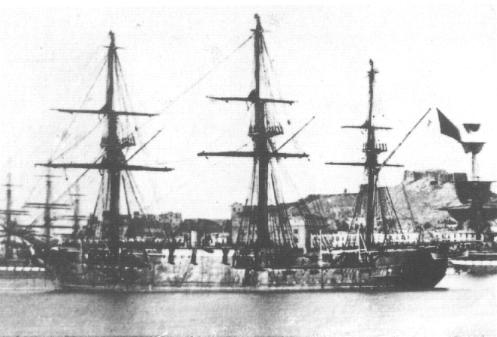
- Mendez Nuñez at anchor

History

Spain
- Name: Resolución
- Namesake: Resolution, a strong will
- Ordered: 14 September 1859 (authorized)
- Builder: Reales Astilleros de Esteiro, Ferrol
- Laid down: 22 September 1859
- Launched: 19 September 1861
- Completed: 28 August 1862
- Commissioned: 28 August 1862
- Refit: 13 February 1867 – 7 March 1870 (converted from screw frigate to armoured frigate at Arsenal de Cartagena, Cartagena, Spain)
- Renamed: Méndez Núñez, 21 August 1870
- Namesake: Casto Méndez Núñez (1824–1869), Spanish admiral
- Decommissioned: 14 June 1886
- Stricken: 1888
- Fate: Sold for scrapping March 1896

General characteristics (as wooden frigate)
- Type: Screw frigate
- Displacement: 3,200 t (3,100 long tons)
- Length: 70 m (229 ft 8 in)
- Beam: 14 m (45 ft 11 in)
- Draft: 6.16 m (20 ft 3 in)
- Depth: 7.33 m (24 ft 1 in)
- Installed power: 500 hp (373 kW) (nominal); 1,900 ihp (1,417 kW) (indicated)
- Propulsion: One John Penn and Sons steam engine, one shaft; 350 tons coal
- Speed: 11 knots (20 km/h; 13 mph)
- Complement: 500
- Armament: 15 x 68-pounder (31 kg) 200 mm (7.9 in) smoothbore guns; 26 x 32-pounder (14.5 kg) 160 mm (6.3 in) rifled guns; 2 x 150 mm (5.9 in) howitzers (for use in boats)

General characteristics (as ironclad)
- Type: Armoured frigate (Central battery ironclad)
- Displacement: 3,382 long tons (3,436 t)
- Length: 236 ft 2 in (71.98 m)
- Beam: 49 ft 3 in (15.01 m)
- Draft: 21 ft 11 in (6.7 m)
- Installed power: 2,250 ihp (1,678 kW)
- Propulsion: Compound-expansion steam engine, four boilers, one shaft; 400 long tons (410 t) coal
- Sail plan: Ship rig
- Speed: 8 knots (15 km/h; 9.2 mph)
- Complement: 417
- Armament: 4 × 9 in (229 mm) rifled muzzle-loaders; 2 × 8 in (203 mm) RML guns
- Armor: Belt: 127 mm (5 in); Battery: 127 mm (5 in)

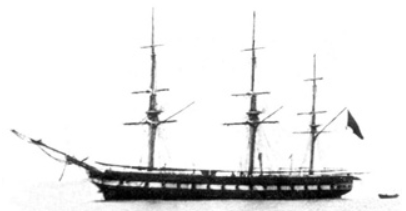
Resolución

Méndez Núñez was a Spanish Navy wooden-hulled armored corvette converted from the 38-gun screw frigate Resolución. As Resolución, the ship was commissioned in 1862 and participated in the Chincha Islands War of 1865–1866, taking part in the action of 17 November 1865, the bombardment of Valparaíso, and the Battle of Callao. Damage she sustained during the war and a subsequent circumnavigation of the world to return to Spain required major repairs, prompting the Spanish Navy to convert her into an ironclad warship between 1867 and 1870 and rename her Méndez Núñez in 1870. Captured by Cantonalist forces of the Canton of Cartagena during the Cantonal Rebellion of 1873—1874, she participated in the Battle of Portmán against a central government squadron in 1873 before she was returned to central government control after the Canton of Cartagena surrendered in January 1874. She was disarmed in 1880, decommissioned in 1886, stricken from the Navy List in 1888, and broken up in 1896.

== Resolución ==
=== Characteristics ===
Resolución was a Lealtad-class screw frigate with a wooden hull. She had three masts and a bowsprit. She displaced 3,200 tons. She was 70 metres (229 ft 8 in) long, 14 metres (45 ft 11 in) in beam, 7.33 metres (24 ft 1 in) in depth, and 6.16 metres (20 ft 3 in) in draft. She had a John Penn and Sons steam engine rated at a nominal 500 horsepower (373 kW) that generated 1,900 indicated horsepower (1,417 kW), giving her a speed of 11 knots (20 km/h; 13 mph). She could carry up to 350 tons of coal. Her armament consisted of fifteen 68-pounder (31 kg) 200-millimetre (7.9 in) smoothbore guns and twenty-six 32-pounder (14.5 kg) 160-millimetre (6.3 in) guns as well as two 150-millimetre (5.9 in) howitzers for disembarkation and use in her boats. She had a crew of 500 men.

=== Construction and commissioning ===
Resolución′s construction was authorized on 14 September 1859. Her keel was laid at the Reales Astilleros de Esteiro in Ferrol, Spain, on 22 September 1859. She was launched on 19 September 1861 and commissioned on 28 April 1862. Her construction cost was 3,661,741 pesetas.

=== Service history ===
==== 1862–1865 ====
Resolución′s first assignment was to the Training Squadron, which was under the overall command of Contralmirante (Counter Admiral) Luis Hernández-Pinzón Álvarez. The squadron was dissolved in June 1862, and Resolución and her sister ship Nuestra Señora del Triunfo were assigned to the Pacific Squadron. The two screw frigates entered the Arsenal de La Carraca at San Fernando to fit out for their deployment to the southeastern Pacific Ocean.

Resolución and Nuestra Señora del Triunfo departed Cádiz on 10 August 1862. Under the command of Pinzón, who flew his flag aboard Resolución, the two ships had both the political-military task of demonstrating a Spanish presence in the Americas and a scientific research mission and had three zoologists, a geologist, a botanist, an anthropologist, a taxidermist, and a photographer aboard. The two screw frigates stopped at the Canary Islands and Cape Verde and then crossed the Atlantic Ocean to Brazil before arriving at the Río de la Plata (River Plate), where they rendezvoused with the screw corvette Vencedora.

The screw schooner Virgen de Covadonga soon joined the expedition at the Río de la Plata as well. The four ships got underway from Montevideo on 10 January 1863 and proceeded down the coast of Patagonia, passed the Falkland Islands, rounded Cape Horn on 6 February 1863, and entered the Pacific Ocean. They then stopped at the Chiloé Archipelago off the coast of Chile before continuing their voyage up the coasts of South America and North America, stopping at several ports before calling at San Francisco, California, in the United States from 9 October to 1 November 1863. They then headed southward and arrived at Valparaíso, Chile, on 13 January 1864.

At the time, Spain still had not recognized the independence of Chile and Peru from the Spanish Empire, and the presence of the Spanish warships on the Pacific coast of South America – especially in the aftermath of Spain's annexation of the First Dominican Republic in 1861 and Spanish involvement in a multinational intervention Mexico in 1861–1862 – raised suspicions in South America as to the intentions of the Spanish government. In retaliation for various hostile actions against Spanish citizens and property in Peru, Pinzón's squadron seized the Chincha Islands from Peru on 14 April 1864 without authorization from the Spanish government, taking several Peruvians prisoner. With tensions spiking between Spain and Peru, Resolución and Nuestra Señora del Triunfo covered an operation in which many of the Spaniards in Peru embarked on the steamer Heredia at Callao and Virgen de Covadonga towed Heredia out of the harbor under the guns of Peruvian Navy warships that were ready to open fire. Spain and Peru avoided war, but Pinzón resigned his command on 9 November 1864 because he felt that the Spanish government had not supported his actions, and Vicealmirante (Vice Admiral) José Manuel Pareja took charge of the Pacific Squadron.

An accidental fire destroyed Nuestra Señora del Triunfo on 25 November 1864, but Pareja's squadron received reinforcements on 30 December 1864 when the screw frigates Berenguela, Reina Blanca, and Villa de Madrid joined it. Tensions with Peru remained high, and a member of Resolución′s crew was killed while on leave at Callao. Pareja attempted to settle affairs with Peru by signing the Vivanco–Pareja Treaty with a Peruvian government representative aboard Villa de Madrid (Pareja's flagship), but the Peruvian Congress viewed it as a humiliation and refused to ratify it, and the failed treaty instead sparked the outbreak of the Peruvian Civil War of 1865 in February 1865. In May 1865 the armoured frigate Numancia and the transport Marqués de la Victoria. arrived to reinforce the Pacific Squadron.

==== Chincha Islands War ====
The political situation in the southeastern Pacific further deteriorated during 1865 when Pareja steamed to Valparaíso to settle Spanish claims against Chile. When Chile refused to settle, Pareja announced a blockade of Chilean ports, and the Chincha Islands War broke out between Spain and Chile on 24 September 1865. The blockade spread the Pacific Squadron thinly along the Chilean coast. Resolución took on the responsibility of blockading the Bay of Concepción, and in the action of 17 November 1865 a Chilean tug captured one of Resolución′s boats, armed with two of her guns, off Tomé as it tried to interdict ship traffic in the bay. This action and other early setbacks in the war culminating in a humiliating Spanish naval defeat in the Battle of Papudo on 26 November 1865, in which the Chilean Navy corvette Esmeralda captured Virgen de Covadonga, prompted Pareja to commit suicide aboard Villa de Madrid off Valparaíso, shooting himself in his cabin on 28 November 1865 while lying on his bed wearing his dress uniform. He was buried at sea.

Arriving from Callao, Numancia rendezvoused with Villa de Madrid and Berenguela at Caldera, Chile, on 12 December 1865. Learning of Pareja's death, Numancia′s commanding officer, Contralmirante (Counter admiral) Casto Méndez Núñez, took charge of the Pacific Squadron that day and transferred to Villa de Madrid. After meeting with the commanding officers of the squadron's ships, Méndez Núñez concentrated his squadron off Valparaíso, where Resolución and Vencedora joined it on 19 December 1865. A few days later, Méndez Núñez limited the blockade to Valparaíso and Caldera. After bringing aboard supplies from a newly arrived Spanish frigate, Méndez Núñez's squadron began operations to find and recapture Virgen de Covadonga. The squadron first searched the Juan Fernández Islands and then Puerto Inglés on Chiloé Island in the Chiloé Archipelago off Chile without finding her.

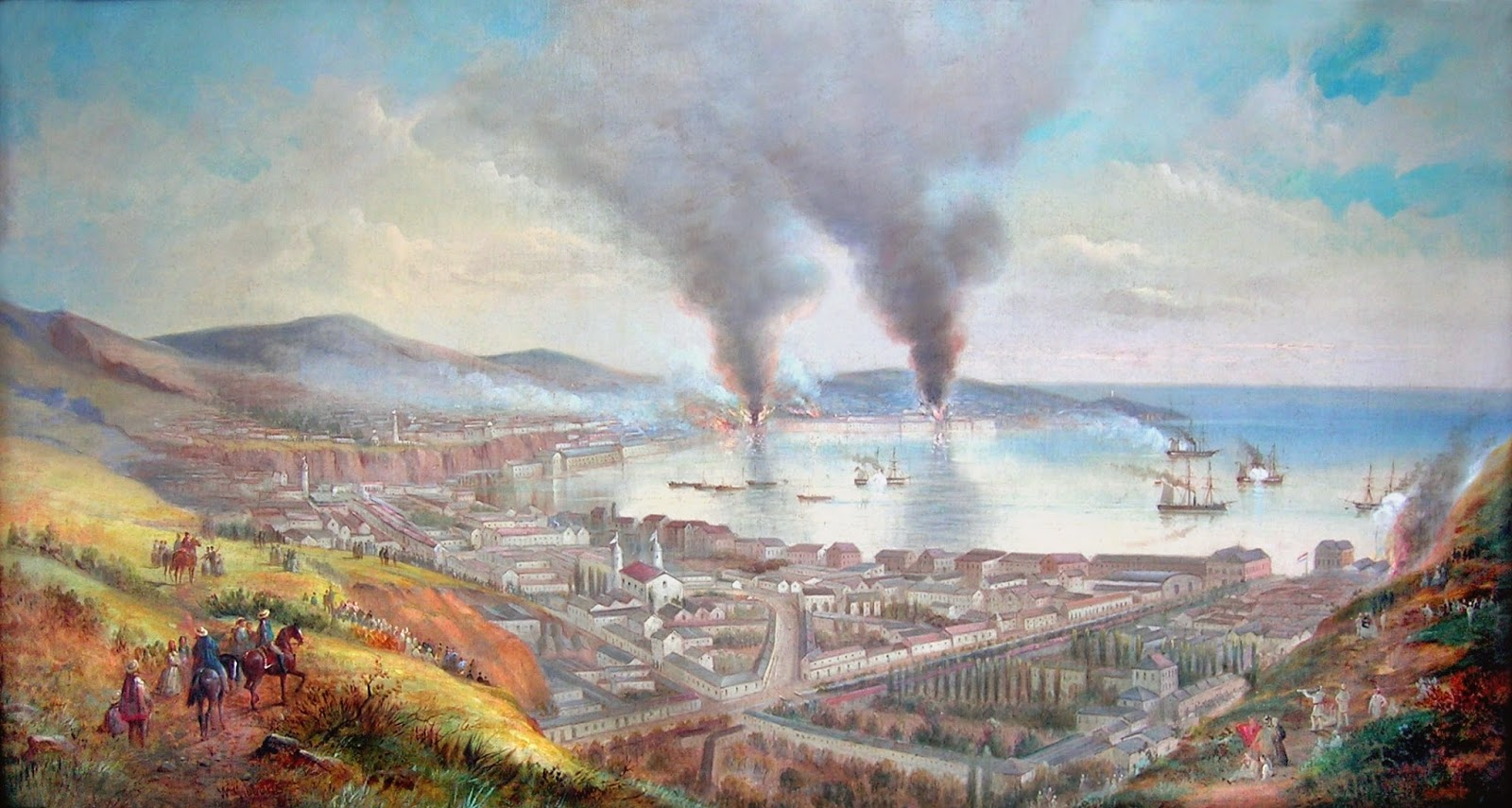
Valparaíso Chile during the bombardment by the admiral Méndez Núñez. (Painting by William Gibbons, ca. 1870)

Peru and Ecuador joined the war on Chile's side in January 1866. In February and March 1866, Méndez Núñez made two unsuccessful attempts – the first by Reina Blanca and Villa de Madrid and the second by Numancia and Reina Blanca — to destroy the combined Chilean-Peruvian squadron in the waters off Chile. Bolivia joined the war against Spain on 22 March 1866, closing all the Pacific ports of South America south of Colombia to Spanish ships. Under orders to take punitive action against South American ports, Méndez Núñez selected undefended Valparaíso as his target, although he found the idea of attacking an undefended port repugnant. On the morning of 31 March 1866 his squadron arrived at Valparaíso. Numancia fired two shots at 08:00 to signal the rest of the squadron to open fire, then withdrew offshore and took no further part in the bombardment, instead standing by to intervene if foreign warships gathered at the entrance to the harbor attempted to interfere. Facing no opposition, Resolución, Reina Blanca, Villa de Madrid, and Vencedora began a three-hour bombardment of Valparaíso at 09:00 while Berenguela and the sidewheel paddle steamer Paquete de Maule stood by offshore to guard against any attempt at escape by Chilean merchant ships. By the time it ended at 12:00, the bombardment had killed two people, injured 10, and sunk 33 merchant ships in the harbor, destroying Chile's merchant fleet. It inflicted US$10 million (equivalent to about US$224 million in 2011) in damage.

Méndez Núñez chose the heavily defended port of Callao, Peru, for his next attack. He divided the squadron into two divisions, the first made up of Berenguela, Numancia, Reina Blanca, Vencedora, and three auxiliary steamers and the second of Resolución, Villa de Madrid, the screw frigate Almansa, Paquete de Maule, and three transport frigates and, after burning prize ships his squadron had captured, set off on 14 April 1866 for San Lorenzo Island off Callao, the second division getting underway at 09:00 and the first division at 16:00. The first division made the voyage under steam and arrived at San Lorenzo Island on 25 April, while the second division, making the journey under sail and delayed by the low speed of one of the transport frigates, arrived on 27 April 1866. Several days of negotiations began on 26 April, during which Méndez Núñez granted neutral countries a four-day delay in his attack to give them time to salvage their interests in Callao. The Spanish ships used the delay to prepare for the attack: The frigates all lowered their topmasts and main yards and altered their rigging to reduce the likelihood of damage to their masts, set up on-board field hospitals, and painted over the white stripes on their hulls with black paint to reduce the ships' visibility and give Peruvian gunners less of an aiming point.

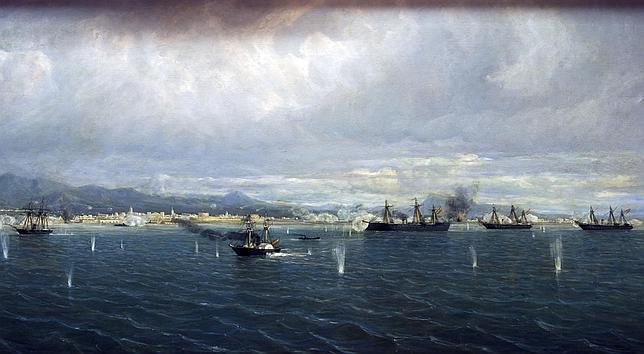
The 19th-century painting The Battle of Callao by Rafael Monleón y Torres (1843–1900). Numancia is at center.

On the morning of 2 May 1866 the Spanish ships entered Callao Bay, beginning the Battle of Callao, the largest battle of the Chincha Islands War. Vencedora and the auxiliary ships stood off near San Lorenzo Island while the other six Spanish ships attacked Callao, with Resolución, Numancia, and Almansa assigned to bombard the northern part of the harbor while Reina Blanca, Berenguela, and Villa de Madrid shelled the southern part. Numancia fired the first shot at 11:55, and soon all the Spanish ships were exchanging fire with the Peruvian fortifications. Resolución fired 1,304 rounds and was hit 19 times, suffering three killed in action and 11 wounded. Running low on ammunition, the Spanish squadron ceased fire entirely at 16:40 as dusk fell and fog began to form in the harbor; by then all but three guns of the harbor defenses had been silenced.

Méndez Núñez's squadron spent the next several days at San Lorenzo Island, making repairs and tending to casualties. The Chincha Islands War ended in a ceasefire on 9 May 1866, and on 10 May 1866, Mendez Núñez's squadron burned and scuttled Paquete de Maule near San Lorenzo Island and departed. Deeming Berenguela and Numancia too badly damaged to safely round Cape Horn in winter, Méndez Núñez divided the squadron, sending Berenguela, Numancia, Vencedora, and three auxiliary ships westward acriss the Pacific to the Philippines in the Spanish East Indies for repairs while he led the rest of the ships on an eastward voyage around Cape Horn to Rio de Janeiro, Brazil, with Villa de Madrid as his flagship. The ships rounded Cape Horn in winter, and Resolución experienced great difficulty during the voyage, including the loss of her rudder on 13 June 1866, leaving her adrift and in danger of sinking. She anchored at Sea Lion Island south of the Falkland Islands on 22 June 1866, and her commanding officer sent a boat to Port Stanley, 90 nautical miles (167 km; 104 mi) away on East Falkland Island, to seek assistance. The British steamer Spiteful was at Port Stanley, and after steaming to Sea Lion Island she towed Resolución to Port Stanley. While Resolución′s crew began the construction of a new rudder, her second-in-command took passage on Spiteful to Montevideo and Rio de Janeiro to inform Méndez Núñez of Resolución′s location and circumstances. Méndez Núñez dispatched the paddle gunboat Colón to Port Stanley with spare parts and materials. After completing temporary repairs, Resolución got underway from Port Stanley in company with Colón on 10 September 1866 and proceeded to Rio de Janeiro, arriving there on 7 October 1866.

After a rest period for her crew, Resolución got underway for Spain on 29 October 1866 in convoy with the store ship Trinidad. She arrived at Cartagena on the night of 31 December 1866. She entered the Arsenal de Cartagena for repairs early in 1867.

== Méndez Núñez ==
=== Conversion ===
On 11 February 1867, Resolución entered the floating Cartagena Iron Drydock, which had been commissioned less than a year before. She displaced only 2,000 tons when she entered dry dock, probably because her fuel, rigging, armament, and stores, and other parts had been unloaded. Rather than merely repair Resolución, the Spanish Navy rebuilt her as an armored corvette. Resolución′s conversion was ordered on 13 February 1867 and completed on 7 March 1870. She was in dry dock for almost four months, until 9 June 1867, and was renamed Méndez Núñez on 21 August 1870 in honor of Contralmirante (Counter Admiral) Casto Méndez Núñez, who had died one year earlier on 21 August 1869.

Méndez Núñez emerged from her conversion as an ironclad warship, 72.0 metres (236 ft 3 in) long at the waterline, with a beam of 15 metres (49 ft 4 in) and a mean draft of 6.7 metres (21 ft 11 in). She displaced 3,382 long tons (3,436 t). She had a single compound-expansion steam engine and four boilers that produced a 2,250 indicated horsepower (1,678 kW) and drove a single propeller, giving her a planned top speed of 8 knots (15 km/h; 9.2 mph), although she did not exceed 6.5 knots (12.0 km/h; 7.5 mph) during normal operations. She had three masts and was ship-rigged. She could carry up to 400 long tons (410 t) of coal.

Méndez Núñez was a central battery ship with her armament concentrated amidships. Her armament consisted of four Armstrong 9-inch (229 mm) and two 8-inch (203 mm) rifled muzzle-loading guns. Her wrought-iron armor covered most of her hull and was 127 millimetres (5 in) thick.

=== Service history ===
==== 1870–1872 ====
After completion of her conversion, Méndez Núñez entered service at Cartagena. In 1871 she was assigned to the Mediterranean Squadron. She remained with it until the end of 1872, when she was transferred to the Reserve Squadron.

==== Cantonal Rebellion ====
King Amadeo I abdicated and the First Spanish Republic was proclaimed in February 1873. Amid unrest under the new government, the Canton of Cartagena declared its independence from the republic on 12 July 1873, beginning the Cantonal Rebellion. The central government regarded the Cantonalists as separatists, and combat broke out between it and the Cantonalists. Méndez Núñez was anchored at the Arsenal de Cartagena base when the cantonal uprising broke out and came under Cantonalist control.

Almansa and the armoured frigate Vitoria, both also under Cantonalist control, steamed to Almería, Spain, to raise funds for the Canton and, when Almería refused to pay, they bombarded the city on 30 July 1873. The Spanish central government declared ships flying the red flag of the Canton to be engaged in piracy, and other naval powers made similar declarations and sent warships to Spanish waters to protect their interests. As Vitoria and Almansa headed from Almería toward Málaga, the British Royal Navy battleship HMS Swiftsure and the Imperial German Navy armoured frigate SMS Friedrich Carl detained them on 1 August 1873, then officially captured them as pirates on 2 August 1873. On 8 August, Méndez Núñez ran aground during an unsuccessful attempt to recapture Vitoria and Almansa. After laborious negotiations, Vitoria and Almansa were returned to the Spanish Navy at Gibraltar on 26 September 1873 and incorporated into Contralmirante (Counter Admiral) Miguel Lobo y Malagamba's central government squadron.

Méndez Núñez meanwhile continued to operate in support of the Canton. In mid-August 1873, she was patrolling in the harbor when she sighted and opened fire on the central government screw schooner Prosperidad. British Royal Navy forces, who viewed the waters in which Prosperidad was operating as neutral, intervened and escorted the outgunned Prosperidad to safety in international waters. On 17 September 1873, Méndez Núñez took part along with two other ships under Cantonal control — Numancia and the paddle gunboat Despertador del Cantón (known as Fernando el Católico in Spanish Navy service) — in a landing at Águilas to obtain food and money. On 27 September, Méndez Núñez, Numancia, and the Cantonalist armoured frigate Tetuán bombarded Alicante, suffering light damage when coastal artillery returned fire.

The central government squadron, composed of Vitoria, Almansa, the screw frigates Carmén and Navas de Tolosa, the paddle gunboats Colón and Ciudad de Cádiz, the screw corvette Diana, and Prosperidad, got underway from Gibraltar bound for Cartagena on 5 October 1873. News of the passage of this squadron through Almería reached Cartagena on 9 October, and the Cantonalist forces made plans to attack it. The Cantonalist forces lacked naval officers, so a cavalry general, Juan Contreras y Román, took command of the Canton's squadron, which consisted of Méndez Núñez, Numancia, Tetuán, and Despertador del Cantón.

On 10 October 1873, the central government squadron arrived off Cartagena to establish a blockade. During the evening of 10 October, Lobo kept his ships just outside Cartagena's harbor off of Escombreras. Later, during the night of 10–11 October, he ordered his ships to raise sail, probably to economize on their use of coal, and a strong north wind blew his squadron offshore and eastward to a position east of Portmán, Spain.

Flying the same flag of Spain as the central government squadron rather than the red Cantonal flag to avoid international antipiracy actions against its ships, the Cantonal squadron gathered on the morning of 11 October 1873 and got underway for the open sea at 10:30, escorted by five ships of the British Royal Navy, one of the Imperial German Navy, one of the Italian Regia Marina (Royal Navy), and one of the French Navy. At 11:30, the two squadrons sighted one another, with the Cantonal ships 3 nautical miles (5.6 km; 3.5 mi) due south of Cape Agua and Lobo's squadron about 6 nautical miles (11 km; 6.9 mi) to the south in waters east of Cape Negreti, and the Battle of Portmán began. Lobos, whose ships were in no particular order, ordered his squadron to turn to port with Vitoria in the lead. Numancia was faster than the other Cantonal ships, and she charged at Vitoria, racing ahead of the rest of her squadron. After exchanging fire with Vitoria, Numancia cut the central government line between Diana and Almansa, crossed astern of Carmén and Navas de Tolosa, and set off in pursuit of Ciudad de Cádiz. Vitoria broke off to chase Numancia, leaving Almansa, Carmén, and Navas de Tolosa to face the approaching Tetuán and Méndez Núñez.

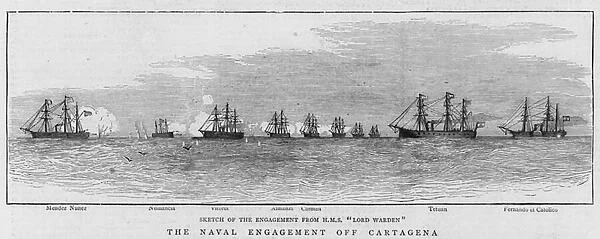
"The Naval Engagement off Cartagena." Drawing of the Battle of Portman published in The Graphic on 25 October 1873. Méndez Núñez is at left.

Méndez Núñez opened fire on Almansa and Vitoria at very long range at 12:19, and most of the shots did not cover even half the distance to her targets, but she then closed with Carmén, and Méndez Núñez and Carmén scored hits on one another. Méndez Núñez then responded to an order to come to the assistance of Numancia, which was fleeing toward Cartagena with Vitoria in hot pursuit. Almansa, Carmén, and Navas de Tolosa were steering toward Cartagena in the wake of Numancia and Vitoria, putting them on a converging course with Méndez Núñez. They exchanged fire with Méndez Núñez at very long range, but most of the shots were wild and neither side suffered damage. Méndez Núñez and Numancia both reached safety in Cartagena's harbor under cover of the guns of the coastal forts. Meanwhile, Tetuán exchanged fire with Vitoria, then engaged Almansa, Carmén, and Navas de Tolosa and appeared to hit Almansa six times without receiving any damage in return. Passing Almansa, Carmén, and Navas de Tolosa, Tetuán steamed toward Diana, but upon discovering that the other Cantonal ships had fled, she turned around off Cape Negreti and slowly steamed back towards Cartagena, again engaging in succession Carmén, Almansa, and Navas de Tolosa. After a close-range exchange of fire with Vitoria, Tetuán gained the safety of the harbor, as did Despertador del Cantón.

The central government squadron had exhausted its ammunition, and at around 15:00 Lobo withdrew it to the east, bringing the battle to a close. Reluctant to sink the Cantonalist ships, the central government ships generally had kept their distance during the battle and thwarted Cantonalist attempts to close with them. In the battle's immediate aftermath, the Cantonalists acknowledged that they had suffered 13 killed in action and 49 wounded, while Lobo claimed that his squadron had suffered no casualties, although one of his frigates reportedly withdrew eastward to "land the sick." Casualty figures eventually were revised to 11 dead and 32 wounded on the central government side and 12 dead and 38 wounded in the Cantonal squadron; one source claims that the Cantonalists suffered 13 dead and 49 wounded. Sustaining several hits from Vitoria, Méndez Núñez suffered four dead and 21 wounded.

After the battle, the central government squadron tried to blockade Cartagena. However, when the Cantonal squadron sortied again on 13 October 1873, Vitoria had only enough coal for two days' steaming. Méndez Nuñez reportedly ran aground while leaving Cartagena but was refloated, and the Cantonal squadron, under a new commander, maintained a disciplined formation with Numancia remaining in her position in the line despite her higher speed than that of the other two Cantonal frigates. Rather than engage the Cantonalists, Lobo chose to withdraw the central government squadron toward Gibraltar, expecting to receive reinforcement of his squadron in the form of the armored frigate Zaragoza and the paddle gunboat Ulloa. This withdrawal led the central government to dismiss Lobo and replace him as commander of the central government squadron with Contralmirante (Counter Admiral) Nicolás Chicarro.

Méndez Núñez, Numancia, and Despertador del Cantón departed Cartagena on 17 October 1873 to transport several Cantonal leaders to Valencia and Barcelona. During the voyage, Numancia collided with Despertador del Cantón off Alicante on either 19 or 20 October, according to different sources, and Despertador del Cantón sank with the loss of 12 lives and injuries to 17 others. After the accident, Numancia and Méndez Núñez returned to Cartagena.

Chicarro took command of the central government squadron on 18 October 1873 and reinstated the central government's blockade of Cartagena on 23 October 1873. Like Lobo, Chicarro avoided combat, despite the arrival of Zaragoza giving him a squadron that included two armored frigates. The Cantonal Rebellion collapsed and the Canton of Cartagena surrendered to central government forces on 12 January 1874. With the end of the rebelion, Méndez Núñez came back under the control of the Spanish Navy.

==== 1874–1896 ====
In 1880, Méndez Núñez was part of the Training Squadron, which was under the overall command of Contralmirante (Counter Admiral) José Polo de Bernabé. She was in Cartagena that year when she was declared unfit for service and disarmed, having lost the seaworthiness she had displayed as a screw frigate when she was converted into an ironclad. She was decommissioned by a Royal Order of 4 June 1886 and was hulked as a prison ship at the Arsenal de Cartagena until she was stricken from the naval register in 1888.

After she was stricken, Méndez Núñez was anchored at Mahón on Menorca in the Balearic Islands. In March 1896 she was sold there for scrapping.
