= Action of 17 November 1865 =

- Part of Chincha Islands War
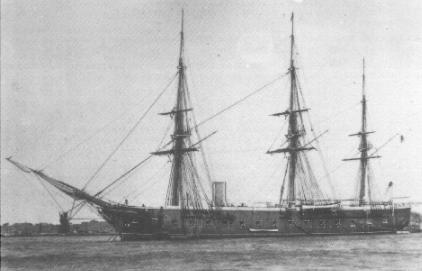
- The frigate Lealtad, twin of the frigate Resolución, to which the captured gunboat belonged
Date	17 November 1865
Location	Off Tomé, Concepción Bay, Chile 36°37′10″S 72°58′17″W
Result	Chilean victory

Belligerents
Spain	Chile

Strength
1 gunboat (2 guns)	1 tugboat (no guns)

Casualties and losses
Around 50 prisoners 1 gunboat captured	None

The action of 17 November 1865 was a minor naval engagement that took place off Tomé, during the Chincha Islands War. Chilean tugboat Independencia captured a Spanish gunboat who belonged to the frigate Resolución.

== Events ==
=== Background ===
On 24 September 1865, the Spanish admiral José Manuel Pareja declared the start of hostilities against Chile, resolving to establish the blockade of its ports due to the refusal of this country to accept the Spanish demands. This caused the Chilean government to declare war on Spain the next day, in response to Pareja's hostility.

The Spanish admiral wanted to blockade the entire Chilean coast with his warships, but due to its extension he had to limit himself with great difficulty to the ports of Valparaíso, Caldera, Coquimbo, La Herradura, Tomé and Talcahuano. In the first days of the war, the frigate Resolución was in charge of the blockade of the last two ports mentioned, in the Bay of Concepción, where there were also small ports that it had to harass to prevent the traffic of Chilean vessels.

=== Action ===
To optimize the blockade in the bay of Concepción, the Spanish of the Resolución armed a boat with two guns. The objective of this unit was to prevent the transit of small vessels from Talcahuano to Penco and Tomé.

On 17 November, off Tomé, the Chilean tugboat Independencia came dangerously close to the Spanish gunboat, which immediately began to attack her with its guns. The Chilean ship pretended to surrender, turned off the lights and stopped her steam engine. The Spanish approached and proceeded to board the tugboat to capture it, but at that moment they were surprised by a force of at least one hundred armed Chileans who were on board the ship. The Spanish were forced to surrender, and the gunboat was captured. Subsequently, the Spanish prize was sent by its captors to the port of Constitución.

=== Aftermath ===
This naval mishap was referred to by the Chilean newspaper El Mercurio, in the edition of 25 November 1865 and also in the American newspaper The New York Times in its edition of 1 January 1866. The Spanish newspaper La Época reported the event on 19 January 1866.

This action was part of a series of setbacks for the Spanish fleet while blockading Chilean ports. The blockade proved ineffective and added to other war failures, such as the battle of Papudo on 26 November 1865, which led the Spaniards to end the blockade of the ports in early 1866, with the sole exception of Valparaíso.

== Bibliography ==
- López Urrutia, Carlos (2007). Historia de la Marina de Chile (in Spanish) (2 ed.). Santiago, Chile: El Ciprés Editores. ISBN 978-0-6151-8574-3.
