= Spanish ship Triunfo =

Various Spanish Navy ships

Three ships of the Spanish Navy have borne the name Triunfo (Triumph):

- Spanish ship Triunfo (1718), a 60 or 66-gun ship of the line captured in 1718 and scuttled in 1719.
- Spanish frigate Triunfo (1735), a 24-gun gallery-frigate captured in 1739.
- Spanish frigate Nuestra Señora del Triunfo, sometimes referred to as Triunfo, a Lealtad-class screw frigate commissioned in 1862 and destroyed by fire in 1864.
