= Peruvian Civil War of 1865 =

Civil war in Peru

Date	28 February–8 November 1865
Location	Peru
Result	Revolutionary victory Government overthrown

Belligerents
Government of Peru	Revolutionaries

Commanders and leaders
Juan Antonio Pezet	Mariano Ignacio Prado; Pedro Diez Canseco; José Balta

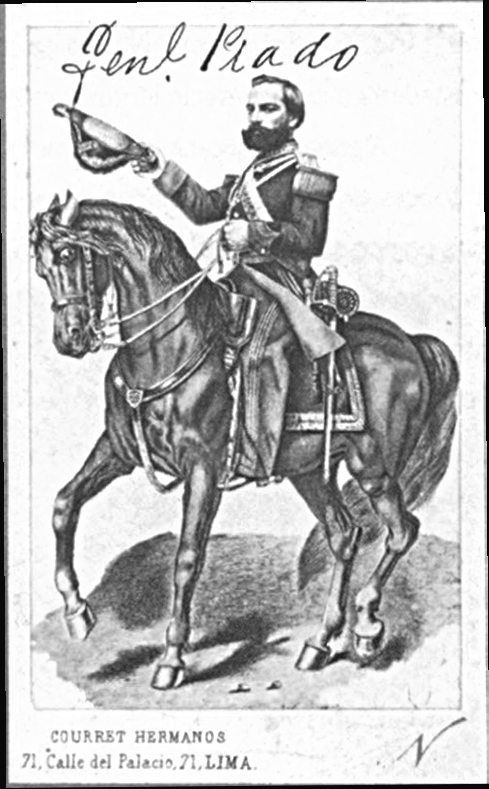
Image of the dictator Mariano Ignacio Prado printed on a card, circa 1866.

The Peruvian Civil War of 1865 was the fourth internal conflict in 19th century Peru.

== Background ==
On 14 April 1864, a Spanish fleet had seized the lightly defended Chincha Islands, the main source for Peruvian guano resources. Peruvian President Juan Antonio Pezet refused to go to war with Spain and sent General Manuel Ignacio de Vivanco to negotiate with the Spanish commander José Manuel Pareja. The resulting Vivanco-Pareja Treaty, favorable to Spain, was signed on 27 January 1865 on board the screw frigate Villa de Madrid. Popular opinion in Peru considered the treaty a humiliation and the Peruvian Congress refused to ratify it.

A general uprising followed on 28 February, led by Colonel Mariano Ignacio Prado, who took up arms against the Pezet government. He called his forces the "Restoration Army", a movement that would restore national pride.

== The Civil War ==
Prado marched towards Cuzco and Ayacucho in order to control all of southern Peru, thus preparing for the capture of the capital, Lima. Simultaneously, in Chiclayo in Northern Peru, Colonel José Balta also revolted, and marched with his troops towards Lima.

At the end of September of that same year, the two revolutionary armies of Balta and Prado, totaling 10,000 men, met in Chincha Alta south of Lima. Under the command of General Pedro Diez Canseco, the Restoration forces began to enter the capital in the early hours of 6 November, outwitting the government troops who were guarding the outskirts of the city. They entered the city through the Puerta de Juan Simón, which was forced open after only slight resistance. The populace joined the Revolutionaries and the Government Palace was attacked. After six hours of fighting, the resistance in the Palace was defeated, and it was looted and set on fire. In the following night, the Fort of Santa Catalina, where Pezet's Minister of Government, Evaristo Gómez Sánchez y Benavides had taken cover, fell after fierce resistance. That same day, the Revolutionaries also entered Callao.

Pezet, who was on the outskirts of Lima at the head of his troops, upon seeing the capital fall and contrary to the wishes of his generals, did not want to cause more bloodshed and renounced power on 8 November. Immediately afterwards, he took refuge along with his main collaborators on the British corvette Shear Water. Accused by the winning side of being a traitor and a thief, he embarked for Europe.

== Consequences ==
With the Restauration revolution triumphant, General Pedro Diez Canseco assumed power, but quickly lost his popularity, as he did not adopt the quick and drastic decisions that the citizens demanded regarding the problem with Spain. Diez Canseco maintained that it was Congress that should decide the declaration of war. He apparently wanted to gain time waiting for the arrival of the new warships acquired in Europe. Given his lack of thoroughness, the army chiefs deposed Diez Canseco on 25 November 1865 and proclaimed Colonel Mariano Ignacio Prado dictator.

Prado declared war on Spain on 14 January 1866 and allied Peru with Chile, a country that was already at war against the Spanish fleet. This South American alliance was later extended to Bolivia and Ecuador. The conflict ended after the Battle of Callao, with the withdrawal of the Spanish fleet on 2 May 1866. This event was celebrated by the four allied Republics as a triumph that sealed their independence.

== See also ==
- Chincha Islands War
