= Chincha Islands War =

1864–1879 war in South America

Spanish–South American War
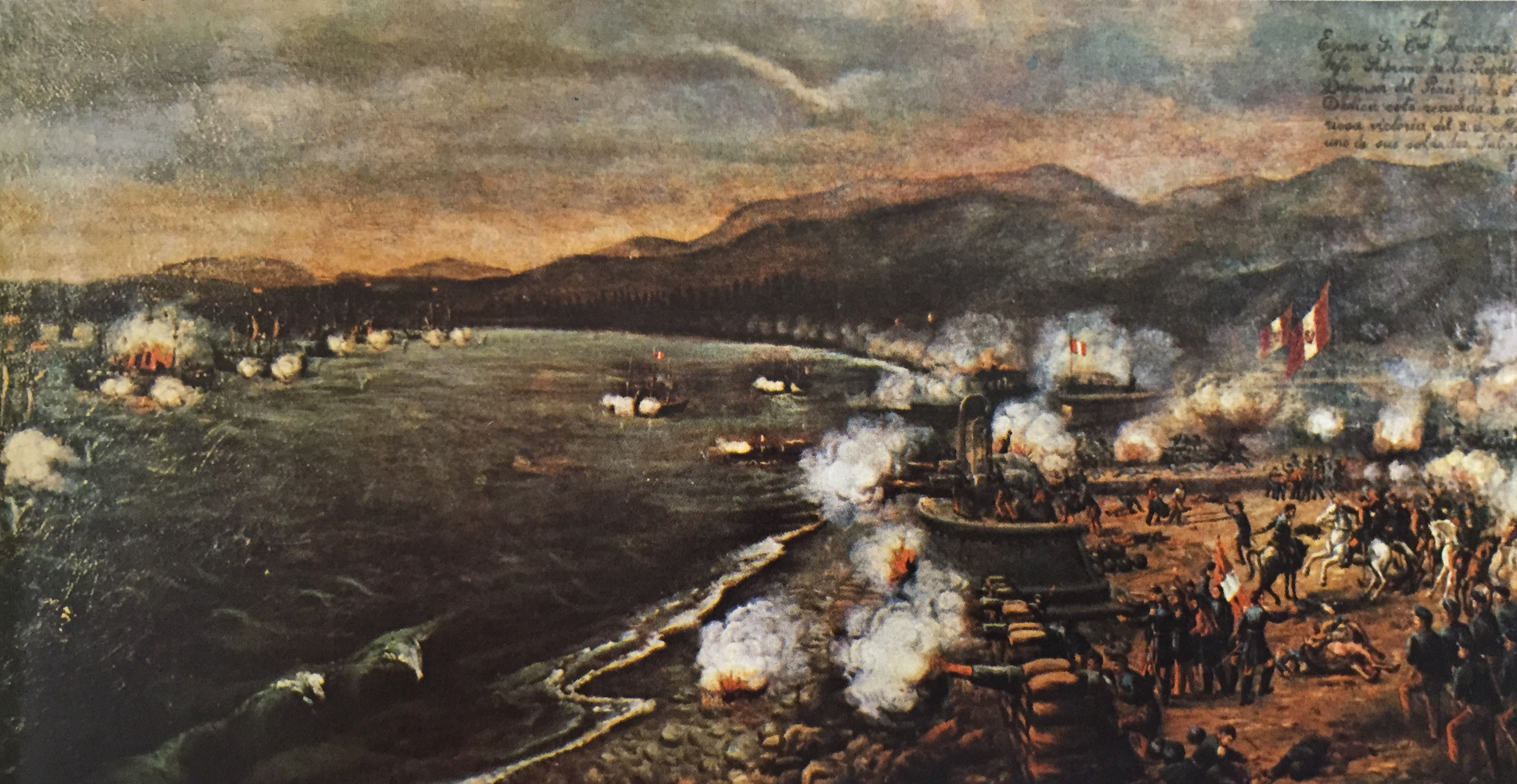
- Battle of Callao
Date	1865–1879
Location	Coasts of Chile and Peru, mainly
Result	Indefinite armistice of 1871; Peace treaties between Spain and Peru (1879), Bolivia (1879), Chile (1883) and Ecuador (1885).

Belligerents
Chile; Peru (since 1866); Nominal participation: Ecuador (since 1866); Bolivia (since 1866)	Spain; Supported by: Argentina (gave coal and aid to Spain)

Commanders and leaders
Mariano I. Prado; Juan Williams R.	José M. Pareja †; C. Méndez Núñez #

Casualties and losses
700	300

The Chincha Islands War, also known as Spanish–South American War (Spanish: Guerra hispano-sudamericana), was a series of coastal and naval battles between Spain and its former colonies of Peru, Chile, Ecuador, and Bolivia from 1865 to 1879. The conflict began with Spain's seizure of the guano-rich Chincha Islands in one of a series of attempts by Spain, under Isabella II, to reassert its influence over its former South American colonies. The war saw the use of ironclads, including the Spanish armoured frigate Numancia, the first ironclad to circumnavigate the world.

== Background ==
The guano-rich Chincha Islands of Peru in 1863

Military expenditures were greatly increased during Isabella's reign and Spain rose to a position as the world's fourth largest naval power. In the 1850s and 1860s, the Spanish engaged in colonial activities around the world, including in Morocco, the Philippines, Mexico, and the Dominican Republic, the last of which it briefly reoccupied.

At the end of 1862, Spain sent a scientific expedition to South American waters with the covert purpose of reinforcing the financial and legal claims of Spanish citizens residing in the Americas. The expedition was under the command of Admiral Luis Hernández-Pinzón Álvarez, a direct descendant of the Pinzón brothers, who had accompanied Christopher Columbus on his voyage that is generally considered to constitute the discovery of the Americas by Europeans. Pinzón's squadron was composed of four warships: the twin screw frigates Nuestra Señora del Triunfo and Resolución, the screw corvette Vencedora and the screw schooner Virgen de Covadonga.

The Spanish ships arrived at the port of Valparaíso, Chile, on April 18, 1863. Spain had recognized Chilean independence since the 1840s, and the two nations had maintained diplomatic relations. The expedition was cordially received, and the admiral exchanged visits with local authorities. The vessels left Chile in July 1863 amicably and moved on to Peru. Even though Spain had never recognized Peruvian independence, which had been declared in 1821, the squadron received a friendly welcome at the port of Callao. It stayed in port for a few weeks and then sailed bound for San Francisco, California, United States.

== Talambo incident ==
On August 4, 1863, an incident took place at the Talambo hacienda, in Lambayeque, Peru. The details are fragmentary, but the episode involved a fight that broke out between two Spanish residents and 40 local citizens. As a result, one Spaniard died, and four others were injured.

When news of the incident reached Pinzón, he returned with his fleet to Peru on November 13 and demanded for its government to issue an apology and for reparations to be made to the affected Spanish nationals. In response, the Peruvians took the position that the episode was an internal police matter that should be handled by the Peruvian justice system and that no apology was due. At that juncture, the Spanish government in Madrid decided to demand payment of Peruvian debts stemming from the War of Independence as well, and it sent the representative Eusebio Salazar y Mazarredo to settle the issue directly with the Peruvian authorities.

Salazar arrived in March 1864, bearing the title of Royal Commissary. That was a deliberate insult to the government of Peru because a commissary is a colonial functionary, rather than an ambassador, the normal level of diplomatic contact during consultations between independent states. The snub doomed negotiations with the Peruvian Minister of Foreign Affairs, Juan Antonio Ribeyro Estrada.

== Occupation of the Chincha Islands ==
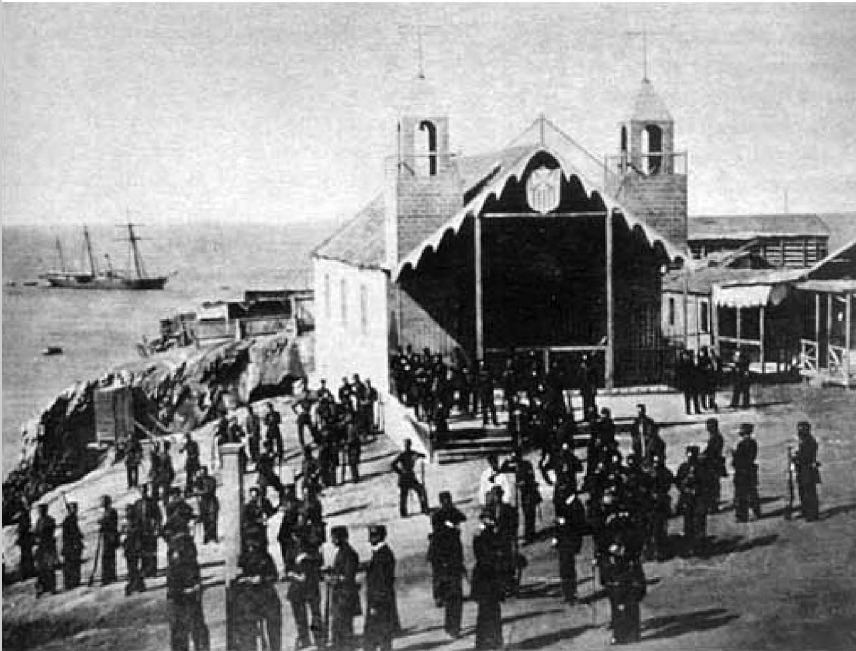
The Chincha Islands of Peru were occupied by Spanish marines on April 14, 1864.

On April 14, 1864, in retaliation for Peru's refusal to pay an indemnity, the Spanish fleet seized the lightly defended Chincha Islands, the main source of Peruvian guano. The Spanish placed the islands' Peruvian governor, Ramón Valle Riestra, under arrest aboard the Resolución, occupied the islands with 400 marines, and raised the Spanish flag. Spain considered the islands an important bargaining chip, as they were a major Peruvian economic asset and produced almost 60% of the government's annual revenue.

The Spanish squadron also blockaded principal Peruvian ports, disrupting commerce and fostering a high level of resentment throughout Latin America. Spain expected little resistance from Peru and believed its military capabilities to be negligible. A proposal to exchange the islands for British-held Gibraltar was even entertained for a time. During the blockade, Triunfo was destroyed by an accidental fire off Pisco on the evening of 25 November 1864.

The new Spanish Prime Minister, Ramón María Narváez, disapproved of the unilateral actions taken by Pinzón and replaced him with Vice Admiral Juan Manuel Pareja, who had been Minister of the Navy. Pareja had been born in Peru, and his father, Brigadier Antonio Pareja, had died in Chile in 1813 while he was fighting for Spain during the Chilean War of Independence. Narváez's conciliatory opinion soon changed, and he dispatched another four warships to reinforce the Pacific fleet.

Pareja arrived in Peru in December 1864 and immediately opened negotiations with General Manuel Ignacio de Vivanco, the special representative of Peruvian President Juan Antonio Pezet. The Vivanco-Pareja Treaty was signed on January 27, 1865 on board the screw frigate Villa de Madrid. Popular opinion in Peru considered the treaty as detrimental to its national honor. When the Peruvian Congress refused to ratify it, a general uprising followed, and Pezet's government fell on November 7.

== War with Chile ==
In the meantime, anti-Spanish sentiments in several South American countries, including Bolivia, Chile, and Ecuador, increased. Peru and its neighbors still remained wary of any moves that might foreshadow an attempt to re-establish the Spanish Empire. Given the climate of suspicion, no one was surprised when the Spanish gunboat Vencedora stopped at a Chilean port for coal, and President José Joaquín Pérez declared that coal was a war supply that could not be sold to a belligerent nation.

From the Spanish point of view, the Chilean coaling embargo was taken as proof that Chile no longer was neutral. That was reinforced after two Peruvian steamers left the port of Valparaíso bearing weapons and Chilean volunteers bound for Peru. Vice Admiral José Manuel Pareja thus took a hard line and demanded sanctions against Chile that were even heavier than those imposed upon Peru. He then detached four wooden ships from his squadron and dispatched them to Chile while the Numancia and the Covadonga remained to guard Callao.

Pareja arrived at Valparaíso on September 17, 1865 aboard his flagship the Villa de Madrid. He demanded that the Spanish flag be given a 21-gun salute. He deliberately presented his demand on the day before Chilean National Day (September 18). Under the circumstances, the Chileans refused, and war was declared a week later on September 24.

The new Spanish prime minister, Leopoldo O'Donnell, who had replaced Narváez, ordered Pareja to withdraw, but the Spanish admiral chose to ignore the direct order. As he had no troops with which to attempt a landing, he decided to impose a blockade of the main Chilean ports. That action was unenforceable since a blockade of Chile's 1,800 miles (2,900 km) of coastline would have required a fleet that was several times larger than what Pareja had at his disposal. The blockade of the port of Valparaíso, however, caused such great economic damage to both Chilean and foreign interests that the navies of the United States and the United Kingdom, despite remaining neutral in the conflict, issued a formal protest.

=== Battle of Papudo ===
Even before Chile and Peru were formally allied, Spain had suffered a humiliating naval defeat at the naval Battle of Papudo on November 26, 1865. The engagement had the Chilean corvette Esmeralda capture the Spanish schooner Covadonga, taking the crew prisoner and seizing the admiral's war correspondence. That humiliation was too much for Pareja, who committed suicide two days later aboard his flagship. The general command of the Spanish fleet in the Pacific was assumed by Commodore Casto Méndez Núñez, who quickly received a promotion to rear admiral.

== War with Peru, Ecuador, and Bolivia ==
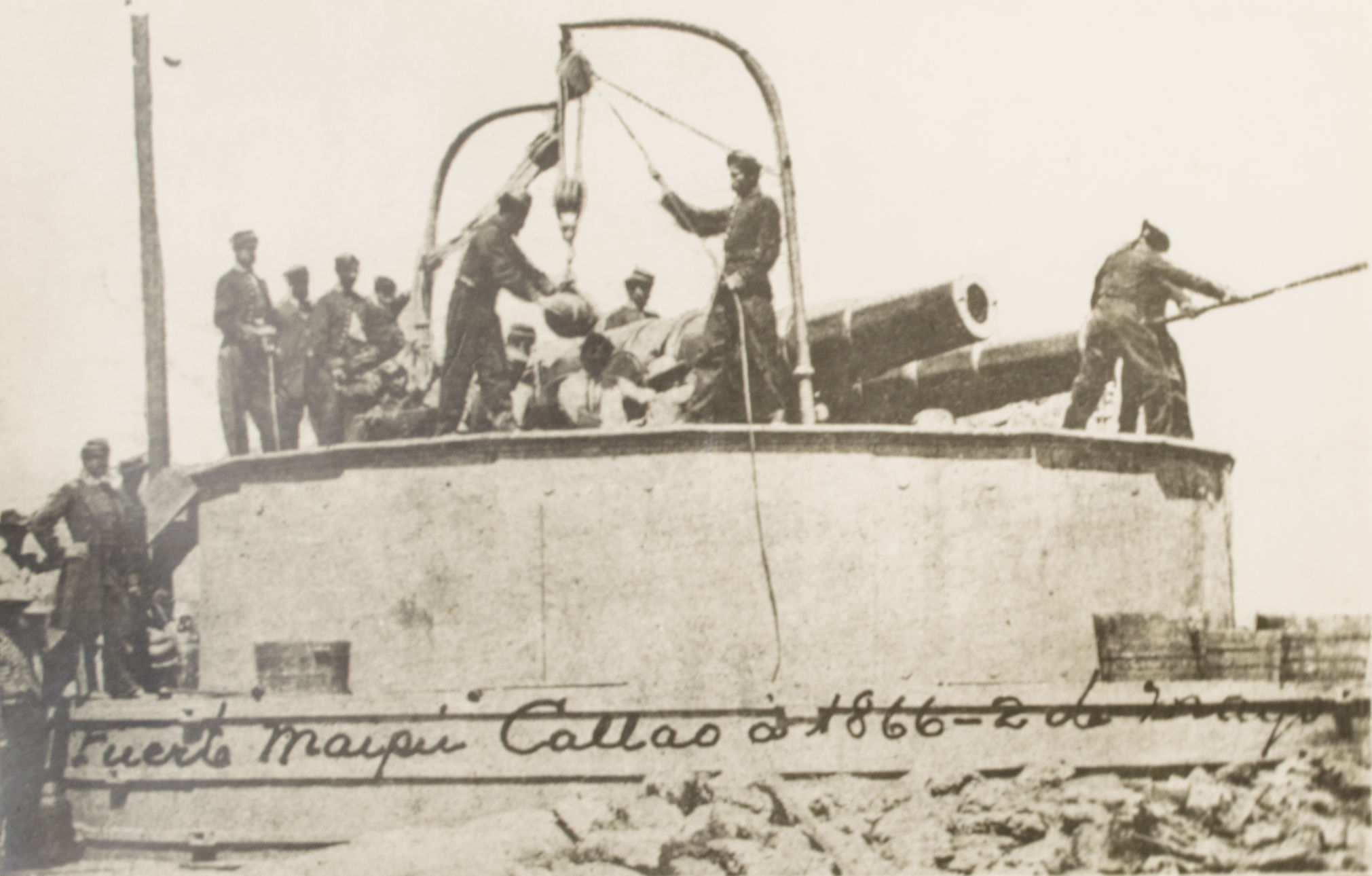
A Peruvian battery during the Battle of Callao

On November 7, 1865, his unwillingness to declare war on Spain and the vilification arising from his signing of the Vivanco-Pareja Treaty forced Peruvian President Juan Antonio Pezet from office. He was replaced by his vice president, General Pedro Diez Canseco.

Diez Canseco also tried to avoid war with Spain, which similarly led to his downfall only 20 days later. On November 26, General Mariano Ignacio Prado, the leader of the nationalist movement, deposed Canseco. The new government immediately declared its solidarity with Chile and its intention to declare war on Spain and to restore Peru's national honor.

Chile and Peru formally signed an alliance against Spain on December 5, 1865. The Peruvian Congress ratified the alliance on January 12, 1866 and two days later, Peru finally declared war on Spain. Chile's navy was weak and almost nonexistent. To reinforce its Chilean ally, a Peruvian squadron, commanded by Captain Lizardo Montero, was immediately dispatched to the south. Among the ships in the squadron were the steam frigates Amazonas and Apurímac.

Ecuador joined the alliance on January 30, 1866 by declaring war on Spain on that day. Bolivia, under the command of General Mariano Melgarejo, also declared war on March 22, 1866. The moves resulted in all ports on South America's Pacific coast south of Colombia becoming closed to the Spanish fleet. Argentina refused to join the alliance, as it was embroiled in a war with Paraguay.

=== Battle of Abtao ===
Spain's Admiral Mendez Núñez sent two of his most powerful ships (the frigates Villa de Madrid and Reina Blanca) south to destroy the combined Chilean-Peruvian fleet. The Allied squadron had been placed under the command of Peruvian Captain Manuel Villar and had taken refuge at Abtao, a well-protected inlet near the gulf of Chiloé, in southern Chile. The Spanish squadron appeared at the entrance of the inlet on February 7, 1866, but the Spanish did not enter to avoid risking their ironclads running aground in the shallows. A cannonade, lasting several hours, was exchanged with little effect. In spite of being at anchor, without steam, and with some ships with their engines undergoing overhaul, the Allies mounted an energetic fight. The Covadonga, under the command of Lieutenant Manuel Thomson, managed to fire over an island and scored several hits on Reina Blanca. The battle ended indecisively without further developments. Reluctant to enter shallow waters and realizing that a long-range gun duel would serve no purpose but to waste ammunition, the Spanish commanders withdrew.

Williams and the Esmeralda were not at the anchorage on the day of the battle. The commodore had sailed to Ancud for coaling. On its way back to Valparaiso, the Spanish squadron captured a Chilean steamship, Paquete del Maule, which was transporting sailors to crew the new Peruvian ironclads Huáscar and Independencia.

=== Bombardment of Valparaíso ===
The Spanish could not attack land forces and had been frustrated in attempts to engage the Allied squadron at sea. The Spanish ships were isolated, short of supplies, and losing hope of victory. When the Chilean government ordered all vessels communicating with the Spanish fleet to be barred from Chilean ports, Admiral Mendez Núñez decided to take punitive actions against the Allied ports. The Spanish fleet shelled and burned the town and the port of Valparaíso on March 31 and destroyed Chile's merchant fleet. A total of 33 vessels were burned or sunk. The damage to the Chilean merchant marine was catastrophic. Twelve years later, the total tonnage under the Chilean flag was still less than half of what it had been in 1865.

=== Battle of Callao ===
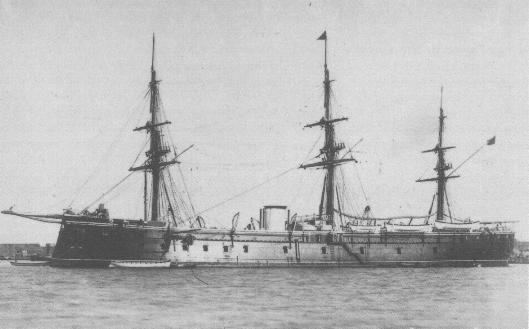
Numancia, flagship of the Spanish fleet

Admiral Mendez Núñez, displeased at having to resort to destroying defenseless targets such as Valparaíso and with the inconclusive result at Abtao, decided to change tactics and to attack a heavily defended port. As a result, he set sail for the Peruvian port city of Callao. The Battle of Callao took place on May 2 after which both sides claimed victory. Peruvian defenders claimed that they had halted the Spanish from regaining their lost authority and prestige in South America, prevented them from enforcing their demands upon Peru, and forced the withdrawal of the Spanish fleet, which was technically correct since Peruvian cannons fired the last shots in the battle. The Spanish claimed to have visited punishment upon its former colony. Spanish guns had managed to cause only limited damage to defenses, and most of the cannons, artillery, and buildings in Callao itself survived the battle intact.

== Aftermath ==
Whether the suspicions of a Spanish scheme to recapture its former colonies had any basis in fact is unknown. Many in South America saw Spain's meddling in Latin America and its occupation of the Chincha Islands as proof of a long-range Spanish plot to reassert its influence over its previous colonial territories. The force sent by Spain, on the other hand, amounted to a mere squadron of ships with negligible capabilities for landing forces, and its intention may have been only to seize the islands for their valuable fertiliser resources as reparations and to regain some of Spain's lost prestige. Regardless of the reason behind the conflict, Spain found it impossible to hold its positions. With all ports south of Colombia closed to it for coaling and provisioning, the Spanish fleet withdrew from patrolling the South American coastline, vacated the Chincha Islands, and returned to Spain via the Philippines, completing a circumnavigation of the globe to do so.

Over the following several years, Spain and the republics agreed to peace treaties that formally ended the war:

- With Peru: 14 April 1879
- With Bolivia: 21 August 1879
- With Chile: 12 June 1883
- With Ecuador: 28 January 1885

Beyond the formal end of hostilities, the Chincha Islands War had lasting regional consequences. In Peru, President Mariano Ignacio Prado portrayed the conflict as a national victory and used it to advance state-building efforts, ordering the purchase of the ironclads Independencia and Huáscar, the first armored ships in Latin America, which shifted the regional balance of naval power. The war also spurred neighboring countries to strengthen their armed forces and redefine internal political alliances. In Chile, President Federico Errázuriz Zañartu (1871–1876), who had served as secretary of war during the conflict, led efforts to modernize the army amid growing regional rivalries and domestic struggles between liberal and conservative factions.

=== Commemoration ===
The calle del Pacífico ("Pacific street", now Avenida de la Ciudad de Barcelona) in Madrid, Spain, was named after this campaign. The street gave name to a neighborhood and metro station.

== Order of battle ==
=== Spain ===
General Commanders

- Vice-Admiral Luis Hernández Pinzón (1863–1864)
- Vice-Admiral José Manuel Pareja (1864–1865)
- Rear-Admiral Casto Méndez Núñez (1865–1866)

Vessel	tons (L.ton)	Speed (Knots)	Armour (Inch)	Main Artillery	Built Year	Notes
Ironclad frigates
Numancia	7,500 tons	12 knots (22 km/h; 14 mph)	5½; Iron belt	34 200 mm guns	1863	At the time among the most powerful ships of the world.
Screw-frigates
Villa de Madrid	4,478 tons	15 knots (28 km/h; 17 mph)	–	30 200 mm guns 14 160 mm guns 2 150 mm howitzers 2 120 mm guns 2 80 mm guns	1862	
Almansa	3,980 tons	12 knots (22 km/h; 14 mph)	–	30 200 mm guns 14 160 mm guns 2 150 mm howitzers 2 120 mm guns 2 80 mm guns	1864	Arrived to the Pacific in April 1866 only days before the Battle of Callao
Reina Blanca	3,800 tons	12 knots (22 km/h; 14 mph)	–	68 guns	1864	
Berenguela	3,800 tons	12 knots (22 km/h; 14 mph)	–	36 guns	1864	
Resolución	3,100 tons	11 knots (20 km/h; 13 mph)	–	1 220 mm guns 20 200 mm guns 14 160 mm guns 2 150 mm howitzers 2 120 mm guns 2 80 mm guns	1861	
Nuestra Señora del Triunfo	3,100 tons	11 knots (20 km/h; 13 mph)	–	1 220 mm guns 20 200 mm guns 14 160 mm guns 2 150 mm howitzers 2 120 mm guns 2 80 mm guns	1861	Lost in accidental fire off Pisco on the evening of 25 November 1864

Steam-schooners

- Vencedora, Built 1861; Weight 778 tons; Speed 8 knots (15 km/h; 9 mph); weapons two 200 mm revolving guns and two 160 mm guns.
- Virgen de Covadonga, Built 1864; Weight 445 tons; Speed 8 knots; Weapons two revolving 200 mm guns at the sides and one revolving 160 mm guns at the prow. Captured by Chile at Battle of Papudo on November 26, 1865.

Steamboats

- Marqués de la Victoria – 3 guns

Sail transports

- Consuelo
- Mataura

=== Peru ===
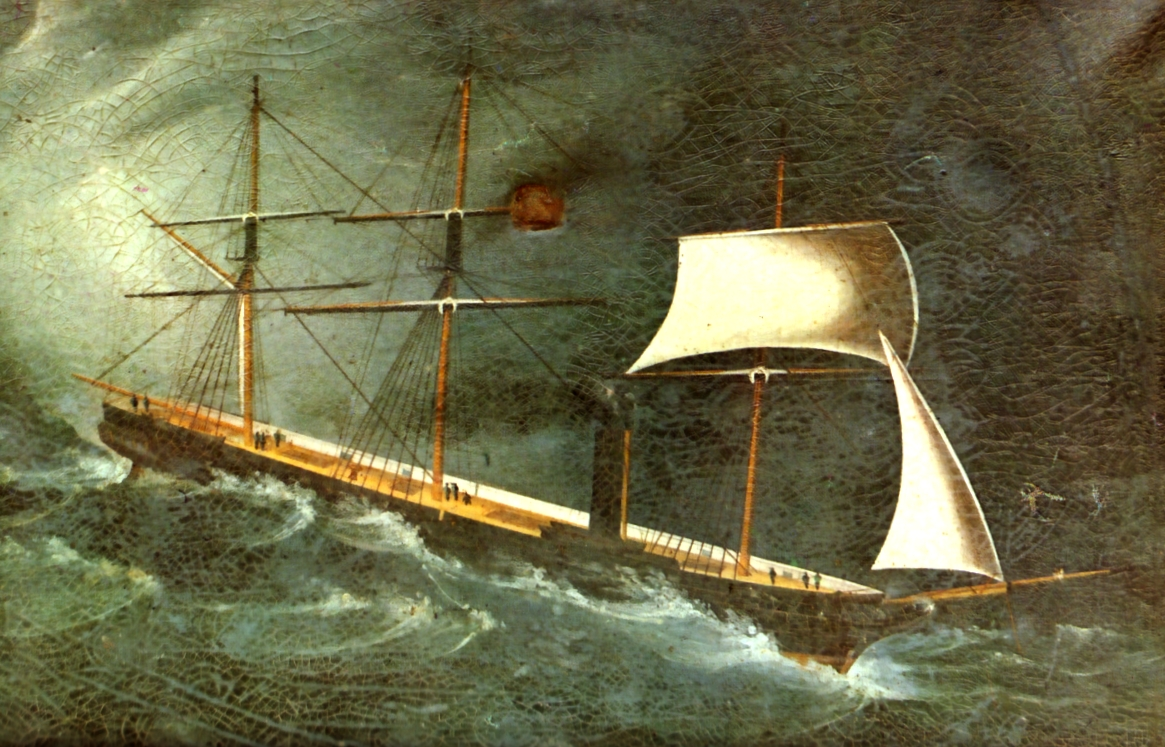
The screw-frigate Amazonas

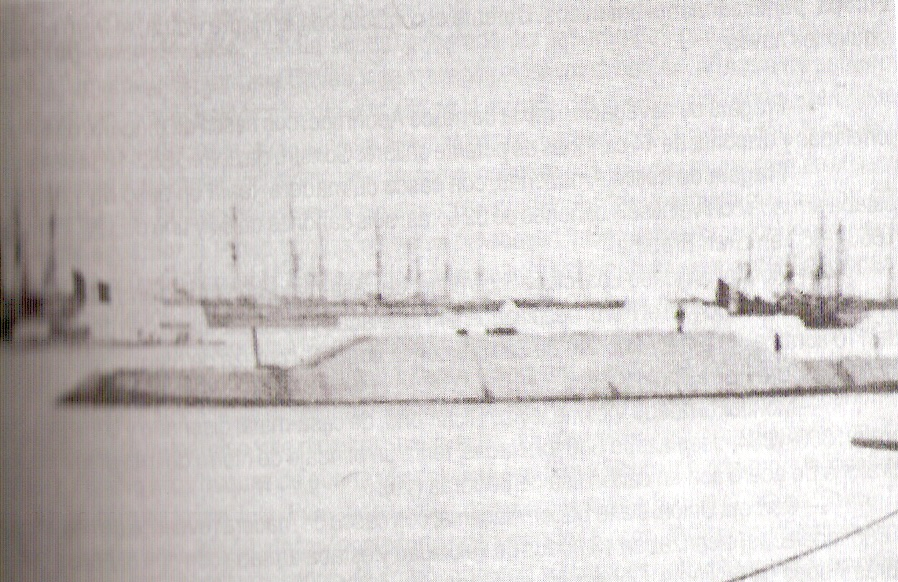
The Loa being fitted after its conversion in the Callao harbour, 1864

General Commanders

- Captain Lizardo Montero
- Captain Manuel Villar

Screw-frigates

- Apurímac – Built 1854; Weight 1,666-tons; Speed 9.43 knots (17 km/h); Weapons thirty-four guns
- Amazonas – Built 1851; Weight 1,743-tons; Speed 9.43 knots (17 km/h); Weapons thirty-three 200 mm guns – Beached at Abtao, near Punta Quilque, 15 January 1886

Steam-schooners

- Tumbes – Built 1854; Weight 250-tons; Speed 7 knots (13 km/h); Weapons two 68-pounder guns

Steamboats

- Chalaco – Built 1864 – 2 guns
- Colón – Built 1864 – 2 guns

Ironclad monitors

- Loa – Built 1854, conversion to ironclad ordered in 1864; Weight 648-tons; Speed 10 knots (19 km/h); Weapons four 32 pdr. guns
- Victoria – Built 1865; 1 gun

=== Chile ===
General Commanders

- Captain Juan Williams Rebolledo

==== Corvette ====
- Esmeralda – Built in 1854, 854-ton weight, speed of 8 knots (14.82 km / h), armed with two guns boat 12 lb, 16 smoothbore muzzle-loading guns of 32 lb and 4 smooth-bore muzzle-loading guns of 32 lb.

Steam-schooners

- Virgen de Covadonga – Built 1864; Weight 445-tons; Speed 8 knots (15 km/h); Weapons two revolving 200 mm guns at the sides and one revolving 160 mm guns at the prow. Captured by Chile at Battle of Papudo on November 26, 1865.

Transports

- Paquete del Maule – Captured by Spain; Speed 13 knots (24 km/h); armament 2 guns.

==== Steamers ====
- Maipú – Built 1855 in England; Acquired 1857; Displacement 450 tons; Speed 8 knots; armed with 1 68 lb gun and 4 32 lb guns
- Lautauro – Built 1852; Given by Peru to Chile for wartime use 1865; Displacement 450 tons

== Sources ==
- Budino, José M. (2008). "Re: The Capture of Tornado". Warship International. XLV (4): 265. ISSN 0043-0374.
- Burr, Robert N. (1967). By Reason or Force: Chile and the Balancing of Power in South America, 1830–1905. Los Angeles and Berkeley: University of California Press.
- Chesneau, Roger; Eugene Kolesnik, eds. (1979). Conway's All the World's Fighting Ships 1860–1905. Conway Maritime Press. ISBN 0831703024.
- Curana, J.; Koehler, R. B.; Silverstone, Paul H. (1990). "Question 12/89". Warship International. XXVII (2): 200–203. ISSN 0043-0374.
- Farcau, Bruce W. (2000). The Ten Cents War: Chile, Peru and Bolivia in the War of the Pacific, 1879–1884. Westport, Connecticut: Praeger Publishers. ISBN 0275969258.
- Greene, Jack (2008). "Re: The Capture of Tornado". Warship International. XLV (4): 265. ISSN 0043-0374.
- Guinot, Dolores Luna (2009). Conspiracy In Mendoza. Victoria, British Columbia: Trafford Publishing. ISBN 978-1426921858.
- Moore, John Bassett (1898). History and Digest of the International Arbitrations to which the United States Has Been a Party. Washington, D.C.: U.S. Government Printing Office.
- NYT staff (10 April 1866). "South America: High-handed Movements in Bolivia – Miscellaneous. CEntrap America: Revolution in Panama – Bogus Canal and Railroad Companies – The Barbacoas Gold Mines – The Mines a Failure – All the Miners Anxious to Return – Over One Hundred already Returned to Panama – Naval Matters". The New York Times.
- NYT staff (6 May 1866). "South America: From the Seat of War – Great Preparations and "Great Expectations" – The Grand Movement of the Allied Fleet Again Delayed – Paraguayan Spies and their Stories – The War Beginning to Affect the Finances of the Argentine Confederation. The Bombardment of Valparaiso: Letter from an Americal Naval Officer". The New York Times.
- Tucker, Spencer C. (1967). A Global Chronology of Conflict: From the Ancient World to the Modern Middle East. Santa Barbara, California: ABC-CLIO. ISBN 978-1-85109672-5.
- "Old Peruvian ships" (in Spanish). p. 4. Archived from the original on October 14, 2007. "Mentions Apurimac both under her original name, and under the name Callao without appreciating that they were the same ship"
