= Spanish frigate Nuestra Señora del Triunfo =

Spanish Navy screw frigate of 1862–1864

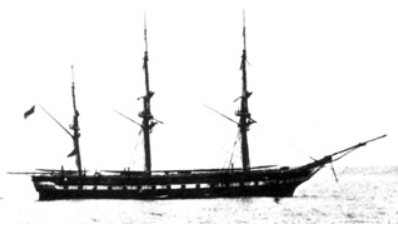

History

Armada Española Ensign
- Name: Nuestra Señora del Triunfo
- Namesake: "Our Lady of Triumph," an alternative name for Mary, mother of Jesus
- Ordered: 14 September 1859 (authorized)
- Builder: Arsenal de La Carraca, San Fernando, Spain
- Cost: 4,367,011.33 pesetas
- Laid down: 19 November 1860
- Launched: 18 October 1861
- Commissioned: April 1862
- Fate: Burned 25 November 1864

General characteristics
- Type: Screw frigate
- Displacement: 3,200 t (3,100 long tons)
- Length: 70 m (229 ft 8 in)
- Beam: 14 m (45 ft 11 in)
- Draft: 6.16 m (20 ft 3 in)
- Depth: 7.33 m (24 ft 1 in)
- Installed power: 500 hp (373 kW) (nominal); 1,900 ihp (1,417 kW) (indicated)
- Propulsion: One John Penn and Sons steam engine, one shaft; 350 tons coal
- Speed: 11 knots (20 km/h; 13 mph)
- Complement: 480 or 500 (see text)
- Armament: 1 x 220 mm (8.7 in) swivel gun (see text); 14, 15, or 20 x 68-pounder (31 kg) 200 mm (7.9 in) smoothbore guns (see text); 14 or 26 x 32-pounder (14.5 kg) 160 mm (6.3 in) rifled guns (see text); 4 x "smaller bronze guns" or 2 x 150 mm (5.9 in) howitzers, 2 x 120 mm (4.7 in) rifled guns, and 2 x 80 mm (3.1 in) rifled guns (for use in boats) (see text)

Nuestra Señora del Triunfo (Our Lady of Triumph, an alternative name for Mary, mother of Jesus), sometimes referred to as Triunfo, was a Spanish Navy Lealtad-class screw frigate commissioned in 1862. She was destroyed by an accidental fire in 1864 during her only overseas deployment.

== Characteristics ==
Nuestra Señora del Triunfo was a Lealtad-class screw frigate with a wooden hull. She had three masts and a bowsprit. She displaced 3,200 tons. She was 70 metres (229 ft 8 in) long, 14 metres (45 ft 11 in) in beam, 7.33 metres (24 ft 1 in) in depth, and 6.16 metres (20 ft 3 in) in draft. She had a John Penn and Sons steam engine rated at a nominal 500 horsepower (373 kW) that generated 1,900 indicated horsepower (1,417 kW), giving her a speed of 11 knots (20 km/h; 13 mph). She could carry up to 350 or 550 tons of coal, according to different sources. Sources disagree on her armament, one claiming it consisted of fourteen or fifteen 68-pounder (31 kg) 200-millimetre (7.9 in) smoothbore guns and twenty-six 32-pounder (14.5 kg) 160-millimetre (6.3 in) guns as well as four smaller bronze guns for disembarkation and use in her boats, while another asserts that she was armed with one 220-millimetre (8.7 in) swivel gun on her bow, twenty 68-pounder (31 kg) 200-millimetre (7.9 in) smoothbore guns, fourteen 32-pounder (14.5 kg) 160-millimetre (6.3 in) guns, and six guns — two 150-millimetre (5.9 in) howitzers, two 120-millimetre (4.7 in) rifled guns, and two short 80-millimetre (3.1 in) rifled guns — for use in her boats. She had a crew of 480 or 500 men, according to different sources.

== Construction and commissioning ==
Nuestra Señora del Triunfo′s construction was authorized on 14 September 1859. Her keel was laid at the Arsenal de La Carraca in San Fernando, Spain, on 19 November 1860. She was launched on 18 October 1861 and commissioned in April 1862. Her construction cost was 4,367,011.33 pesetas.

== Service history ==
Nuestra Señora del Triunfo′s first assignment was to the Training Squadron, which was under the overall command of Contralmirante (Counter Admiral) Luis Hernández-Pinzón Álvarez. The squadron was dissolved in June 1862, and Nuestra Señora del Triunfo and her sister ship Resolución were assigned to the Pacific Squadron. The two screw frigates entered the Arsenal de La Carraca at San Fernando to fit out for their deployment to the southeastern Pacific Ocean.

Nuestra Señora del Triunfo and Resolución departed Cádiz on 10 August 1862. Under the command of Pinzón, who flew his flag aboard Resolución, the two ships had both the political-military task of demonstrating a Spanish presence in the Americas and a scientific research mission and had three zoologists, a geologist, a botanist, an anthropologist, a taxidermist, and a photographer aboard. The two screw frigates stopped at the Canary Islands and Cape Verde and then crossed the Atlantic Ocean to Brazil before arriving at the Río de la Plata (River Plate), where they rendezvoused with the screw corvette Vencedora.

The screw schooner Virgen de Covadonga soon joined the expedition at the Río de la Plata as well. The four ships got underway from Montevideo on 10 January 1863 and proceeded down the coast of Patagonia, passed the Falkland Islands, rounded Cape Horn on 6 February 1863, and entered the Pacific Ocean. They then stopped at the Chiloé Archipelago off the coast of Chile before continuing their voyage up the coasts of South America and North America, stopping at several ports before calling at San Francisco, California, in the United States from 9 October to 1 November 1863. They then headed southward and arrived at Valparaíso, Chile, on 13 January 1864.

At the time, Spain still had not yet recognized the independence of Chile and Peru from the Spanish Empire, and the presence of the Spanish warships on the Pacific coast of South America — especially in the aftermath of Spain's annexation of the First Dominican Republic in 1861 and Spanish involvement in a multinational intervention in Mexico in 1861–1862 — raised suspicions in South America as to the intentions of the Spanish government. In retaliation for various hostile actions against Spanish citizens and property in Peru, Pinzón's squadron seized the Chincha Islands from Peru on 14 April 1864 without authorization from the Spanish government, taking several Peruvians prisoner. With tensions spiking between Spain and Peru, Nuestra Señora del Triunfo and Resolución covered an operation in which many of the Spaniards in Peru embarked on the steamer Heredia at Callao and Virgen de Covadonga towed Heredia out of the harbor under the guns of Peruvian Navy warships that were ready to open fire. Spain and Peru avoided war, but Pinzón resigned his command on 9 November 1864 because he felt that the Spanish government had not supported his actions, and Contralmirante (Counter Admiral) José Manuel Pareja took charge of the Pacific Squadron.

The Pacific Squadron was in the Chincha Islands off Pisco, Peru, on 25 November 1864 when the transport Tampico arrived from Valparaíso with supplies for the squadron, including several cans of turpentine for use in preparing paint aboard Nuestra Señora del Triunfo. While her commanding officer was aboard Resolución for a meal with Pareja, Nuestra Señora del Triunfo′s crew began storing the supplies Tampico had delivered. At 16:30, a sailor spilled a can of turpentine in the paint storeroom, then accidentally hit his head on a lantern while trying to avoid the turpentine. The lantern set fire to the turpentine. The senior officer aboard began a firefighting effort, and Nuestra Señora del Triunfo′s commanding officer quickly returned from Resolución to take charge. Nuestra Señora del Triunfo′s gunpowder magazine was flooded to prevent a catastrophic explosion, but by nightfall the fire had spread out of control. Her crew abandoned ship, and the fire destroyed Nuestra Señora del Triunfo.
