= Chilean corvette Esmeralda =

Ship launched in 1855

Coordinates: 20°10′16″S 70°09′00″W

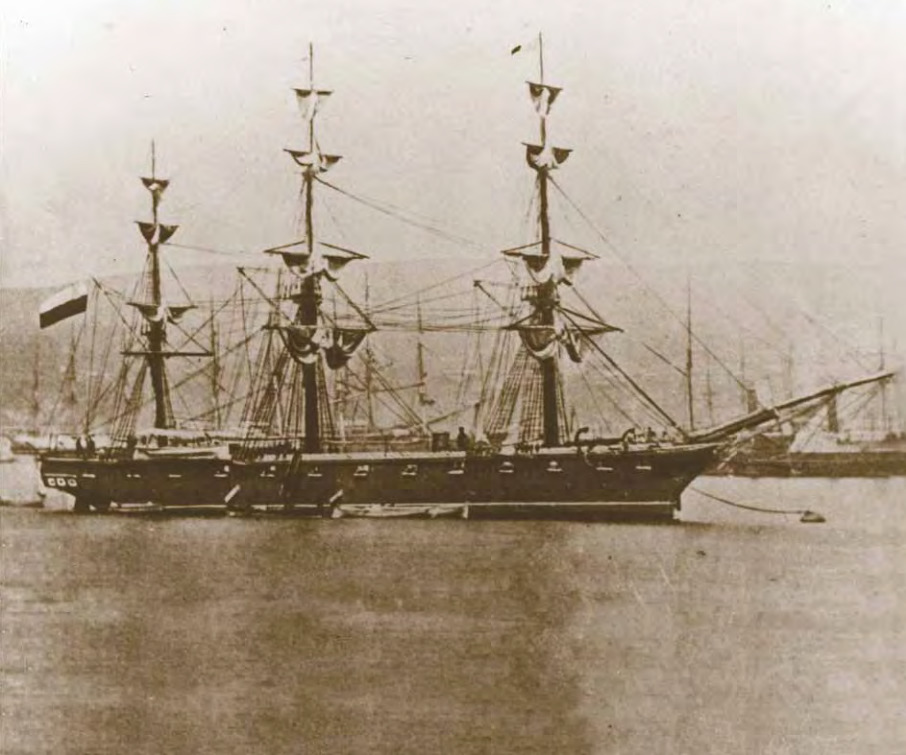
- Corbeta Esmeralda

History

Chile
- Name: Esmeralda
- Namesake: Esmeralda (1791)
- Ordered: 30 June 1852
- Awarded: 23 October 1854
- Builder: William Pitcher, Northfleet, England
- Cost: £23,000
- Laid down: December 1854
- Launched: 26 June 1855
- Commissioned: 18 September 1855
- Fate: Sunk, 21 May 1879

General characteristics
- Type: Steam corvette
- Tons burthen: 854 77/94 tons bm
- Length: 210 ft (64 m) o/a (excluding bowsprit); 180 ft (55 m) (p/p); 166 ft (51 m) (keel)
- Beam: 32 ft (9.8 m)
- Depth of hold: 18 ft (5.5 m)
- Propulsion: 4 × coal-fired boilers; 2 × horizontal condensing steam engines; 200 ihp (149 kW) at 31 rpm; Single screw
- Sail plan: Full-rigged ship
- Speed: 8 knots (15 km/h; 9.2 mph) (under steam)
- Complement: 200
- Armament: As built; 20 × 32-pounder long guns; 2 × 12-pounder guns; From 1868; 12 × Armstrong 40-pounder rifled guns; 4 × Whitworth 40-pounder smoothbore guns

Service record
- Commanders: Robert Winthrop Simpson; Juan Williams Rebolledo; Arturo Prat Chacón
- Operations: Chincha Islands War; War of the Pacific

Esmeralda was a wooden-hulled steam corvette of the Chilean Navy, launched in 1855, and sunk by the Peruvian turret ship Huáscar on 21 May 1879 at the Battle of Iquique during the War of the Pacific.

== Ship history ==
=== Construction ===
Construction of the ship was authorized on 30 June 1852 by President Manuel Montt and the Minister of War and Navy José Francisco Gana. Chilean naval officer Roberto Simpson Winthrop and shipbuilder William Pitcher of Northfleet, England, signed a contract for her construction, at a total cost of £23,000, on 23 October 1854.

The ship was laid down in December 1854, and launched on 26 June 1855 under the name Esmeralda, after the frigate captured by Thomas Cochrane during the Chilean War of Independence.

Her hull was of wood, and coppered. She was 210 ft (64 m) in length overall (excluding the bowsprit), with a beam of 32 ft (9.8 m) and a depth of 18 ft (5.5 m). Four coal-fired boilers powered two horizontal condensing steam engines rated at 200 indicated horsepower (150 kW), which gave the ship a speed of up to 8 knots (15 km/h; 9.2 mph) under power. The single propeller could be decoupled and raised when under sail. The ship's complement was 200.

=== Service history ===
Esmeralda was commissioned into the Chilean Navy on 18 September 1855, and eventually sailed from Falmouth, Cornwall, under Simpson's command and arrived at Valparaíso on 7 November 1856.

On 26 November 1865, during the Chincha Islands War, while under the command of Juan Williams Rebolledo, she captured the Virgen de Covadonga at the Battle of Papudo.

Her original armament of twenty 32-pounder guns was replaced in 1867–68 with twelve Armstrong rifled 40-pounders and four Whitworth smoothbore 40-pounders.

On 24 May 1875, Esmeralda was driven ashore and severely damaged in a gale at Valparaíso. In 1877 she sailed to Easter Island and Tahiti on a training voyage.

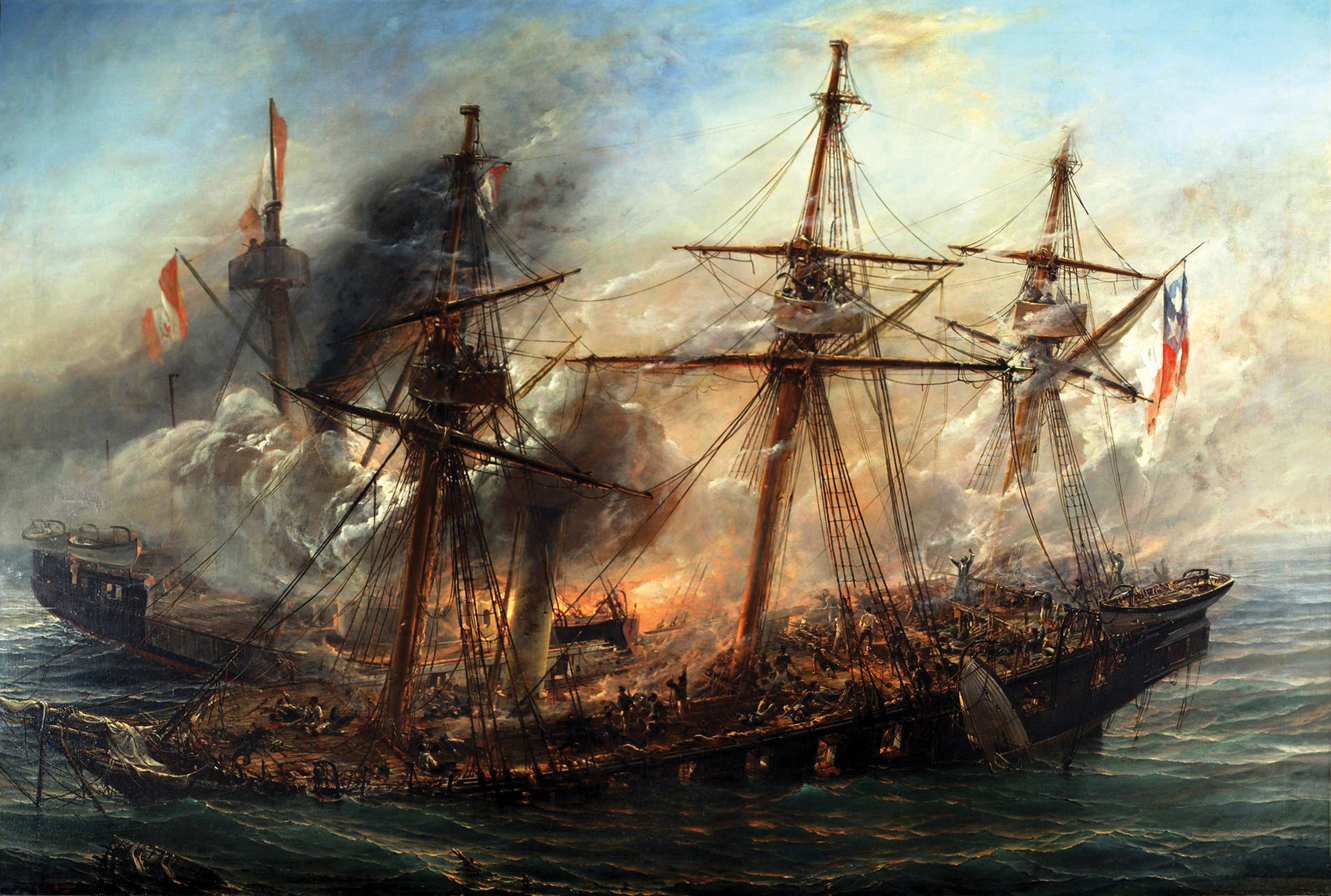
Painting by Thomas Somerscales of the sinking of Esmeralda by Huáscar during the Battle of Iquique

On 21 May 1879, during the War of the Pacific, Esmeralda engaged the Huáscar in the Battle of Iquique. Despite the material superiority of the Peruvian ship, the battle lasted for over three hours. The captain of Esmeralda, Arturo Prat, was killed while leading an attempt to board the enemy vessel, and Huáscar eventually sank Esmeralda after repeated ramming.

== Museum Corbeta Esmeralda ==
In Iquique, a replica of Esmeralda as she was on 20 May 1879 was opened as a museum ship on 20 May 2011 by President Sebastián Piñera, including the descendants of Arturo Prat.

The museum corresponds on the representation of 1:1 scale of the major departments in Esmeralda.

== Bibliography ==
- Adamson, Robert E. & de St. Hubert, Christian (1991). "Question 12/89". Warship International. XXVIII (2): 199–205. ISSN 0043-0374.
