= Vivanco–Pareja Treaty =

1865 treaty between Peru and Spain

Preliminary Treaty of Peace and Friendship between Peru and Spain
- Type: Peace treaty
- Signed: 27 January 1865
- Location: Off the coast of Callao, Peru
- Sealed: 27 January 1865
- Effective: 27 January 1865
- Signatories: Peru; Spain
- Languages: Spanish

Full text
- es:Tratado Vivanco-Pareja at Wikisource

The Vivanco–Pareja Treaty (Spanish: Tratado Vivanco-Pareja), formally the Preliminary Treaty of Peace and Friendship between Peru and Spain (Spanish: Tratado preliminar de Paz y Amistad entre Perú y España), was a treaty between Peru and Spain, signifying cooperation between the two nations during the Chincha Islands War. It was signed on January 27, 1865, on board the frigate Villa de Madrid by Manuel Ignacio de Vivanco (on behalf of Peruvian President Juan Antonio Pezet) and José Manuel Pareja (on behalf of Spanish Prime Minister Ramón María Narváez).

As a consequence, on November 7, 1865, because of his unwillingness to declare war against Spain and his discredit for having signed the treaty, Peruvian President Juan Antonio Pezet was forced out of office in the Peruvian Civil War of 1865 and replaced by his vice president, General Pedro Diez Canseco.

== History ==
The Peruvian foreign minister reported in a session on January 25 that Pareja had delivered two draft treaties to Vivanco, and that he would sign any of them.

The first, Peru had to accredit a Minister before the Spanish Court, once the disagreements were resolved. Said Minister would be authorised to negotiate and conclude a Treaty of Peace, Friendship and Commerce, the bases would be established for "the liquidation, recognition and payment of the amounts that due to kidnappings, confiscation, loans from the War of Independence or any other reason owed by Peru to the subjects of Spain." In addition, the Spanish Government would send a Commissioner to Peru to "initiate procedures or claims regarding the cause followed by the Talambo Incident." In the event that said commissioner did not arrive in Lima within a period of four months, the Chincha Islands would be immediately vacated. Once the disagreements between Peru and Spain had been resolved and the Chincha islands had been returned to our country, the Spanish squadron would head to Callao and salute the national flag with 21 cannon shots.

The second project was based on the fact that the Spanish Government would officially censure the occupation of the Chincha Islands and its Peruvian counterpart would condemn the actions against Eusebio Salazar y Mazarredo, when he was heading to Europe. Once these reciprocal satisfactions were met, the Spanish Government would proceed to deliver the islands to the Peruvian Plenipotentiary. It would also send a Commissioner to carry out the procedures and claims related to the Talambo incident.

For its part, the Government of Peru would authorise its Plenipotentiary in Spain to negotiate and conclude a Treaty of Peace, Friendship, Navigation and Commerce. There the bases would be established for the liquidation, recognition and payment of amounts for kidnappings, confiscations and loans from the War of Independence, and for any other reason, by Peru to duly recognised Spanish subjects. The seventh clause of the project indicated that Peru would compensate Spain with 3 million Spanish pesos. This would cover the expenses incurred by the Spanish Government, as a result of Peru having initially refused to deal with Luis Hernández-Pinzón Álvarez.

At the end of January 1865, (before the 25th) Vivanco delivered an ultimatum to the government of Peru:

General Command of the Pacific Squadron.

The undersigned, Commander-General of the Spanish Fleet in the waters of the Pacific and Plenipotentiary of His Catholic Majesty, has the honour of addressing His Excellency. Mr. Minister of Foreign Affairs of the Republic of Peru, to inform you that the conferences held between the Plenipotentiary of the Republic, the Hon. Mr. General Mr. Manuel Ignacio de Vivanco, and the undersigned, to establish the preliminary bases for a fair and equitable settlement between Peru and Spain, and it being necessary to put an end to the current conflict; The time has come for the Government of the Republic to categorically state whether it is willing to accept the settlement project established in the circulars of the Hon. Mr. Minister of State of His Catholic Majesty, addressed to the Spanish Diplomatic Corps abroad on June 25 and November 8, and transmitted to Mr. Mariano Moreyra Consul of Peru in Madrid, authorised by his Government for this case on that date, and subsequently in a confidential manner, by the undersigned, to the Hon. Mr. General Vivanco on December 30, as I had the honour of telling Your Excellency in my communication of the same date. The undersigned, therefore, hopes that within the precise period of forty-eight hours, Your Excellency will respond to this communication.

The undersigned takes this opportunity to reiterate to Your Excellency the assurances of your highest and distinguished consideration.

The treaty contained almost all the demands of the former colonial power:

- Spain agreed to return the occupied islands (article I)
- Peru appointed a minister in Madrid, which did not imply its recognition as an independent country (article II)
- Peru accepted the arrival of a special commissioner to investigate the incident at Talambo (article III)
- It was agreed to sign a Treaty of Peace, Friendship, Commerce and Navigation in accordance with the terms of the Spanish government (article IV)
- Peru recognized alleged debts owed to Spanish subjects due to the war of independence (article V)
- Peru had to pay 3 million gold pesos as compensation for the expenses caused by the conflict. (article VI)

== Consequences ==
The Peruvian congress went into recess and refused to ratify the treaty. President Pezet then ratified the treaty on February 2, 1865 by decree. The next day Peru regained control of the Chincha Islands. On March 4 it paid the compensation. Domingo Valle Riestra was sent to Madrid to negotiate the peace treaty and in July Ignacio Albistur arrived in Peru as commissioner for the Talambo affair. He was also named Madrid's representative in Lima.

However, the Spanish fleet continued off the Peruvian coast, and in February there were disorders again during the stay of sailors in the port. Esteban Fradera, one of Pareja's companions, was involved in a fight with residents of Callao, which cost him his life. Other Spaniards were injured and the properties of some peninsular immigrants were destroyed. These new issues were resolved with compensation of S/. 117,000, as well as an additional 6,000 for Fradera's widow.

In Arequipa, Mariano Ignacio Prado rebelled against President Pezet, beginning the Peruvian Civil War of 1865, which ended with Pezet's abdication in October. Another conflict with Spain began, which ended with the Battle of Callao, on May 2, 1866.

== See also ==
- José Nicolás Hurtado de Mendoza y Jaraquemada, who proposed a solution earlier in the conflict
