= Topmast =

Upper section of mast on sailing ship

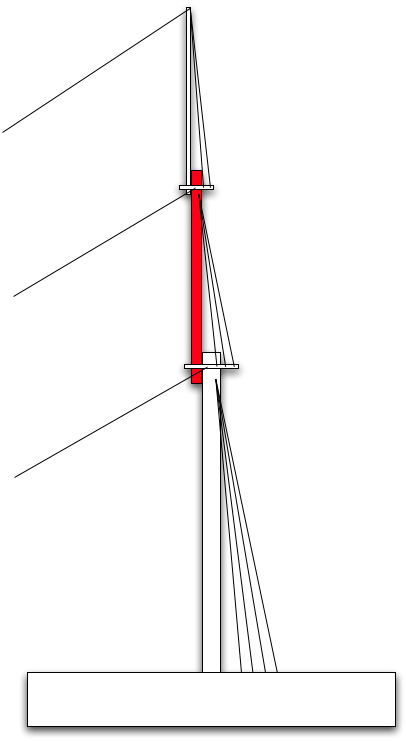
A traditional ship's mast, consisting of "lower" (i.e. Main-, Fore- or Mizzen-) mast, topmast and topgallant/royal mast. The topmast is highlighted in red.

The masts of traditional sailing ships were not single spars, but were constructed of separate sections or masts, each with its own rigging. The topmast is one of these.

The topmast is semi-permanently attached to the upper front of the lower mast, at the top. Its shrouds run to the edges of the top, rather than to the sides of the hull, though long shrouds leading well aft to the hull, more in the manner of backstays, are sometimes seen. In accordance with the standard square rig sail plan, the topmast carries the topsail. In the late 19th century, however, topsails became so big that merchant ships began to divide them into two separate sails for easier handling; since these were still on the topmast they were known as upper and lower topsails to preserve the consistency of the naming scheme. The majority of large square-riggers today carry separate upper and lower topsails.

The main topmast carries the upper end of the main-topmast-staysail; a mizzen-topmast may carry the equivalent. The fore-topmast will carry a staysail, but depending on where the lower end of the stay is attached it may be called a fore-topmast-staysail or an inner jib.

When steel masts were introduced, with their lengths no longer limited by the height of a tree, ships were often constructed with single spars serving as both lower mast and topmast. In every other respect, however, the "topmast" lived on, with separate shrouds to the lower mast and a top between the two. The section of mast immediately above the top was often painted white as the lower masthead used to be, with the section of the steel mast representing the topmast continuing on above in its usual colour. Topgallant masts and royal masts were similarly combined, though, being shorter, they were often one spar even in the days of wood. A common arrangement on tall ships now in use is a steel spar as lower and topmast, surmounted by a wooden mast as topgallant and royal.
