= Ensenada de Guapilacuy =

Coordinates: 41.839503°S 73.868677°W

Ensenada de Guapilacuy (Blight of Guapilacuy) is a broad bay on the eastern shore of Lacuy Peninsula in northern Chiloé Island. It was formerly known as Puerto Inglés (English Port) after the English pirate George Shelvocke, who stayed in the bay in 1719. Before that, Hendrik Brouwer, the leader of the Dutch expedition to Valdivia, died in the bay on August 7, 1643, before reaching Valdivia.
