= Battle of Papudo =

1865 naval battle of the Chincha Islands War

- Part of the Chincha Islands War
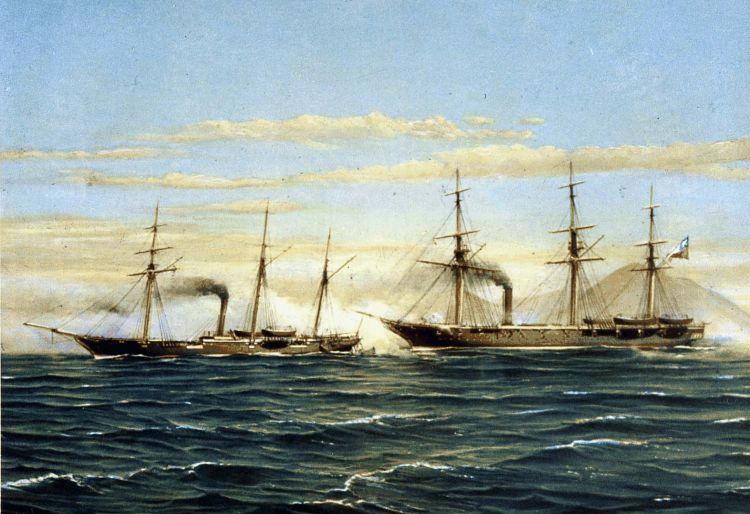
- The Naval Battle of Papudo.
| Date | November 26, 1865 |
| Location | Pacific Ocean, near Valparaíso, Chile 32°29′56.34″S 71°26′47.53″W |
| Result | Chilean victory |

Belligerents
| Spain | Chile |

Commanders and leaders
| (Spain) Luis Fery (POW) | (Chile) Juan Rebolledo |

Strength
| 1 schooner 3 guns | 1 corvette 18 guns |

Casualties and losses
| 4 dead 22 wounded 122 captured 1 schooner captured | None |

The Naval Battle of Papudo was a naval engagement fought between Spanish and Chilean forces on November 26, 1865, during the Chincha Islands War. It was fought 55 miles (48 nmi; 89 km) north of Valparaíso, Chile, near the coastal town of Papudo.

== Background ==
Until November 1865, Chile had been the only country firm in its declaration of war against Spain, which desired to recapture its lost South American colonies. Through the efforts of its president, Mariano Ignacio Prado, Peru was subsequently galvanized into action against Spain.

== Events of the Battle ==
Familiar with Spanish naval movements, the Chilean corvette Esmeralda, under the command of Juan Williams Rebolledo, and whose crew included Arturo Prat, Juan José Latorre and Carlos Condell, waited for any Spanish ships to appear between Coquimbo and Valparaíso.

The Chileans hoisted a British flag on their ship and maneuvered themselves close to the Spanish ship Virgen de Covadonga, under the command of Luis Fery (or Ferry), who thought that the ship may have been one of the similarly built British vessels Shearwater, Colombina, or Mutine. The Esmeralda opened fire on the Covadonga, which returned fire, but the Chilean gunners proved more skillful. The Covadonga received severe hits that incapacitated its crew, causing the Spaniards to attempt a retreat. The Esmeralda followed her, maintaining fire. Fery called out his surrender to Williams Rebolledo, who ordered Manuel Thomson to take possession of the Spanish ship. Chilean engineers then worked to save the captured vessel, the success of which is considered to be a high point in the Chincha Islands War for the Chileans. The events of the battle lasted only half an hour.

== Aftermath ==
In addition to Commander Fery, six Spanish officers, and 115 sailors were taken as prisoners. The Chileans also captured the correspondence of Spanish Admiral Juan Manuel Pareja. This action, together with the general failure of Spanish operations during the Chincha Islands War, led to Pareja committing suicide on board his flagship, the screw frigate Villa de Madrid, on 28 November 1865.

Covadonga, now a vessel in the Chilean Navy, later saw combat in the Battle of Iquique during the War of the Pacific.
