= José Manuel Pareja =

Spanish Navy officer

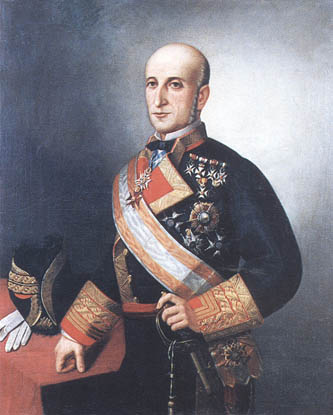
Vice Admiral José Manuel Pareja (1863-1865)

José Manuel de Pareja y Septien (8 February 1813 – 28 November 1865) was a Spanish Navy officer who commanded the Spanish forces during the Chincha Islands War.

== Biography ==
=== Youth and early career ===
Pareja was born in Lima in 1813, the son of Brigadier José Antonio Pareja (1757–1813) and Josepha Septien. After the independence of Peru (1821), his family returned to Spain and he joined the Spanish navy. He made the corresponding ships of his class and traveled almost the entire planet, arriving in one of them to the Philippines. In 1831 he made the instructional cruise aboard the frigate Perla, which was at that time the midshipman school ship.

=== The Chincha Islands War ===
Pareja was sent to the Pacific in 1864 to relieve Admiral Luis Hernández-Pinzón Álvarez, whose seizure of the Chincha Islands was disapproved in Madrid.

On January 27, 1865, he signed the Vivanco-Pareja Treaty which was considered derogatory to Peruvian national honor. A general uprising followed in Peru and the government of General Juan Antonio Pezet fell on July 7, 1865.

After Chile, in support of Peru, had refused to sell supplies to the Spanish fleet, Pareja went with his fleet to Valparaíso on September 17, 1865 and demanded a public apology. As his demands for satisfaction were refused, he declared war against Chile on the 24th, and proceeded to blockade the principal Chilean ports.

During the last weeks of his life, he suffered a series of setbacks in his handling of the War. On November 17 an armed launch of the frigate Resolution was captured by the Allied steamer Independencia near the port of Talcahuano. He could make no positive advances in his war with Chile, his blockade deteriorated, became ineffective and the crews of the ships became demoralized. The proud admiral was unaware that on November 26 the Chileans had captured the Spanish schooner Virgen de Covadonga, along with the admiral's correspondence, at the Naval Battle of Papudo and that during the fight the Spaniards had four men dead and 21 wounded.
When on November 27 the American Consul casually mentioned it, the Admiral suffered a nervous collapse. It was too much for him. The Covadonga was the second warship lost by Spain (after the loss of the Triunfo) in enemy waters. The next day, November 28, Admiral Pareja dressed in his best uniform, laid down on his bed, and shot himself in the head on board his flagship, the screw frigate Villa de Madrid, off Valparaíso. In his testament, he requested not to be buried in Chilean waters; accordingly, he was buried on the high seas.

== See also ==
- Casto Méndez Núñez
