= Princesa =

Princesa may refer to:

- Spanish ship Princesa, various Spanish Navy ships
- Princesa Oliveros (born 1975), Colombian track and field hurdler
- Princesa, Santa Catarina, a municipality of Brazil
- Fernanda Farias de Albuquerque, a Brazilian trans woman, or her autobiography Princesa
  - Princesa (film), a 2001 film directed by Henrique Goldman about de Albuquerque
- Princess/Princesa, an EP by MC Magic
- "Princesa" (song), a 2005 song by Frank Reyes
- "Prinçesa", a 1996 song from the album Anime salve by Fabrizio De André
- "Princesa", a 1998 song from the album No Me Compares by Franke Negrón
- "Princesa", a 2003 song from the album Belinda by Belinda Peregrín
- "Princesa", a 2007 song by Eiza González from the soundrtrack of Lola: Once Upon a Time
- "Princesa", a 2018 song by Tini and Karol G from Quiero Volver

== See also ==
- Puerto Princesa City, capital of Palawan, a first-class city in the Philippines
- Princesas, a 2005 film
- Princess (disambiguation)
