= Princesa (book) =

Book by Fernanda Farias de Albuquerque

- Author: Fernanda Farias de Albuquerque
- Genre: Autobiography
- Publication date: 1994

Princesa (1994) is the autobiography of Fernanda Farias de Albuquerque, a Brazilian trans woman (travesti) detained in Rome's Rebibbia prison. It was written with the help of the Italian director and journalist Maurizio Jannelli, a promoter of literary projects among the prisoners. Jannelli was a former member of the Red Brigades militant group who was also detained in the same prison.

== Initial publication ==
De Albuquerque wrote Princesa, with Jannelli translating de Albuquerque's Sardinian-street Italian text into standard Italian. The book discusses the violence which was inflicted on transvestite and transgender streetwalkers, both from the police and vigilantes (the latter including murders of her colleagues). She also discusses her drug and alcohol addiction while in São Paulo. In 1994, the book was published by Sensibili alle foglie, a publishing co-operative of Renato Curcio, a former member of the Red Brigades. The presentation of her books at the Turin GLBT Film Festival and the presence of Curcio at the festival was opposed by the relatives of those killed by the Red Brigades – one of whom shouted "assassino!" (murderer/assassin) to Curcio's face – which led to de Albuquerque not attending the festival.

== Later publications and legacy ==
The book was re-published by Club degli Editori and Marco Tropea Editore and subsequently translated into Portuguese, Spanish, German and Greek. The novel also inspired the song of the same name by Fabrizio De André (Princesa) in his final album Anime salve (1996) written with Ivano Fossati.

The novel inspired the 2001 film Princesa.
