= Fernanda Farias de Albuquerque =

Brazilian trans woman and author

Fernanda Farias de Albuquerque (1963 – 13 May 2000), was a Brazilian trans woman (travesti) and author. She is best known for her autobiography Princesa (Princess), which is a name she sometimes used as a pseudonym.

== Biography ==
Fernanda Farias de Albuquerque was born in the Brazilian countryside in the Alagoa Grande municipality of Paraíba, in 1963. She grew up without her father in a family in poverty. She was sexually abused as a child and, shortly thereafter, ran away from her maternal home. After receiving little formal education, she briefly worked as a kitchen assistant in São Paulo or Rio de Janeiro before entering into the sex trade in these cities under the pseudonym Princesa (Princess). In 1988, she moved to Europe, hoping for a better life than she had in Brazil. She continued her sex work the streets of Milan before heading over to Rome; it was at this time she experienced heroin addiction. In 1990, she was arrested for the attempted murder of another sex worker. She was arrested and interned in Rebibbia prison, where she learned that she is HIV positive. In prison, she met Giovanni Tamponi, a Sardinian shepherd sentenced to life imprisonment. The two exchanged notebooks, written in a mixture of Portuguese, Sardinian and Italian.

At Tamponi's suggestion, she began to write her story with the director and journalist Maurizio Jannelli, who was also detained in the same prison, and promoter of some literary projects among the prisoners. In this way, she wrote her autobiographical novel Princesa, with Jannelli translating de Albuquerque's Sardinian-street Italian text into standard Italian. The book discusses the violence which was inflicted on transvestite and transgender streetwalkers, both from the police and vigilantes (the latter including murders of her colleagues). She also discusses her drug and alcohol addiction.

In 1994, the book was published by Sensibili alle foglie, a publishing co-operative of Renato Curcio, a former member of the Red Brigades militant group. The presentation of her books at the Turin GLBT Film Festival and the presence of Curcio at the festival was opposed by the relatives of those killed by the Red Brigades – one of whom shouted "assassino!" (murderer/assassin) to Curcio's face – which led to de Albuquerque not attending the festival. The book was re-published by Club degli Editori and Marco Tropea Editore and subsequently translated into Portuguese, Spanish, German and Greek. The novel also inspired the song of the same name by Fabrizio De André (Prinçesa) in his final album Anime salve (1996) written with Ivano Fossati.

For a short time, de Albuquerque was hired as a secretary in Sensibili alle foglie, but left her job "to go back to the sidewalk because that is my fun, my freedom, my victory". She also spent a very short period as a guest of the Comunità di San Benedetto al Porto at the Port of Genoa, directed by the streetwise priest Don Andrea Gallo.

In 1997, she was the subject of the documentary film Le Strade di Princesa – ritratto di una trans molto speciale ("The Streets of Princesa – a portrait of a very special trans woman") by Stefano Consiglio. The documentary was selected at the Venice Film Festival and subsequently broadcast on Rai 2 and Telepiù.

After being expelled and repatriated to Brazil, she died by suicide in May 2000.

In 2001, the film Princesa was released at the cinema, directed by Henrique Goldman and based on the autobiographical book by de Albuquerque. She is played by Ingrid de Souza, an amateur trans actress. Unlike in real life, in the film de Albuquerque is able to overcome her hardships and does not die by suicide. The film did not achieve initial success, but won an award for the best foreign film in the Outfest festival in Los Angeles.

== Publications ==
- Fernanda Farias de Albuquerque and Maurizio Jannelli, Princesa - Fernanda Farias de Albuquerque, Editrice Sensibili alle Foglie, 1994. ISBN 88-86323-31-X
  - Fernanda Farias de Albuquerque and Maurizio Jannelli, Princesa, Ekdoseis Delphini, Athens, 1994, ISBN 960-309-160-X
  - Fernanda Farias de Albuquerque and Maurizio Jannelli, A Princesa - Depoimentos de um travesti brasileiro a um líder das Brigadas Vermelhas, Editora Nova Fronteira, Rio de Janeiro, 1995. ISBN 85-209-0650-8
  - Fernanda Farias de Albuquerque and Maurizio Jannelli, Princesa - Ein Stricherleben, Rotbuch Verlag, Hamburg, 1996. ISBN 3-88022-372-6
  - Fernanda Farias de Albuquerque and Maurizio Jannelli, Princesa - Fernanda Farias de Albuquerque, Editorial Anagrama, Barcelona, 1996. ISBN 978-84-339-2359-2
  - Fernanda Farias de Albuquerque and Maurizio Jannelli, Princesa, Héliotropismes, Marseille, 2021, ISBN 979-10-97210-09-0

== Filmography ==
- Carlo Conversi, Princesa : incontri irregolari, RAI Storie vere, 1994
- Stefano Consiglio, Le Strade di Princesa – ritratto di una trans molto speciale, Lantia Cinema & Audiovisivi and Rai 2, 1997
- Henrique Goldman, Princesa, Bac Films, 2001
