= Spanish ship Principe de Asturias =

A number of ships of the Spanish Navy (Armada Española) have been named Principe de Asturias, including -

- Principe de Asturias, the former HMS Cumberland (1695), a ship of the line acquired in 1717 and recaptured by the British in 1718.
- Principe de Asturias, a ship of the line launched in 1794 and lost in 1814.
- Príncipe de Asturias, a light aircraft carrier in commission from 1988 to 2013 and sold for scrapping in 2017.

== See also ==
- Príncipe de Asturias (ocean liner), a Spanish passenger ship launched in 1914 and sunk off Brazil with heavy loss of life in 1916.
- Spanish ship Asturias
- Spanish ship Princesa de Asturias
