= Spanish ironclad Numancia =

Spanish armored frigate of 1864–1912

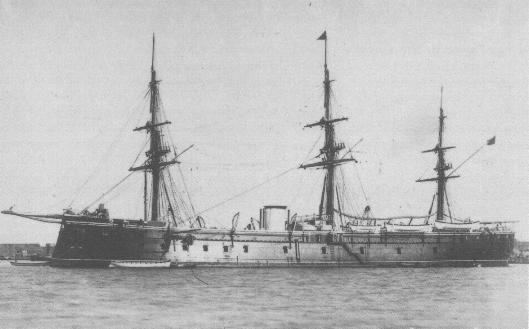
- Numancia at anchor

History

Armada Española Ensign First Spanish Republic Cantonal flag of Cartagena in 1873
- Name: Numancia
- Namesake: The Siege of Numantia of 134–133 BC during the Numantine War
- Builder: Forges et Chantiers de la Méditerranée, La Seyne-sur-Mer, France
- Cost: 8,322,252 pesetas
- Laid down: 22 January 1861
- Launched: 19 November 1863
- Commissioned: 17 December 1864
- Refit: 1896–1898 (as coastal defense ship)
- Decommissioned: 1912
- Stricken: 1912
- Motto: Enloricata navis que primo terram circuivit; ("First ironclad ship to sail around the world")
- Fate: Wrecked 17 December 1916
- Notes: Served Canton of Cartagena July 1873 – January 1874

General characteristics (as built)
- Type: Broadside ironclad (armoured frigate)
- Displacement: 7,305 t (7,190 long tons)
- Length: 95.6 m (313 ft 8 in)
- Beam: 17.3 m (56 ft 9 in)
- Draft: 7.7 m (25 ft)
- Depth: 8.87 m (29.1 ft)
- Installed power: 1,000 hp (746 kW) (nominal); 3,770 ihp (2,811 kW) (indicated)
- Propulsion: 1 horizontal-return connecting-rod steam engine, 8 boilers, 1 shaft
- Sail plan: Ship rig; 1,846 m^{2} (19,870 sq ft)
- Speed: 12.7 knots (23.5 km/h; 14.6 mph) (steam)
- Range: 3,000 nautical miles (5,600 km; 3,500 mi) at 10 knots (19 km/h; 12 mph)
- Complement: 561
- Armament: As built; 40 × 68-pounder (31 kg) 200 mm (7.9 in) smoothbore guns; 1868: 6 x 300-pounder (136 kg) Armstrong rifled guns; 3 x 180-pounder (82 kg) Armstrong guns; 16 × 68-pounder (31 kg) 200 mm (7.9 in) smoothbore guns; 1876: 8 x 250 mm (9.8 in) Armstrong 300-pounder (136 kg) rifled guns; 3 x Woolwich 200 mm (7.9 in) 180-pounder (82 kg) guns; 8 x Palliser 160 mm (6.3 in) guns; 1885: 8 x Armstrong 254 mm (10 in) 300-pounder (136 kg) guns; 7 x Armstrong 203 mm (8 in) 180-pounder (82 kg) guns; 1 x 90 mm (3.5 in) Hontoria saluting gun; 2 x Hontoria 70 mm (2.8 in) 68-pounder (31 kg) guns; 8 x 25-millimetre machine guns; 1898: 4 x Hontoria 200 mm (7.9 in) guns; 10 Hontoria 140 mm (5.5 in) quick-firing guns; 10 x smaller guns; 2 x torpedo tubes; 1900; 4 x Hontoria 200 mm (7.9 in) guns; 3 x Schneider-Canet 150 mm (5.9 in) quick-firing guns; 10 x Hontoria 140 mm (5.5 in) quick-firing guns; 12 x Škoda 47 mm (1.9 in) guns; 2 x torpedo tubes
- Armor: Belt: 100–130 mm (3.9–5.1 in); Battery: 120 mm (4.7 in)
- Notes: Converted to coastal defense ship 1896–1898

Numancia was a Spanish Navy armored frigate in commission from 1864 to 1912. Her long and active career included stints with the Spanish Royal Navy (Armada Real), the navy of the First Spanish Republic, and several months of operations in support of the Canton of Cartagena. She saw combat in the Chincha Islands War in 1865–1866, the Cantonal Rebellion in 1873–1874, the First Melillan campaign in 1893–1894, and the Second Melillan campaign in 1909. Between 1864 and 1867 she made the first circumnavigation of the Earth by an ironclad warship, and in 1877 she became one of the first two Spanish Navy ships to be electrified. Converted into a coastal defense ship between 1896 and 1898, she was decommissioned in 1912 and was wrecked in 1916 on her way to the shipbreakers for scrapping.

Numancia was named for the Siege of Numantia of 134–133 BC, the culminating event of the Numantine War, in which the native population of Hispania Citerior on the Iberian Peninsula resisted the forces of the Roman Republic.

== Design and description ==
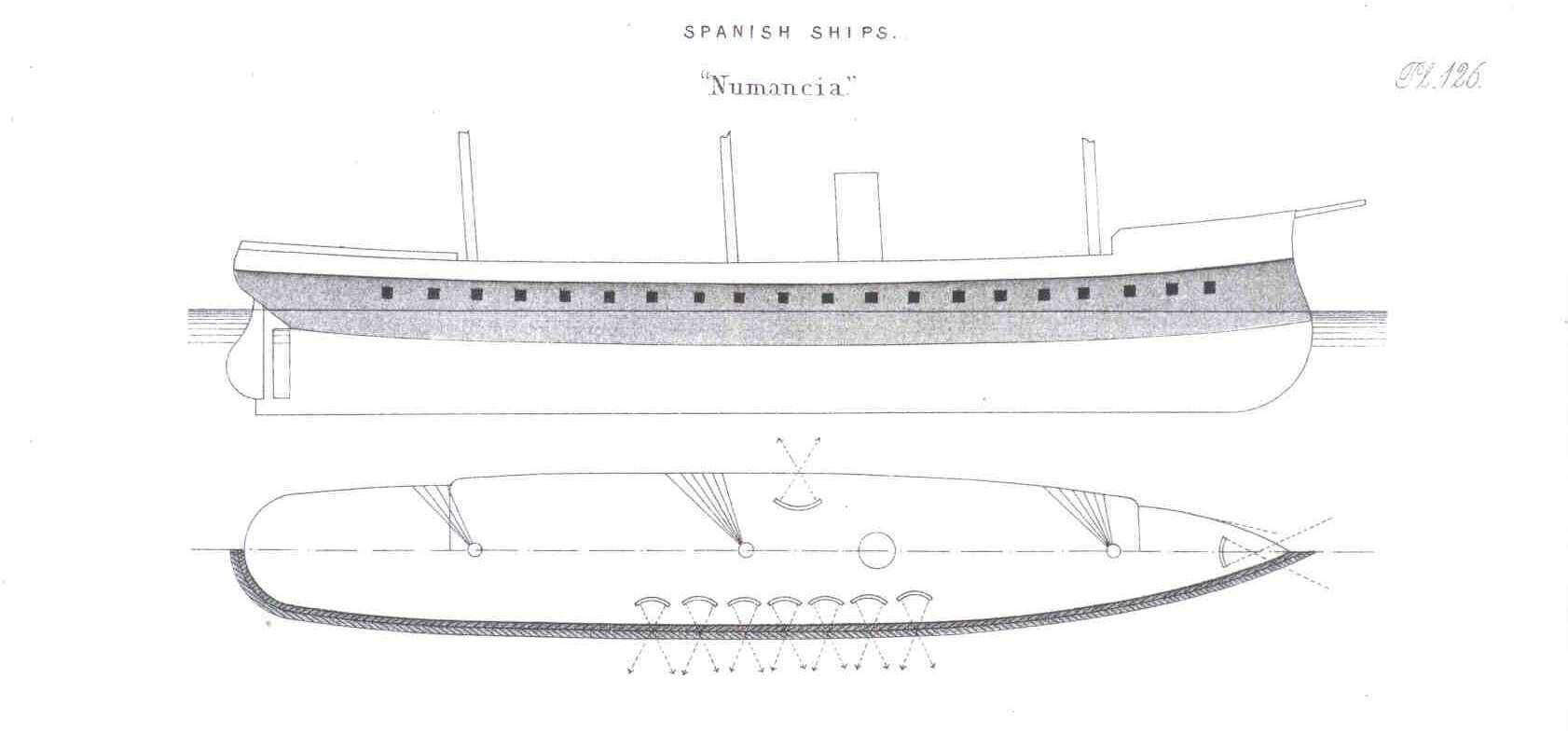
Plan and right-elevation drawing of Numancia; the shaded areas show armor protection

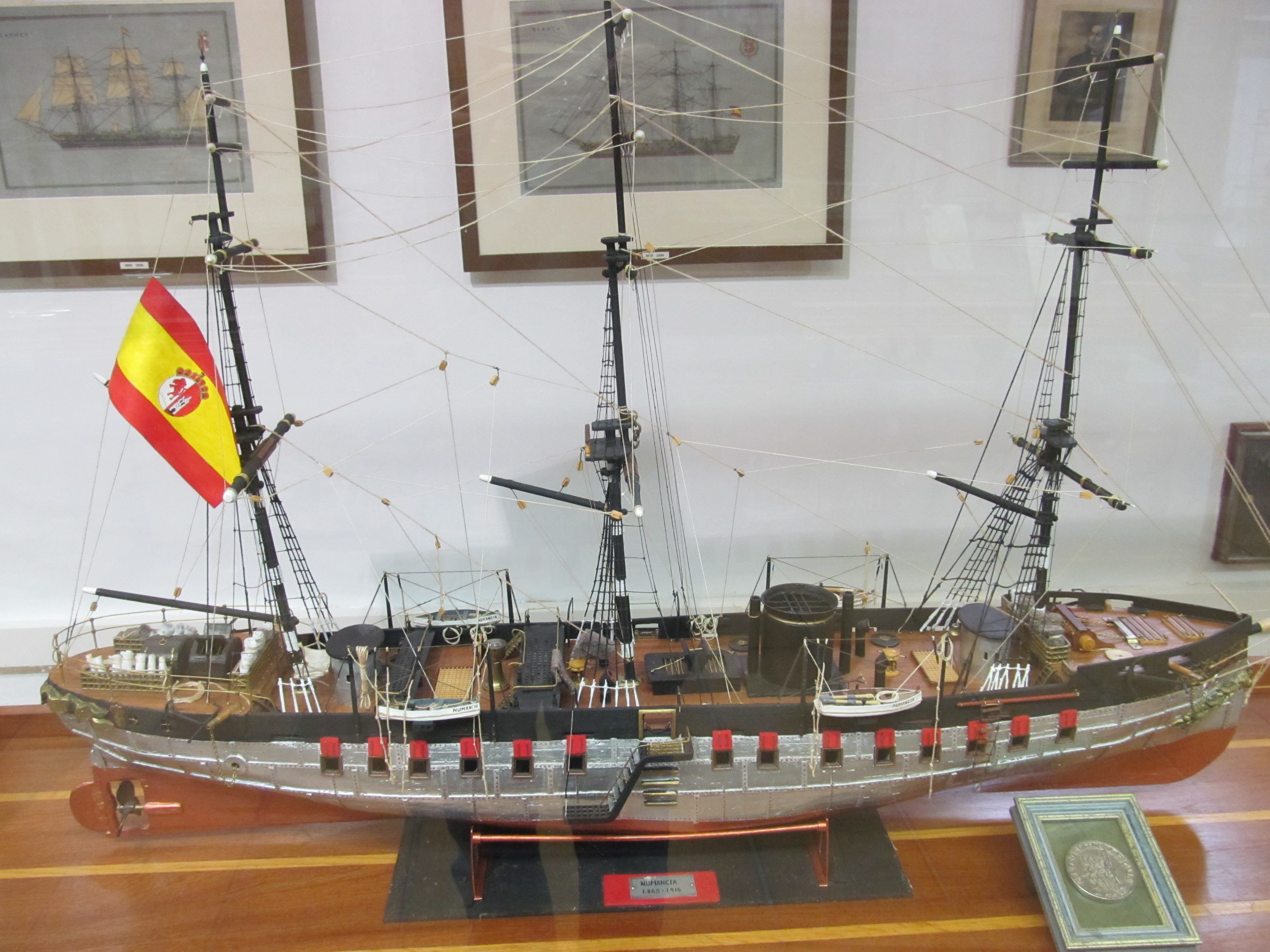
A model of Numancia at Ferrol in 2016

Numancia was 95.6 meters (313 ft 8 in) long at the waterline, had a beam of 17.3 meters (56 ft 9 in) and a draft of 7.7 meters (25 ft 3 in). She displaced 7,305 metric tons (7,190 long tons) and was fitted with a ram bow. Her crew consisted of 561 officers and enlisted men. She had a steam-driven mechanical ventilation system and a drinking water distillation system.

The ship was fitted with a pair of horizontal-return connecting-rod steam engines from her builder that drove one propeller shaft using steam provided by eight cylindrical boilers. The engines were rated at a total of 1,000 nominal horsepower (746 kW) or 3,700 indicated horsepower (2,759 kW) and gave Numancia a speed of 12.7 knots (23.5 km/h; 14.6 mph); according to one source, she made 13 knots (24 km/h; 15 mph) on trials with her 6.35-metre (20 ft 10 in) propeller turning at 54 revolutions per minute, but during normal operations did not exceed 12 knots (22 km/h; 14 mph). She carried a maximum of 1,100 metric tons (1,083 long tons) of coal, giving her a range of 3,000 nautical miles (5,600 km; 3,500 mi) at 10 knots (19 km/h; 12 mph). She was fitted with a three-masted ship rig with a sail area of 1,846 square meters (19,870 sq ft). Her rudder had a servomotor and her bilge pumps were steam-powered.

The frigate's main battery initially consisted of forty 200-millimeter (7.9 in) smoothbore guns mounted on the broadside, but her armament was changed around 1867 to six 229-millimeter (9 in) and three 200 mm Armstrong-Whitworth guns, and eight Trubia 160-millimeter (6.3 in) guns, all of which were rifled muzzle-loading (RML) weapons. The 229 mm and 160 mm guns were situated on the gun deck while the 200 mm guns were positioned on the main deck. In 1883 Numancia was rearmed with eight Armstrong-Whitworth 254-millimeter (10 in) RML guns and seven 200 mm RMLs. When the ship was refitted in France in 1896–1898, her armament was changed to six Hontoria 160 mm and eight Canet 140-millimeter (5.5 in) (real caliber 138.6 mm) rifled breech-loading guns and a pair of 354-millimeter (14 in) torpedo tubes. According to other sources, her main battery consisted of 164.7 mm (6.5-inch) guns.

Numancia had 1,355 tons of armor. She had a complete wrought iron waterline belt of 130-millimeter (5.1 in) armor plates which extended to 2.3 metres (7 ft 7 in) below the waterline. Above the belt, the guns were protected by a 120-millimeter (4.7 in) strake of armor that extended the length of the ship. She had two armored conning towers for her commanding officer and helmsman, each with 12-centimeter (4.7 in) thick iron armor plate backed by a solid wood structure. The deck was unarmored.

== Construction and commissioning ==
In 1859, the Spanish Cortes Generales voted an extraordinary credit, increased in 1861 to 175 million pesetas, for the construction of 12 sailing frigates and steam frigates and two armoured frigates, Numancia and Vitoria. The Kingdom of Spain signed a contract in Madrid with the French company Société Nouvelle des Forges et Chantiers de la Méditerranée on 15 April 1862 to construct Numancia. The engineer Verloque designed Numancia, and her keel was laid on 19 September 1862 at a shipyard at La Seyne-sur-Mer, France. She was launched on 19 November 1863 and commissioned on 17 December 1864. Her construction cost was 8,322,252 pesetas.

== Service history ==
=== 1864–1865 ===
After commissioning, Numancia made her delivery voyage from Toulon, France, to Cartagena, Spain, in December 1864, testing her navigation capabilities and armament along the way. At the Arsenal de Cartagena, her guns were fitted and her full crew reported aboard. On 24 December 1864 Capitán de navío (Ship-of-the-line captain) Casto Méndez Núñez, a future contralmirante (counter admiral), became Numancia′s commanding officer and Capitán de fragata (Frigate captain) Juan Bautista Antequera y Bobadilla, a future vicealmirante (vice admiral) and Minister of the Navy, became her second-in-command.

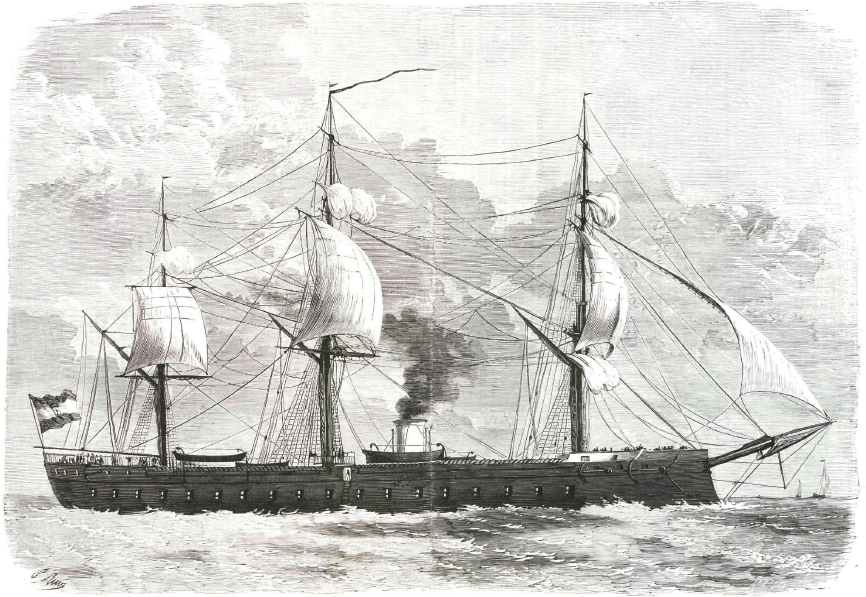
Numancia underway in 1865.

Assigned to the Pacific Squadron amid growing tensions between Spain and its former colonies Chile and Peru, Numancia got underway from Cartagena on 8 January 1865 and arrived at Cádiz on the morning of 11 January. At Cádiz, she prepared for a lengthy deployment, and was overloaded with as much coal and gunpowder and as many projectiles and provisions as she could carry. This increased her draft to 9.96 metres (32 ft 8 in) at the stern and 8.36 metres (27 ft 5 in) at the bow, and her displacement rose to 7,700 tons.

Numancia resumed her voyage on the afternoon of 4 February 1865, departing Cádiz at 16:00 with four boilers lit and with provisions for six months, 1,160 tons of coal, gunpowder and projectiles, and a crew of 590 men aboard. The pilot disembarked at 18:00 and she set course for the Cape Verde Islands in good weather with a fresh northwesterly breeze. As she neared the islands, she encountered a storm on 12 February with high waves that struck her broadside, causing her to roll up to 53 degrees, from gunwale to gunwale, submerging her freeboard. She nonetheless weathered the storm without great difficulty and arrived safely at São Vicente in the Cape Verde Islands on 13 February. Ironclad warships were new in the navies of the world in the 1860s, and French and British ironclads had experienced great difficulty when encountering bad weather; foreign navies took note of Méndez Núñez's seamanship in what they viewed as an historic demonstration of the seaworthiness of armoured warships.

After refilling her coal bunkers, Numancia got back underway on 16 February 1865 to begin a transatlantic voyage, initially encountering calm weather in which she made 4 knots (7.4 km/h; 4.6 mph) under sail in light winds after turning off her engine. On 13 March 1865 she arrived at Montevideo, Uruguay, where she met the brigantine Galiano, the screw corvette Wad-Ras, and the transport steamer Marqués de la Victoria. Numancia and Marqués de la Victoria got underway from Montevideo on 2 April 1865, Numancia exchanging 13-gun salutes with foreign warships in the harbor, and proceeded in company to the Strait of Magellan, on the northern shore of which they anchored at Puerto del Hambre so that Numancia could replenish her coal from Marqués de la Victoria. They resumed their voyage on the morning of 19 April, and at 10:00 passed Santa Agueda Hill at the southernmost tip of the mainland of South America and of the Andes. After they anchored for the night at Fortescue Bay, a warship flying no flag approached, and, given the political tensions in the area, Numancia prepared for action, her crew manning battle stations and loading her guns. The arriving warship hoisted the Peruvian flag and the Spaniards recognized her as the Peruvian Navy corvette America, which was making her delivery voyage from the United Kingdom to Peru as Peru armed itself for a possible war with Spain. America passed close to Numancia′s bow and anchored off her starboard beam.

America weighed anchor and departed very early on the morning of 20 April 1865, Numancia following at 07:00 and proceeding at full speed with eight boilers lit in company with Marqués de la Victoria. She sighted Cape Pilares at the western end of the Strait of Magellan at 17:00, and by 18:00 was in the Pacific Ocean, having completed a transit of the strait in ten days. She sighted America trailing behind her, but America soon had to move farther out to sea to avoid excessive rolling. Numancia had no such problems, and on 21 April she turned off her engine and proceeded under sail the rest of the way to Valparaíso, Chile, which she and Marqués de la Victoria reached on 28 April 1865. After Méndez Núñez gathered information from the commanding officer of the screw corvette Vencedora, learning that Spain had reached an agreement with Peru to avoid war and that the Pacific Squadron was at Callao, Peru, Numancia got back underway and made a seven-day voyage in company with Marqués de la Victoria to Callao, anchoring there at 11:00 on 5 May 1865 after exchanging gun salutes with the Pacific Squadron flagship, the screw frigate Villa de Madrid. The two ships thus joined the squadron, which was under the overall command of Vicealmirante (Vice Admiral) José Manuel Pareja. Numancia′s voyage from Cádiz to Callao – during which she had spent 60 days at sea and 30 days in port, traveled 9,000 nautical miles (17,000 km; 10,000 mi), consumed 2,800 tons of coal, and suffered only one death, that of a crewman swept overboard and lost – was an unprecedented one for an ironclad warship of any navy, and Méndez Núñez received a promotion to contralmirante (counter admiral) on 20 June 1865.

=== Chincha Islands War ===
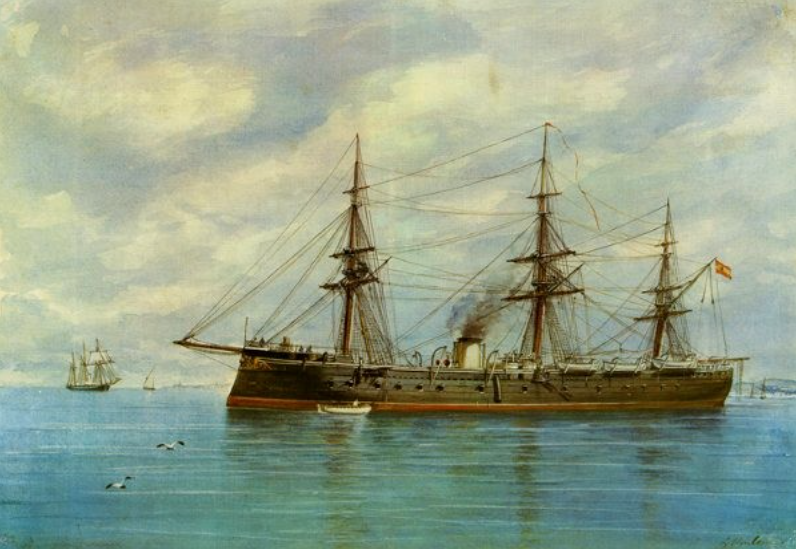
Painting of Numancia by Rafael Monleón y Torres (1843–1900).

The political situation in the southeastern Pacific region further deteriorated during 1865 when Pareja steamed to Valparaíso to settle Spanish claims with Chile. When Chile refused to settle, Pareja announced a blockade of Chilean ports, and the Chincha Islands War broke out between Spain and Chile on 24 September 1865. The blockade spread the Pacific Squadron thinly along the Chilean coast, and early setbacks in the war culminated in a humiliating Spanish naval defeat in the Battle of Papudo on 26 November 1865 in which the Chilean Navy screw corvette Esmeralda captured the Spanish Navy schooner Virgen de Covadonga. News of the defeat prompted Pareja to commit suicide aboard his flagship, the screw frigate Villa de Madrid, off Valparaíso, shooting himself in his cabin on 28 November 1865 while lying on his bed wearing his dress uniform. He was buried at sea. Numancia departed Callao with Marqués de la Victoria in tow on 5 December 1865 and rendezvoused with Villa de Madrid and the screw frigate Berenguela. Méndez Núñez took charge of the Pacific Squadron on 12 December 1865 and transferred to Villa de Madrid. Antequera took command of Numancia.

In January 1866, Ecuador and Peru joined the war against Spain. Méndez Núñez concentrated the Pacific Squadron off Valparaíso, then sent Villa de Madrid and the screw frigate Reina Blanca south to attack a Chilean-Peruvian squadron in the Chiloé Archipelago off Chile, but the resulting Battle of Abtao was indecisive. Méndez Núñez decided to make a second attempt at destroying the allied squadron, this time with Numancia and Reina Blanca under his personal command. On 17 February 1866, the two ships left the waters off Valparaíso and headed south to the Chiloé Archipelago, where they found that the allied ships had retreated into an inlet on the coast of Calbuco Island. Unable to close with the allied ships because of Numancia′s draft, Méndez Núñez ordered his ships to withdraw. The two Spanish ships anchored at Puerto Low on 27 February, at Puerto Oscuro on 1 March, and in the Gulf of Arauco on 9 March 1866. At some point during these operations – sources disagree on whether it was on 6 March or on the afternoon of 9 March — Reina Blanca captured the Chilean sidewheel paddle steamer Paquete de Maule, which was bound from Lota, Chile, to Montevideo carrying naval personnel assigned to join the crews of the Peruvian ironclad turret ship Huáscar and broadside ironclad Independencia there; sources disagree on the number of personnel aboard, claiming both a total of 134 men and of eight officers and 140 enlisted men. On 10 March, Reina Blanca captured two Chilean barges carrying coal and gunpowder, both much needed by the Spanish squadron. Numancia, Reina Blanca, and their three prizes departed the Gulf of Arauco on 12 March to rejoin the rest of the Pacific Squadron off Valparaíso, Numancia and Paquete de Maule doing so on 14 March and Reina Blanca and the two barges arriving on 15 March. Chilean authorities offered to exchange Spanish civilians held in Chile for the men captured aboard Paquete de Maule, but Méndez Núñez turned the offer down. He hoped to exchange his captives for the Spaniards captured aboard Virgen de Covadonga, but the Chileans refused.

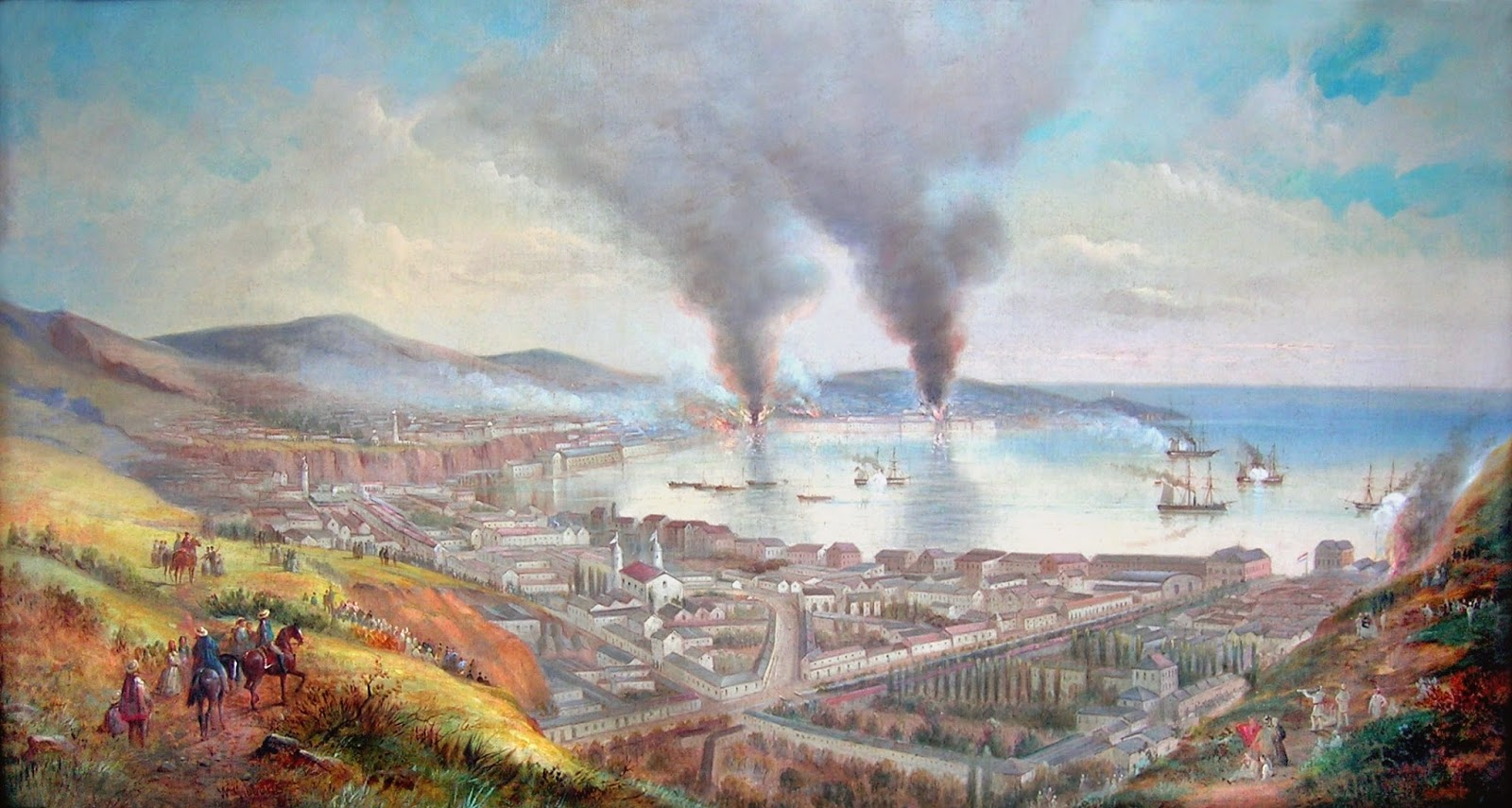
Valparaíso Chile during the bombardment by the admiral Méndez Núñez. (Painting by William Gibbons, ca. 1870)

Bolivia joined the war against Spain on 22 March 1866, closing all the Pacific ports of South America south of Colombia to Spanish ships. Under orders to take punitive action against South American ports, Méndez Núñez selected undefended Valparaíso as his target, although he found the idea of attacking an undefended port repugnant. On the morning of 31 March 1866 his squadron arrived at Valparaíso. Numancia fired two shots to signal the rest of the squadron to open fire at 09:00, then withdrew to a rearward position and took no further part in the bombardment. Facing no opposition, Reina Blanca, Villa de Madrid, the screw frigate Resolución, and Vencedora conducted a three-hour bombardment of Valparaíso while Berenguela and Paquete de Maule stood by offshore to guard against any attempt at escape by Chilean merchant ships. By the time it ended at 12:00, the bombardment had killed two people, injured 10, and sunk 33 merchant ships in the harbor, destroying Chile's merchant fleet. It inflicted US$10 million (equivalent to about US$224 million in 2011) in damage.

Méndez Núñez chose the heavily defended port of Callao for his next attack. He divided the squadron into two divisions, the first made up of Numancia, Berenguela, Reina Blanca, Vencedora, and three auxiliary steamers and the second of Villa de Madrid, Resolución, the screw frigate Almansa, Paquete de Maule, and three transport frigates and, after burning prize ships his squadron had captured, set off on 14 April 1866 for San Lorenzo Island off Callao, the second division getting underway at 09:00 and the first division at 16:00. The first division made the voyage under steam and arrived at San Lorenzo Island on 25 April, while the second division, making the journey under sail and delayed by the low speed of one of the transport frigates, arrived on 27 April 1866. Several days of negotiations began on 26 April, during which Méndez Núñez granted neutral countries a four-day delay in his attack to give them time to salvage their interests in Callao. The Spanish ships used the delay to prepare for the attack: The frigates all lowered their topmasts and main yards and altered their rigging to reduce the likelihood of damage to their masts, set up on-board field hospitals, and painted over the white stripes on their hulls with black paint to reduce the ships' visibility and give Peruvian gunners less of an aiming point.

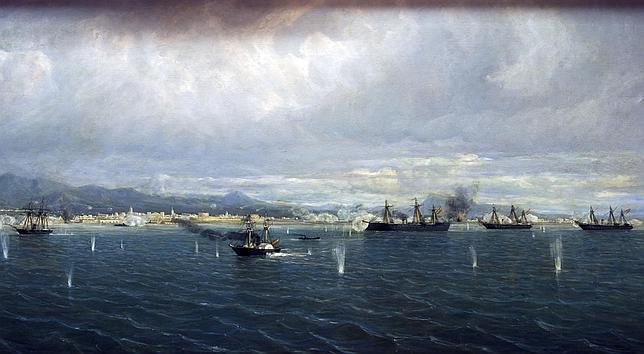
The 19th-century painting The Battle of Callao by Rafael Monleón y Torres (1843–1900). Numancia is at center.

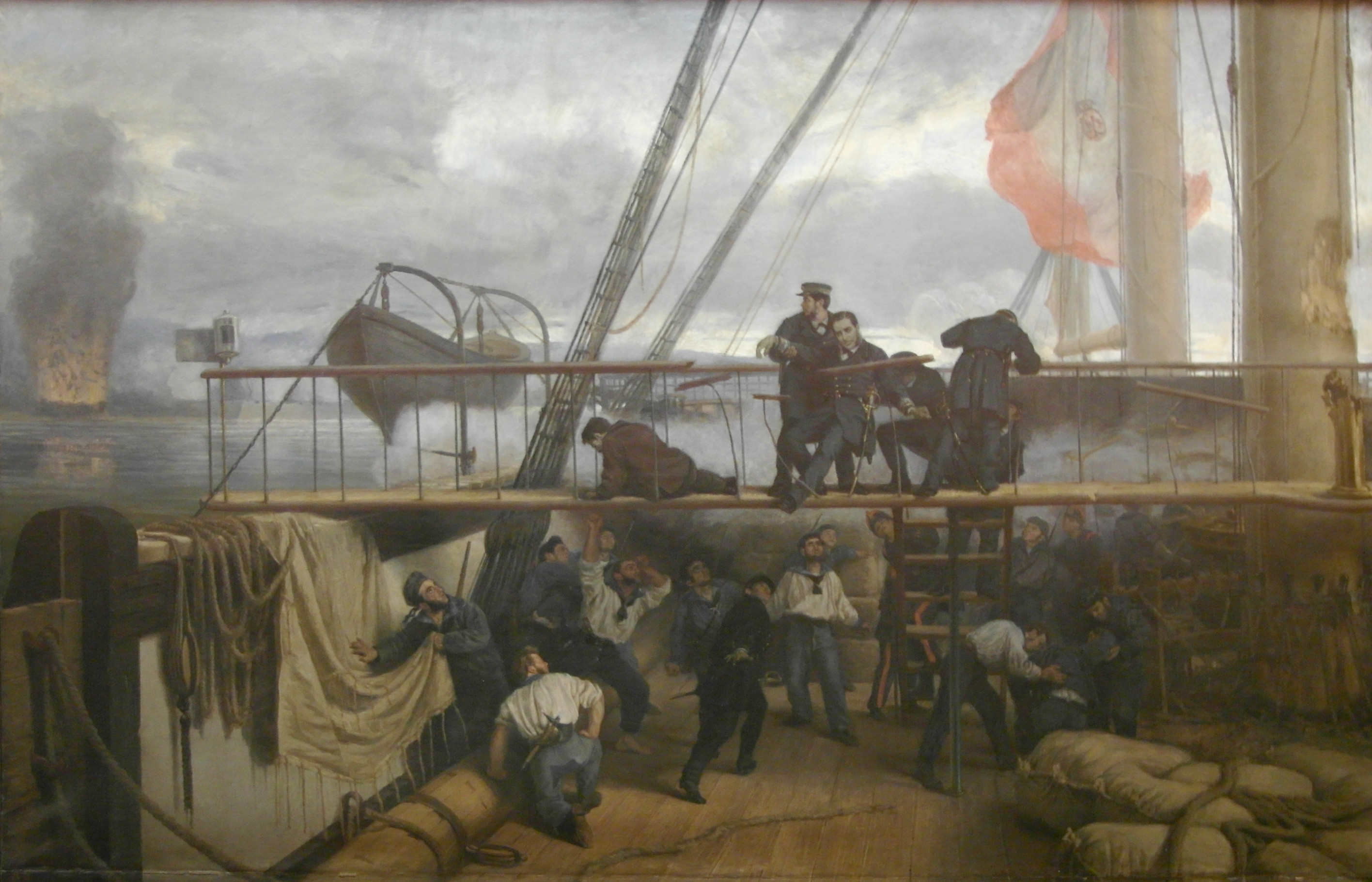
Moment in which the Spanish sailor Casto Méndez Núñez fell wounded on the bridge of the frigate Numancia during the bombardment by the Spanish fleet of the forts of El Callao (2 May 1866). 1878 painting by Antonio Muñoz Degrain (1840–1924).

On the morning of 2 May 1866 the Spanish ships entered Callao Bay, beginning the Battle of Callao, the largest battle of the Chincha Islands War. Vencedora and the auxiliary ships stood off near San Lorenzo Island while the other six Spanish ships attacked Callao, with Numancia (operating as Méndez Núñez's flagship), Almansa, and Resolución assigned to bombard the northern part of the harbor while Reina Blanca, Berenguela, and Villa de Madrid shelled the southern part. Numancia fired the first shot at 11:55, and soon all the Spanish ships were exchanging fire with the Peruvian fortifications. Numancia fired over a thousand rounds and took 45 hits, including four by 500-pound (227 kg) shells and two by 300-pound (136 kg) shells. Méndez Núñez was wounded on Numancia′s bridge, but only one shell penetrated Numancia′s armor; the teak wood underneath it absorbed much of the remaining force of the impact, which resulted merely in a few blown-out rivets and a small leak that her crew repaired quickly. She otherwise suffered only a few dents and scratches. During the bombardment, Numancia accidentally cut an underwater cable used to activate Peruvian mines, rendering the mines useless. By 16:00, only three Peruvian guns still were firing, and Méndez Núñez ordered Numancia, Almansa, Resolución, and Vencedora to shift fire from the harbor defenses to the city itself, but he rescinded the order after his officers advised him that his squadron had run low on explosive shells and would have to use solid shot, which would be ineffective. Running low on ammunition and with only the last three Peruvian guns still firing, the Spanish squadron ceased fire at 16:40 as dusk fell and fog began to form in the harbor.

Méndez Núñez's squadron spent the next several days at San Lorenzo Island, making repairs and tending to casualties. The Chincha Islands War ended in a ceasefire on 9 May 1866, and on 10 May 1866, Mendez Núñez's squadron burned and scuttled Paquete de Maule near San Lorenzo Island and departed. Méndez Núñez led most of the squadron on a voyage eastward around Cape Horn to Rio de Janeiro, Brazil, with Villa de Madrid as his flagship. However, Berenguela′s and Numancia′s temporary repairs at San Lorenzo Island were deemed inadequate for them to make the voyage safely, and Numancia also had exhausted her coal supply, so Méndez Núñez formed a separate division made up of Numancia, Berenguela, Vencedora, Marqués de la Victoria, the steamer Uncle Sam, and the sailing transport Matauara and ordered it to proceed under sail westward across the Pacific to the Philippines in the Spanish East Indies, where Berenguela and Numancia could undergo permanent repairs.

After getting underway from San Lorenzo Island, Numancia′s and Berenguela′s division parted company with the other ships to make its voyage to the Philippines. Numancia was slow under sail, forcing the other ships to use reduced sail so as not to leave her behind. After the first case of scurvy was detected among Berenguela′s crew, however, she and Uncle Sam parted company with Numancia on 15 May 1866 and headed for Papeete on Tahiti in the Society Islands, as did Vencedora on 19 May. On 9 June Berenguela arrived at Papeete, and the rest of the ships straggled in behind her, the last of them, Numancia, arriving on 24 June. After provisioning, fueling, and treating their sick crewmen, the ships resumed their voyage to the Philippines on 17 July 1866. Numancia arrived in the Philippines at Manila on 8 September 1866, Berenguela joined her there on 24 September, and on 13 October 1866 the division's last ship reached Manila.

Numancia′s circumnavigation of the world, 1864–1867. Her route as drawn erroneously omits her stop in the Philippines.

At Manila, Numancia′s crew rested while the ship's bottom was cleaned and pearl divers unwound about 300 metres (985 feet) of the cable she had cut at Callao from her propeller shaft and propeller. On 19 January 1867 she departed Manila. Heading southward across the South China Sea, she called at Batavia on Java in the Netherlands East Indies from 30 January to 19 February. She then crossed the Indian Ocean, rounded the Cape of Good Hope, and arrived at Cape Town in the Cape Colony to take on coal. She next proceeded to Saint Helena in the Atlantic Ocean, where she received orders from the Ministry of the Navy to join Méndez Núñez's squadron at Rio de Janeiro. After reaching South America, she rendezvoused with Méndez at Montevideo, and he ordered her to return to Spain because she had several cases of smallpox on board. Getting underway from Rio de Janeiro on 15 August 1867, she anchored in the Bay of Cádiz on 20 September 1867. After a quarantine period, her crew disembarked and returned home after an absence from Spain of two years, seven months, and six days. Her arrival made her the first armored ship to circumnavigate the world, and she adopted the motto Enloricata navis que primo terram circuivit ("First ironclad ship to sail around the world").

=== 1867–1872 ===
After her arrival in Spain, Numancia underwent repairs. From 27 April to 15 July 1868, she was in the Cartagena Iron Drydock, which had been especially constructed to serve the new Spanish ironclads. In 1868 her armament was also modified: She retained sixteen 200-millimetre (7.9 in) smoothbore guns in her battery, and six 300-pounder (136 kg) Armstrong rifled guns were added. In addition, three 180-pounder (82 kg) Armstrong guns were installed on her deck, two in an armoured redoubt and another on her bow. In June 1869 she was assigned to the Mediterranean Squadron, which also included the armoured frigates Vitoria and Zaragoza, Villa de Madrid, the screw frigate Asturias, and several smaller vessels.

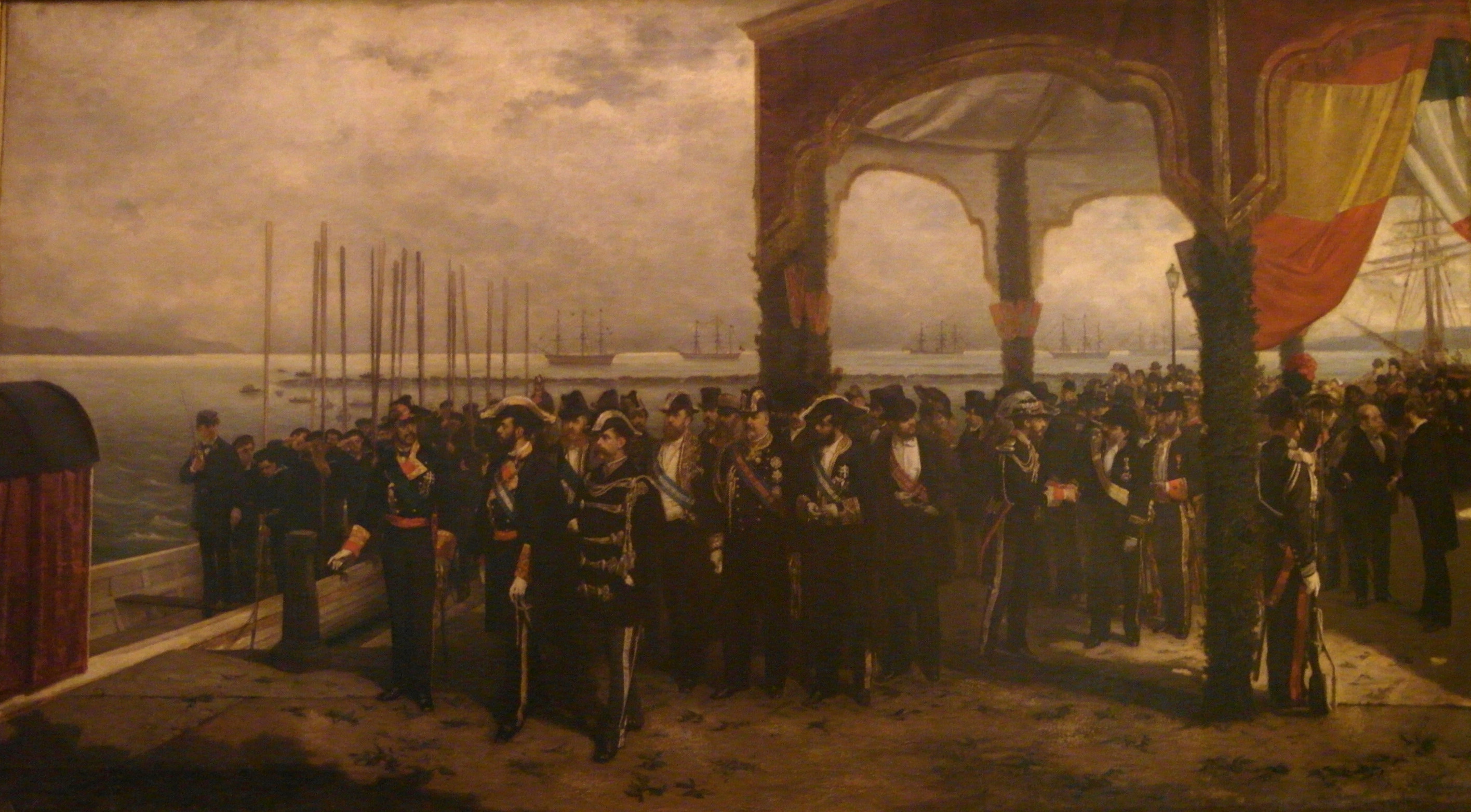
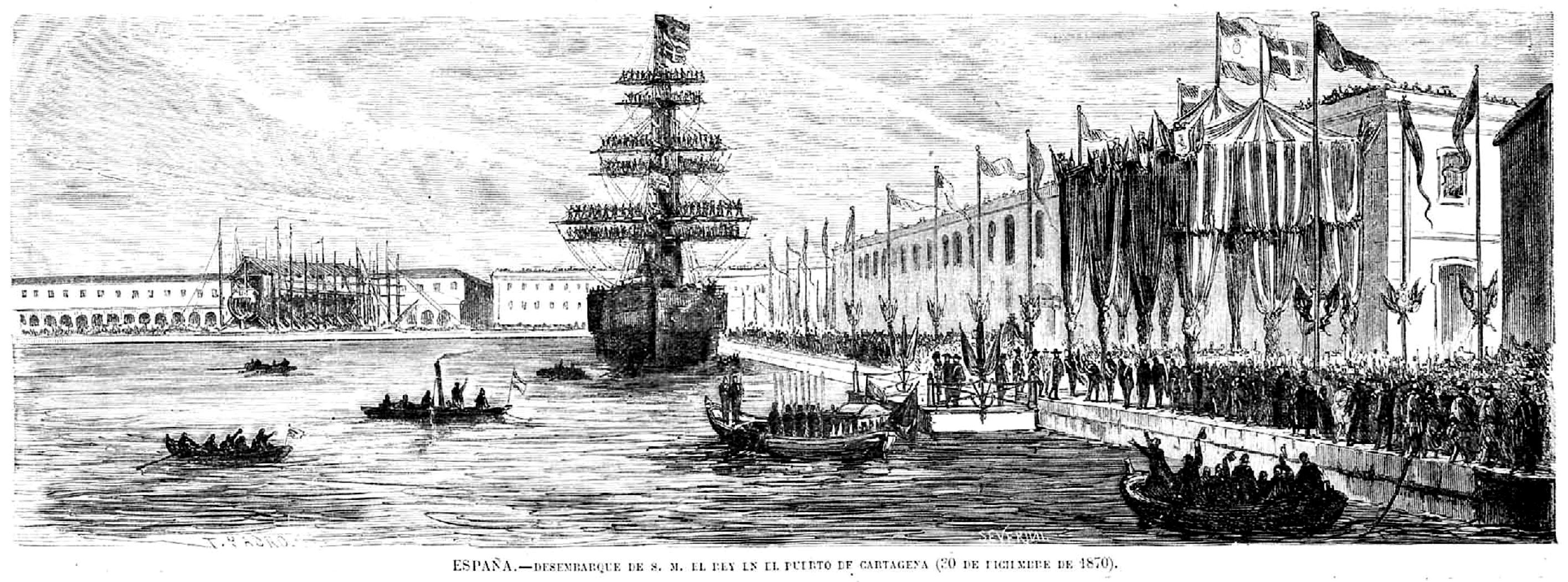
LEFT: Numancia on the Cartagena Iron Drydock in 1868. MIDDLE: Embarkation of Amadeo I of Savoy in the port of La Spezia to travel to Spain to take possession of the throne. 1872 painting by Luis Álvarez Catalá (1836–1901). RIGHT: "Spain — Landing of His Majesty the King in the port of Cartagena (30 December 1870)." Engaving by José Severini (1838–1882) from a drawing by Tomás Padró Pedret (1840–1877) published in La Ilustración Española y Americana on 15 January 1871. Numancia′s crew is depicted manning the yards.

Numancia was anchored at Cartagena on 24 November 1870 when Minister of the Navy José María Beránger Ruiz de Apodaca and President of the Congress of Deputies Manuel Ruiz Zorrilla came aboard. Numancia, Villa de Madrid, and Vitoria then departed Cartagena on 26 November 1870 under the overall command of squadron commander Contralmirante (Counter Admiral) Don José Ignacio Rodríguez de Arias and steamed in company to La Spezia, Italy, where the Spanish dignitaries offered the Spanish crown to Prince Amadeo of Savoy. Amadeo boarded Numancia and the Spanish ships returned to Spain, arriving at Cartagena on 30 December 1870. Amadeo subsequently ruled as Amadeo I of Spain.

Numancia and Villa de Madrid visited Tangier in Morocco in August 1871. Numancia also made a voyage to New York City in 1871, entering dry dock there. In 1872 she served in the Training Squadron.

=== Cantonal Rebellion ===
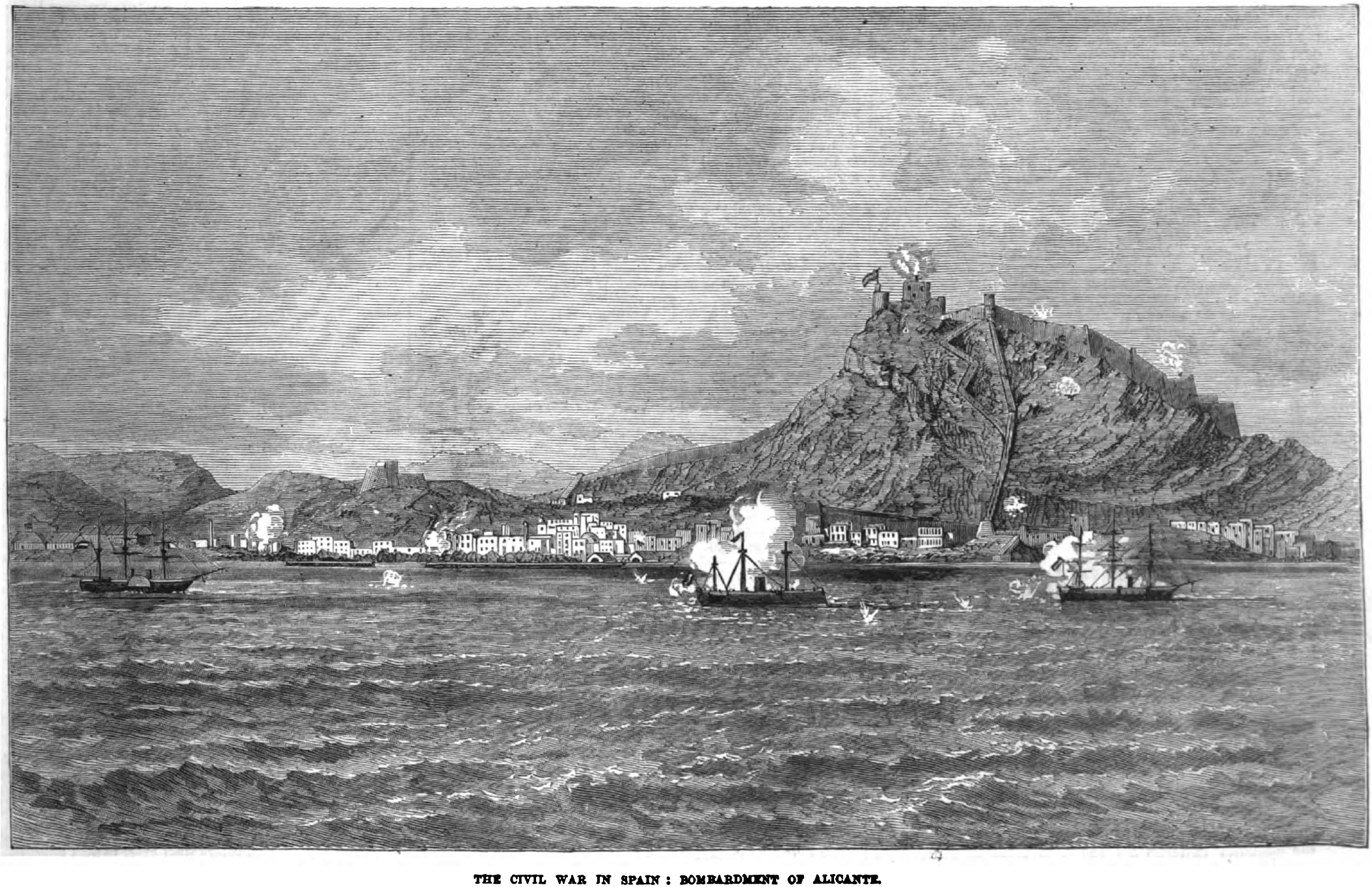
"The Civil War in Spain, Bombardment of Alicante." Illustration for The Illustrated London News, published 11 October 1873.

Amadeo I abdicated on 11 February 1873, and on 8 June 1873 the Cortes Generales proclaimed the Spanish First Republic. The central government delayed the implementation of expected reforms, and on 12 July 1873 the Canton of Cartagena rebelled, declaring itself independent and seeking to radically restructure the Spanish government based on the political theory of cantonalism. Most of the Spanish fleet, including Numancia, Vitoria, the armoured frigate Tetuán, Méndez Núñez (the former Resolución), Almansa, the paddle gunboats Fernando el Católico and Vigilante, the screw schooner Ferrolana, and other smaller ships sided with the Cantonalists. Numancia became the most prominent ship of the Cantonalist fleet. The central government considered cantonalism a separatist movement, and combat broke out between centralist and Cantonalist forces.

Numancia, Tetuán, and Fernando el Católico departed Cartagena on 25 August 1873. In the days that followed, they cruised off Almería and Alicante but did not encounter any centralist ships. Numancia, Méndez Núñez, and Fernando el Católico took part in a landing at Águilas on 17 September 1873 to seize money and supplies, and Numancia, Tetuán and Méndez Núñez bombarded Alicante on 27 September 1873, firing a combined 500 rounds.

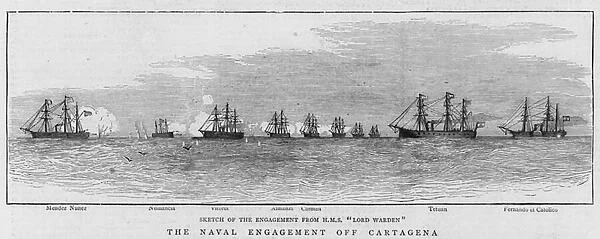
"The Naval Engagement off Cartagena." Drawing of the Battle of Portman published in The Graphic on 25 October 1873. Numancia is second from left in the foreground.

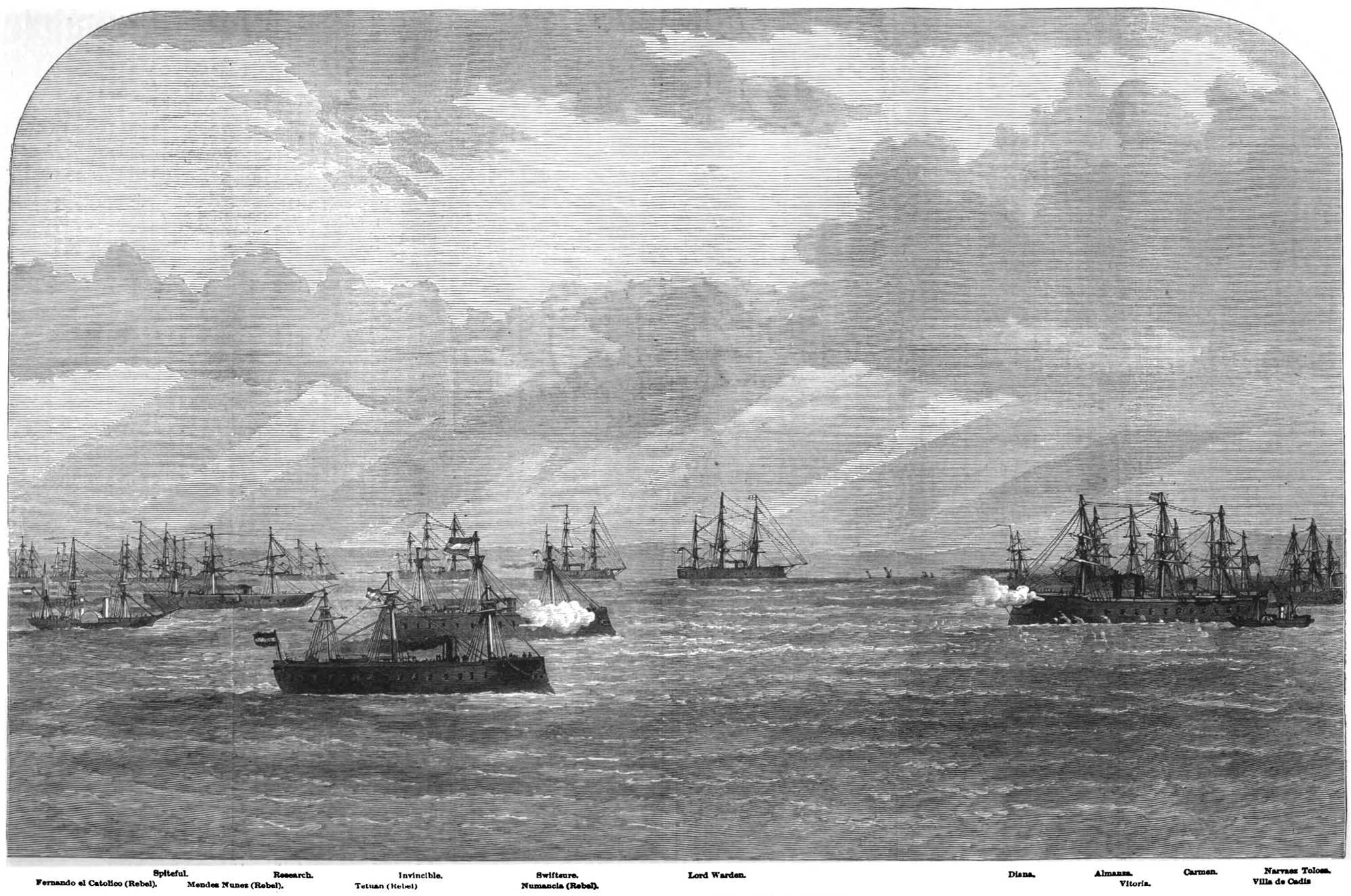
"The Civil War in Spain, the Battle of Escombrera, a naval battle off Carthagena." Drawing of the Battle of Portman published in The Illustrated London News on 1 November 1873.

On 10 October 1873, the centralist squadron, commanded by Contralmirante (Counter Admiral) Miguel Lobo y Malagamba, arrived off Cartagena to establish a blockade. It included Vitoria (Lobo's flagship) and Almansa, both of which had been captured from the Cantonalists and turned over to the central government, as well as the screw frigates Carmén and Navas de Tolosa, the corvette Diana, the schooner Prosperidad, and the paddle gunboats Colón and Ciudad de Cádiz.

Numancia took part in an attempt to break the blockade on 11 October 1873. Lacking naval officers, the Cantonal squadron was under the command of a Spanish Army cavalry general who made Numancia his flagship. In addition to Numancia, which was under the command of a merchant captain, the Cantonal squadron included Tetuán, Méndez Núñez, and Despertador del Cantón (the former Fernando el Católico). The Cantonalist ships gathered between 07:00 and 09:00 off Escombreras, an islet at the mouth of the harbor, and at 10:30 they got underway for the open sea, escorted by British Royal Navy, French Navy, Imperial German Navy, and Italian Regia Marina (Royal Navy) warships. The Cantonalist ships adopted a rhomboidal formation with Numancia in the lead, Méndez Núñez to port, Tetuán to starboard, and Despertador del Cantón bringing up the rear. Near Cape Palos, they sighted the centralist squadron about 6 nautical miles (11 km; 6.9 mi) to the south at 11:30, and the Battle of Portmán began.

With her greater speed, Numancia charged toward Vitoria and got too far ahead of the rest of her squadron. The centralist squadron turned to port to face the attack, and Vitoria, which was leading the centralist squadron, opened fire at Numancia with her bow guns at 12:10. The shots fell short, and Numancia rushed past Vitoria as the two ships exchanged broadsides. Numancia cut through the centralist line between Diana and Almansa, then turned to starboard and crossed Carmén′s and Navas de Tolosa′s sterns as they fired at her, nearly all of their shots falling short. With this maneuver, she cut off Ciudad de Cádiz from the rest of the centralist squadron. Ciudad de Cádiz put on maximum sail and fled on an east-northeasterly wind with Numancia in hot pursuit. Leaving Almansa, Carmén, and Navas de Tolosa to face the approaching Tetuán and Méndez Núñez, Vitoria broke off to come to Ciudad de Cádiz′s assistance.

After a chase of 4 nautical miles (7.4 km; 4.6 mi), Numancia caught up to Ciudad de Cádiz. Discerning that Numancia was preparing to ram her, Ciudad de Cádiz feinted to starboard, then, when Numancia turned to cut her off, made a sudden turn to port, spoiling the ramming attempt, and cut across Numancia′s stern before Numancia could fire a shot. Ciudad de Cádiz passed south of the rest of the centralist squadron, fortunate to have avoided destruction and escaping with only a single hit to her paddle wheel. Meanwhile, Vitoria opened fire on Numancia with her bow guns and scored a hit on Numancia′s central battery. Numancia responded by returning to Cartagena at full speed to seek shelter under the guns of the coastal fortifications. Vitoria chased Numancia, but lacked the speed to catch her. Numancia played no further meaningful role during the battle, standing out of the harbor for a few minutes when Tetuán used a gunshot to signal that she needed assistance, but quickly retreating again. The battle ended around 15:00 with the withdrawal of the Cantonalist squadron to Cartagena and the centralist blockade unbroken.

On 13 October 1873, the four Cantonalist ships again sortied from Cartagena with the screw schooner Buenaventura following at a distance and flying the Red Cross flag. This time, Numancia held her position in the Canontalist formation, and when Tetuán opened fire on Lobo's blockading squadron Lobo avoided combat, lifted the blockade, and withdrew to the Bay of Gibraltar, hoping to receive reinforcements in the form of the armoured frigate Zaragoza and the paddle gunboat Ulloa. Outraged by Lobo's withdrawal, the central government relieved him of command on 15 October and replaced him with Contralmirante (Counter Admiral) Nicolás Chicarro.

Numancia, Méndez Núñez, and Despertador del Cantón departed Cartagena on 17 October 1873 to transport several cantonal leaders to Valencia and Barcelona. During the voyage, Numancia collided with Despertador del Cantón off Alicante on either 19 or 20 October, according to different sources, and Despertador del Cantón sank with the loss of 12 lives and injuries to 17 others. After the accident, Numancia and Méndez Núñez returned to Cartagena.

Chicarro took command of the central government squadron on 18 October 1873 and reinstated the central government's blockade of Cartagena on 23 October 1873. Like Lobo, Chicarro avoided combat, despite the arrival of Zaragoza, which gave him a squadron that included two armored frigates.

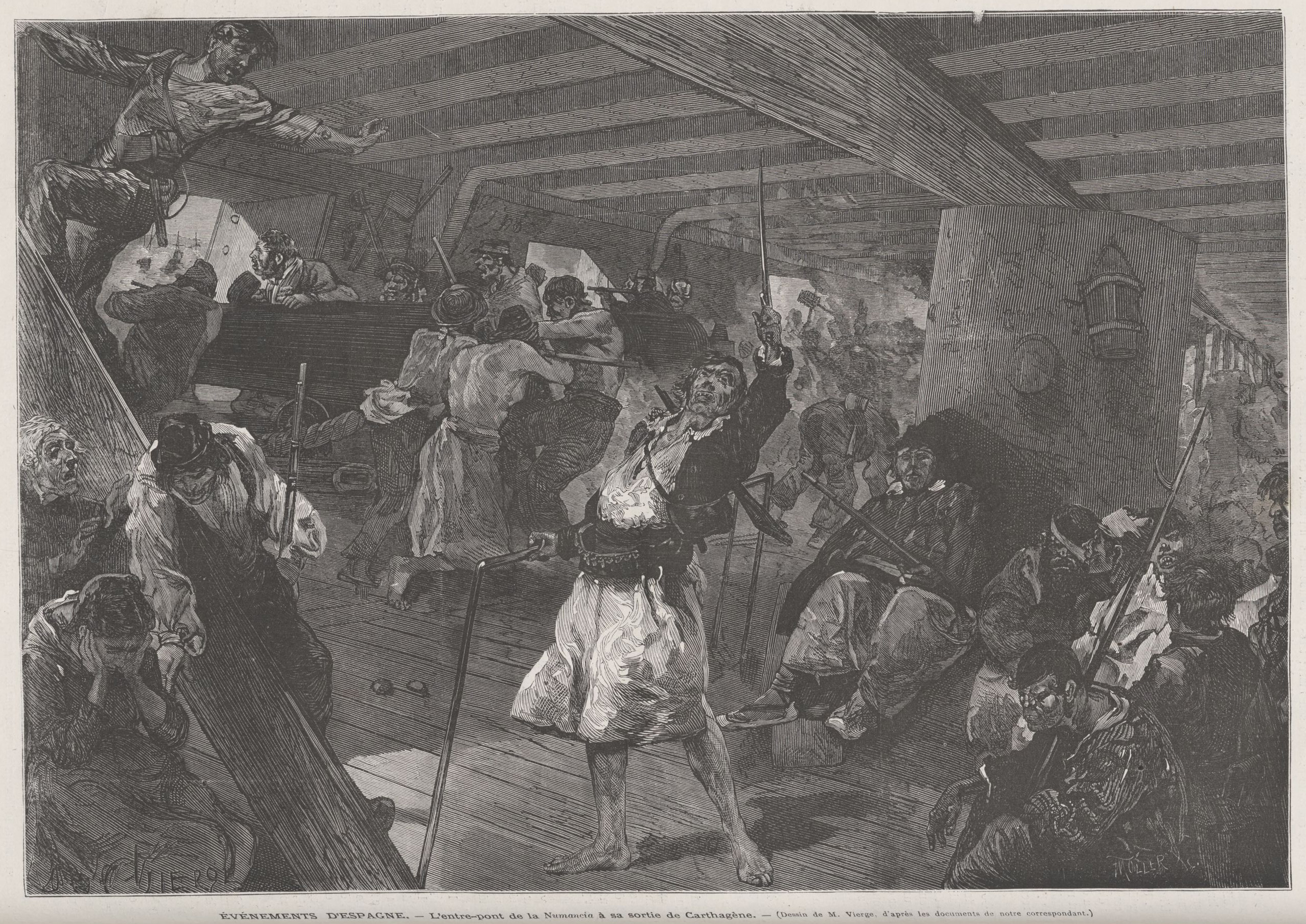
"Events in Spain. — The between-deck of the Numancia as it leaves Cartagena." Drawing by Daniel Vierge (1851–1904) published in Le Monde Illustré on 31 January 1874.

The Cantonal Rebellion collapsed, and the Canton of Cartagena surrendered to central government forces on 12 January 1874. Cantonal leaders and about 1,750 soldiers, volunteers, and family members who had supported the rebellion boarded Numancia and the steamer Darro to flee Spain. At the time, Chicarro's central government squadron was blockading Cartagena, with Vitoria and Zaragoza in line ahead, Almansa and Carmén on either side, and Navas de Tolosa in reserve. As Numancia emerged from the harbor on 12 January, Vitoria and Zaragoza opened fire on her. She stopped her engines, which Chicarro interpreted as her surrendering to him, and he ordered his ships to cease fire and reduce speed. However, Numancia suddenly put on full speed, passed across the bows of Vitoria and opened fire, cutting between Carmén and Zaragoza. The central government squadron captured Darro, but Numancia reached the open sea and made for French Algeria with 2,000 people aboard, including 1,635 Cantonalist rebels as passengers. Almansa, Carmén, and Vitoria pursued her, but she escaped and reached Mers El Kébir near Oran on 13 January 1874. French authorities at Oran handed her over to Chicarro on 17 January 1874, and she thus returned to Spanish Navy control.

=== 1874–1885 ===
In 1876, Numancia underwent another modification of her armament, from which she emerged with eight 250-millimetre (9.8 in) Armstrong 300-pounder (136 kg) rifled guns, three Woolwich 200-millimetre (7.9 in) 180-pounder (82 kg) guns, and eight Palliser 160-millimetre (6.3 in) guns. In July 1876, she went to the port of Saint Jean de Luz, France, accompanied by the screw schooners Concordia and Consuelo and the paddle gunboat Ferrolano to pick up the former Queen regnant Isabella II and her daughters, ending Isabella II's exile in France, which had begun in 1868. Upon Numancia′s arrival at Sardinero in Santander, where the royal family spent the summer, Isabella II was received by her son King Alfonso XII while other warships, including Reina Blanca, attended Numancia.

The Training Squadron was formed again in October 1876 and Numancia was assigned to it. Contralmirante (Counter Admiral) Antequera, Numancia′s former commanding officer, commanded the squadron. The squadron, which also included Vitoria, Reina Blanca, and the screw corvette África, was based at Santa Pola. Numancia subsequently was a part of various training squadrons formed between 1876 and 1879. In 1877, electricity was installed aboard her at Barcelona, she and Vitoria becoming the first ships of the Spanish Navy to be electrified. On 25 September 1877, King Alfonso XII began a series of voyages in the Mediterranean Sea aboard Numancia, escorted by Reina Blanca, Vitoria, and the screw corvette Africa. During these voyages, the ships visited Alicante, Valencia, Tarragona, Barcelona, Roses, Mahón, Palma de Mallorca, Santa Pola, Almería, and Málaga.

On the morning of 24 October 1879, Numancia departed Cartagena with King Alfonso XII and Queen Maria Cristina aboard for a voyage to Cádiz escorted by Reina Blanca and Villa de Madrid, the corvette Tornado, and the paddle gunboat Isabel la Católica. The ships began naval exercises on the morning of 25 October off Cabo de Gata. Alfonso XII and Maria Christina disembarked at Cádiz on 28 October 1879.

Numancia again was a part of various training squadrons formed between 1882 and 1888. King Alfonso XII and Queen Maria Christina again visited the Training Squadron in September 1883 when it consisted of Numancia, Vitoria, Carmén, and the screw frigate Lealtad. On 22 November 1883 the Imperial German Navy corvette SMS Prinz Adalbert arrived at Valencia with the German Crown Prince Frederick on board, accompanied by the corvette SMS Sofía and the aviso SMS Loreley. The ships of the Training Squadron — Numancia, Vitoria, Lealtad, and Carmén — escorted the German ships.

In the summer of 1884, Numancia was part of a Training Squadron commanded by Contralmirante (Counter Admiral) Francisco de Paula Llanos y Herrera. King Alfonso XII and Queen Maria Christina embarked on Vitoria on 19 August 1884 for a voyage from Gijón to La Coruña and Ferrol escorted by Numancia, Carmén, Lealtad, and the gunboat Paz. The unprotected cruiser Navarra joined the squadron at Ferrol, they continued the journey along the coast of Spain until Alfonso XII and Maria Christina disembarked at Vigo on 25 August 1884.

In 1885, Numancia′s armament again was revised, this time altered to eight Armstrong 254-millimetre (10 in) 300-pounder (136 g) guns, seven Armstrong 203-millimetre (8 in) 180-pounder (82 kg) guns, two Hontoria 70-millimetre (2.8 in) 68-pounder (31 kg) guns, eight 25-millimetre machine guns, and a 90-millimetre (3.5 in) Hontoria saluting gun. Still in the Training Squadron, she was at Cartagena with other ships of the squadron — Méndez Núñez, Reina Blanca, Zaragoza, and the torpedo boats Riquel and Cástor — during an attempted uprising there at the end of April 1885 promoted by Manuel Ruiz Zorrilla. Sailors of the squadron took action to ensure that the uprising failed. The sailors also foiled a similar attempted uprising at Cartagena in November 1885.

=== 1886–1899 ===
The Training Squadron – made up of Numancia, Vitoria, Lealtad, the screw frigate Gerona, Paz, Cástor, and the torpedo boat Rigel — anchored at Mahón on Menorca in the Balearic Islands on 18 March 1886. Almansa and Navarra later joined them there amid tensions with the German Empire over control of the Caroline Islands in the Spanish East Indies. The squadron received orders to prepare to steam to the Pacific Ocean to defend the Carolines, as well to prepare to defend the Balearics in case Germany tried to seize them as a bargaining chip in peace talks. In the end, no conflict broke out between Spain and Germany.

In mid-January 1887, Numancia, serving as the flagship of the Training Squadron, made a Mediterranean cruise with Gerona and the unprotected cruiser Castilla during which the ships visited several ports. The ships called at Genoa, Italy, from 24 January to 2 February 1887, then departed bound for La Spezia. Scheduled visits to ports in Sicily were canceled when cholera broke out in Catania, but the squadron visited Algiers and other ports in North Africa before concluding the cruise.

Numancia was among Spanish Navy ships at Barcelona on 20 May 1888 for the opening of the 1888 Barcelona Universal Exposition, flying the flag of the Minister of the Navy, Contralmirante (Counter Admiral) Rafael Rodríguez de Arias. During July, August, and September 1888 she made a voyage through the Mediterranean Sea, Tyrrhenian Sea, and Adriatic Sea, visiting Palermo in Sicily, Brindisi in Italy, Pola and Trieste in Austria-Hungary, Venice and Ancona in Italy, Corfu, and Malta. She arrived at Toulon, France, on 27 August 1888, and was among Training Squadron ships present when a French shipyard handed over the new battleship Pelayo to the Spanish Navy at Toulon on 9 September 1888. Clashes in Morocco in September 1889 led to the Training Squadron – made up of Numancia, Pelayo, and Castilla and anchored at Cádiz – being sent to Alhucemas on 23 September.

During the First Melillan campaign in 1893–1894, Numancia deployed from Málaga to Moroccan waters for operations against the Riffian tribes of northeastern Morocco. She bombarded several coastal villages on 4 October 1893.

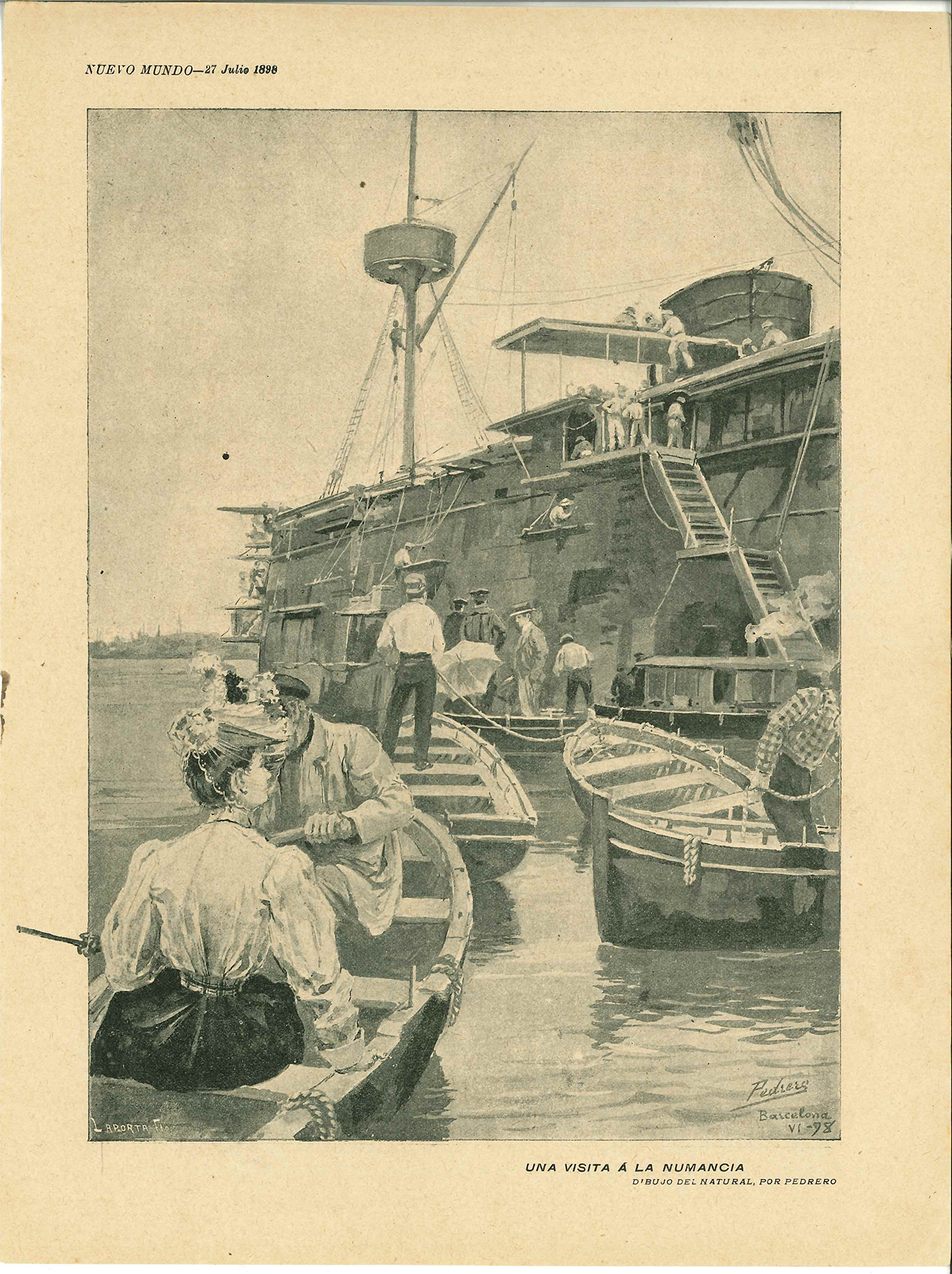
"Visit to Numancia." Drawing by Mariano Pedrero (1865–1927) published in Nuevo Mundo on 27 July 1898.

With their hulls still in good condition, Numancia and Vitoria were sent to Toulon during the first half of 1896 for conversion into coastal defence ships. Numancia received new boilers and her rigging was removed and replaced by two small masts with tops. Her 160 mm (6.3 in) guns were removed (and later were installed on the new protected cruiser Lepanto, as were those of Vitoria) and her armament was changed to four Hontoria 200-millimetre (7.9 in) guns, 10 Hontoria 140-millimetre (5.5 in) quick-firing guns, 10 smaller guns, and two torpedo tubes. When the Spanish-American War broke out in April 1898 her conversion still was incomplete, but the merchant steamer Cabo de Naos towed her from Toulon to Barcelona to avoid her being interned by neutral France. The war ended in August 1898, and Numancia returned to Toulon for the installation of her new boilers and a thorough overhaul of her steam engines. The heavy losses the Spanish Navy had suffered in the war with the United States left it with a shortage of ships, and when Numancia reentered service she returned to the Training Squadron, in which she served with Vitoria, Pelayo, and the armored cruiser Emperador Carlos V.

=== 1900–1912 ===
Numancia′s armament again was altered in 1900. The changes left her with four Hontoria 200-millimetre (7.9 in) guns, three Schneider-Canet 150-millimetre (5.9 in) quick-firing guns, 10 Hontoria 140-millimetre (5.5 in) quick-firing guns, 12 Škoda 47 millimetres (1.9 in) guns, and two torpedo tubes.

In November 1902 Numancia was ordered to Ceuta on the coast of North Africa to protect Spanish citizens in Morocco during unrest in that country.

As the Perdicaris affair, a crisis between Morocco and the United States, played out in May and June 1904, Numancia and Pelayo arrived at Tangier on 6 June 1904 because of Spanish fears that the United States might use the incident to force Morocco to give it a port.

In 1907, King Alfonso XIII held a reception, dinner, and festivities aboard Numancia for the British King Edward VII, who visited Cartagena with a powerful Royal Navy squadron from 8 to 10 April 1907.

Numancia′s last war service took place in 1909 when she took part in the Second Melillan campaign in Morocco. After Emperador Carlos V had to enter dry dock, Numancia replaced her as flagship of the Second Division, operating along the Moroccan coast and bombarding Moroccan positions at Wolf Ravine (Barranco del Lobo) and Marchica.

Numancia left the Training Squadron in 1910, and on 7 October 1910 she was present at Lisbon, Portugal, when the First Portuguese Republic was proclaimed. She served on coastal defense duty at Tangier in 1911 and 1912.

On the night of 1–2 August 1911, a mutiny occurred aboard Numancia while she was at Tangier when 14 anarchist sailors revolted in the hope of seizing control of the ship. If successful, they planned to proclaim a Spanish republic, threaten to bombard Málaga and spur an uprising by republican forces there, and then steam to either Barcelona or Valencia, where they expected a popular uprising to occur that would lead to the establishment of a republic. The muntineers were subdued and arrested that same night. Numancia departed Tangier on 3 August, proceeded to the Arsenal de la Carraca in San Fernando, Spain, and held a court martial in which stoker Antonio Sánchez Moya, the ringleader, was sentenced to death and either six or eight (according to different sources) other sailors to life imprisonment. At 09:00 on either 8 or 9 August 1911 (according to different sources) Sánchez was given communion and then immediately executed by firing squad in the presence of Minister of the Navy José Pidal Rebollo aboard Numancia outside the port of Cádiz. King Alfonso XIII's indifference to Sánchez's fate led to riots in Barcelona and Cádiz. Although government officials first tried to downplay the seriousness of the incident, a report made public on 8 August 1911 concluded that over 100 sailors had been involved in the plot.

== Decommissioning and loss ==
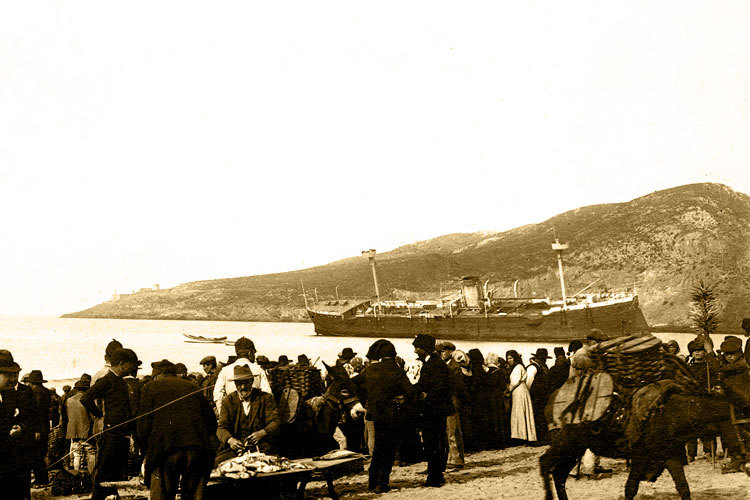
The wreck of Numancia.

Numancia was decommissioned in 1912 and the Spanish Navy made plans to sell her for scrapping. Public opinion and a press campaign sought to have her preserved as a museum ship, but these efforts failed, and in 1916 she was sold for scrapping to a company in Bilbao. The first two efforts to tow her from the Arsenal de la Carraca to Bilbao failed. When a third towing attempt was made, Numancia struck rocks off the Setúbal District near Sesimbra, Portugal, on 17 December 1916 during a gale and was wrecked on the 52nd anniversary of her commissioning. Her wreck was partially scrapped in situ, and the remainder of it was abandoned in 5 to 6 metres (16 to 20 ft) of water.

== Commemoration ==
A replica of Numancia′s officers′ cabin opened to the public on 7 September 1946 at the Pazo de García Flórez in Pontevedra, Spain.
