= Princesa de Asturias =

Princesa de Asturias may refer to:

- Princess of Asturias, a Spanish feminine royal title, the main substantive title used by the heiress apparent, or heiress presumptive to the Spanish Crown, equivalent to the male title Prince of Asturias
- Spanish ship Princesa de Asturias, more than one Spanish Navy ship
- Princesa de Asturias-class cruiser, a class of Spanish Navy armored cruisers
- Copa Princesa de Asturias, an annual second-tier-level national cup competition for Spanish professional basketball teams
- Rally Princesa de Asturias, an annual rally motorsport competition in Asturias, Spain
