= Spanish ship Princesa de Asturias =

Various Spanish Navy ships

Two ships of the Spanish Navy have borne the name Princesa de Asturias, after holders of the Spanish royal title Princess of Asturias:

- Princesa de Asturias, a screw frigate commissioned in 1859, renamed Cartagena and then Asturias in 1868, hulked as a cadet training ship in 1871, decommissioned in 1908, and sold in 1909.
- Princesa de Asturias, a Princesa de Asturias-class armored cruiser in commission from 1903 to 1927.

== See also ==
- Spanish ship Asturias
- Spanish ship Princesa
- Spanish ship Principe de Asturias
