= Spanish ship Asturias =

Various Spanish Navy ships

Two ships of the Spanish Navy have borne the name Asturias, after the province of Asturias in Spain:

- Spanish frigate Princesa de Asturias, a screw frigate commissioned in 1859, renamed Cartagena and then Asturias in 1868, hulked as a cadet training ship in 1871, decommissioned in 1908, and sold in 1909.
- Spanish frigate Asturias, a Baleares-class frigate in commission from 1975 to 2009.

== See also ==
- Spanish ship Princesa de Asturias
- Spanish ship Príncipe de Asturias
