= Hassan Itab =

Pro-Palestinian militant

Hassan Itab (born Mustafa Hassan Abu Omar) is a Palestinian militant and author.

He is known for bombing a British Airways office in Rome on 25 September 1986, injuring 15 people, following the Sabra and Shatila massacre. He claimed allegiance to the Revolutionary Organisation of Socialist Muslims (an alias of the Abu Nidal Organization), according to a report of the United States Department of State Bureau of Public Affairs.

He was imprisoned in Italy, where he wrote his autobiography The Hyena's Den: Story of a Palestinian Boy, published by Sensibili alle foglie. During his imprisonment, Itab thought he was facing the death penalty.

He was the subject of two films, Il viaggio di Hassan (1996), narrated by Maurizio Jannelli and Virginia Onorato, and Di cielo in cielo (1997) directed by Roberto Giannarelli.
