= Andrea Gallo =

Italian presbyter (1928–2013)

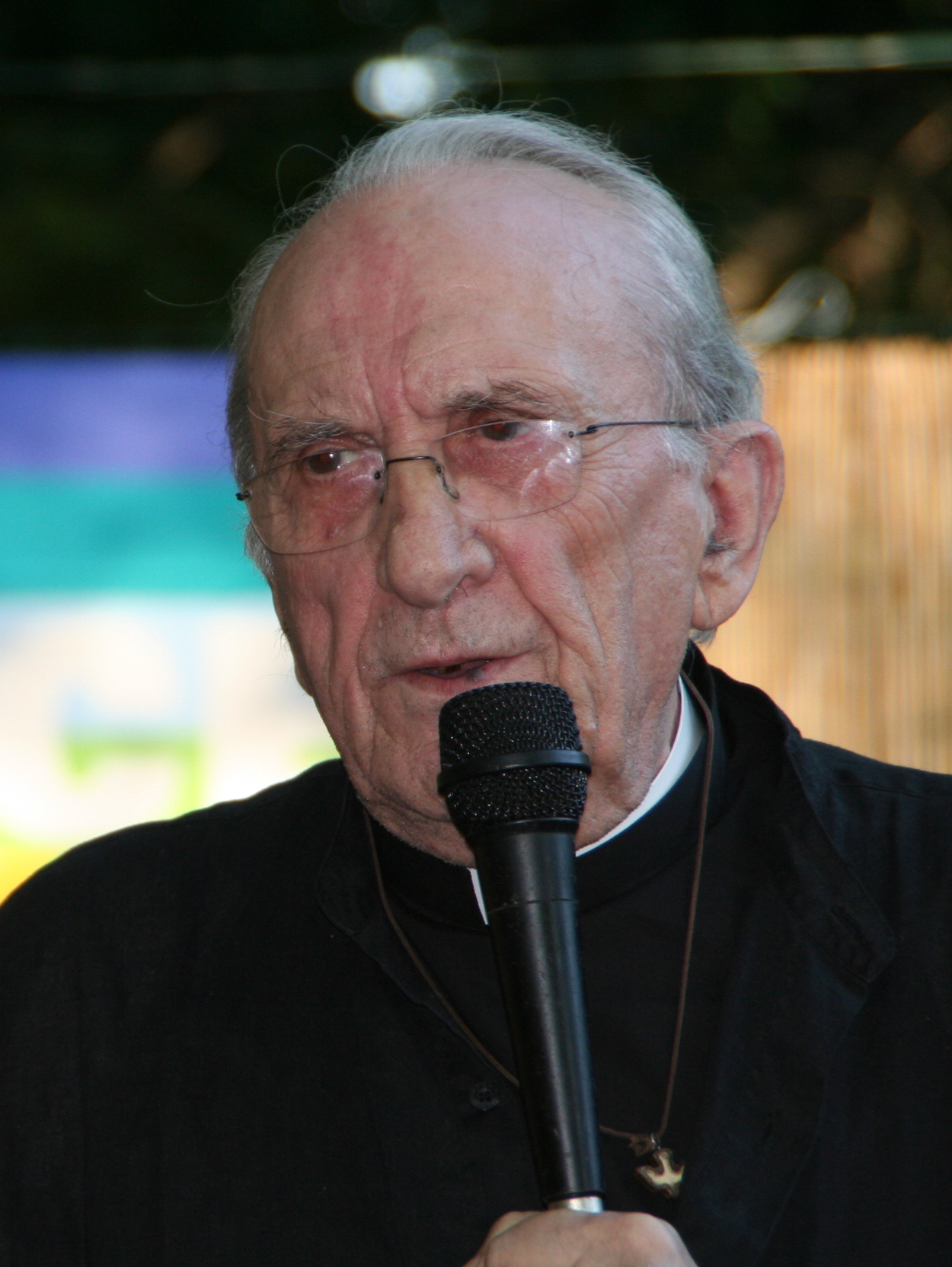
- Gallo in 2007
- Born: Andrea Gallo; 18 July 1928; Genoa, Italy
- Died: 22 May 2013 (aged 84); Genoa, Italy

Don Andrea Gallo (18 July 1928 – 22 May 2013) was an Italian priest. He was the founder and leader of the Community of San Benedetto al Porto. He often called himself a "priest of the sidewalk", referring to his activity of helping poor and needy people.

== Biography ==
Andrea Gallo was born on 18 July 1928 in Genoa. He was drawn to spirituality of the Salesians of John Bosco as a child, and entered their novitiate of Varazze in 1948. In 1953, after studying philosophy in Rome, Gallo was asked to leave Italy for missions, and he was sent to São Paulo, Brazil, where he attended theology courses. Since the Brazilian dictatorship forced him to return to Italy, he went to Ivrea in 1954 to continue his studies and was ordained as a priest on 1 July 1959.

In 1960, Gallo was sent as a chaplain to the training ship Garaventa, trying to introduce a different setting in teaching and to replace the repressive methods with an education based upon trust and freedom. After three years, Gallo was moved to another position, and in 1964, he decided to leave the Salesians and asked his superiors to incardinate him in the Archdiocese of Genoa. After that, Giuseppe Siri, a cardinal and archbishop of Genoa at that time, sent him to Capraia as the chaplain of the prison. Two months later, he was assigned as assistant pastor to the parish of Mount Carmel, where he remained until 1970, when Cardinal Siri moved back to Capraia. In the parish of Mount Carmel, Gallo started to gather young people and adults from all over the city, especially the poor and the marginalized. In the summer of 1970, after a den of hashish was discovered in the same district, Gallo, taking a cue from the fact, he recalled in his homily that there are many other drugs, for example those of language, thanks to which a boy may become "unsuitable for studies" if he is "the son of poor people, or a bombing of helpless people can become action in defense of freedom."

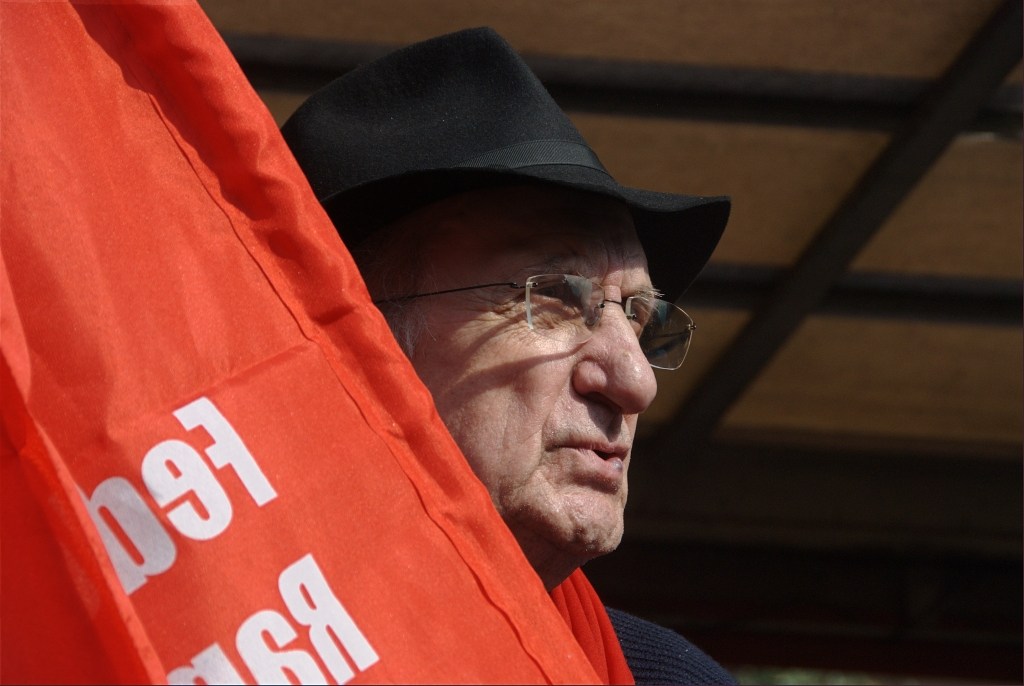
Don Gallo in 2008

Gallo was accused of being a communist, and this led the curia to decide his removal. The measure of the archbishop caused the parish and the town to protest, although the curia did not turn back and ordered Gallo to obey. He refused the assignment to Capraia, believing that there he would be totally and permanently isolated. Some time later, he was welcomed by the parish priest of St. Benedict at Port of Genoa, Don Federico Rebora, and together with a small group he established the Community of San Benedetto al Porto. In an interview in August 2007 at La storia siamo noi ("Preti di strada") on Rai Tre, Gallo said: "My gospels are not four... We have been following for years and years the gospel according to De André, a path that is in an obstinate and contrary direction. And we can confirm it, note it: from diamonds nothing was born, from dung flowers bloom."

Since the foundation of the Community of San Benedetto al Porto, Gallo was committed to pacifism and to the recovery of marginalized people, even advocating for the legalization of soft drugs. In 2006, Gallo was fined for smoking marijuana in the town hall of Genoa to protest against the law on drugs in Italy. He actively supported the No Dal Molin movement of Vicenza against the construction of a new U.S. military base in Padua. In April 2008, Gallo joined the V2-Day organized by Beppe Grillo. On 27 June 2009, he participated to the 2009 Genoa gay pride parade, complaining about the uncertainties of the Catholic Church in respect of homosexuality. An LGBT rights advocate, Gallo was honoured on 15 August 2011 as "Gay Character of the Year" by Gay.it in Torre del Lago. In 2013, he said that the Catholic Church needed an openly gay pope.

A video of Gallo singing the resistance song Bella ciao during mass with a congregation was recorded in 2012. In 2016, Jacobin magazine uploaded the video to social media, receiving hundreds of thousands of views, and occasionally re-uploads the Don Gallo rendition.

Gallo died in Genoa on 22 May 2013 at the age of 84. His death was announced by Domenico Chionetti, spokesman for the Community of San Benedetto al Porto.

== Works ==
- — (1993). San Giovanni Battista di Vinigo e i suoi fioli de jesia.
- — (1995). La chiesa di San Giuliano. Guida storico artistica. Venice: Edizioni studium cattolico veneziano. ISBN 88-85351-20-4.
- — (1995). Poi siamo tutti belli. La Comunità di San Benedetto attraverso le agende di don Andrea Gallo. Rome: Sensibili alle Foglie.
- — (1998). L'inganno droga. Tivoli: Sensibili alle Foglie. ISBN 88-86323-30-1.
- — (2000). Binci, Fabia; Masi, Paolo (eds.). Il fiore pungente. Conversazione con Don Andrea Gallo. Arenzano: O Caroggio. ISBN 978-88-662-0070-3. Reprinted in Milan by Dalai publishers in 2011
- — (2004). Trafficanti di sogni. Lerici: Ippogrifo Liguria.
- — (2005). Angelicamente anarchico. Autobiografia. Milan: Mondadori. ISBN 88-04-53593-8.
- — (2005). Il cantico dei drogati. L'inganno droga nella società delle dipendenze. Dogliani: Sensibili alle Foglie. ISBN 88-86323-98-0.
- —; Traversa, Federico (2007). Io cammino con gli ultimi. Genoa: Chinaski. ISBN 978-88-89966-10-5.
- —; Traversa, Federico (2008). In viaggio con Don Gallo. Genoa: Chinaski. ISBN 978-88-89966-26-6.
- —; Orlando, Simona (2010). Così in terra, come in cielo. Milan: Mondadori. ISBN 978-88-04-59654-7.
- —; Mazzetti, Loris (2010). Sono venuto per servire. Rome: Aliberti. ISBN 978-88-7424-614-4.
- —; Traversa, Federico (2011). E io continuo a camminare con gli ultimi. Genoa: Chinaski. ISBN 978-88-89966-65-5.
- —; Viani, Bruno (2011). Ancora in strada. Un prete da marciapiede. Genoa: De Ferrari. ISBN 978-88-640-5283-0.
- — (2011). Di sana e robusta Costituzione. Rome: Aliberti. ISBN 978-88-7424-789-9.
- — (2011). Il vangelo di un utopista. Reggio Emilia-Rome: Aliberti. ISBN 978-88-7424-820-9.
- — (2011). Se non ora, adesso. [Le donne, i giovani, la liberazione sessuale]. Milan: Chiarelettere. ISBN 978-88-619-0181-0.
- — (2011). Non uccidete il futuro dei giovani. Milan: Dalai. ISBN 978-88-662-0232-5.
- — (2012). La buona novella. Perché non dobbiamo avere paura. Rome: Aliberti. ISBN 978-88-7424-869-8.
- — (2012). Come un cane in Chiesa. Il Vangelo respira solo nelle strade. Milan: Piemme. ISBN 978-88-5662-457-1.
- — (2013). In cammino con Francesco. Milan: Chiarelettere. ISBN 978-88-6190-327-2.
