= Cartagena Iron Drydock =

Floating dry dock in Cartagena, Spain

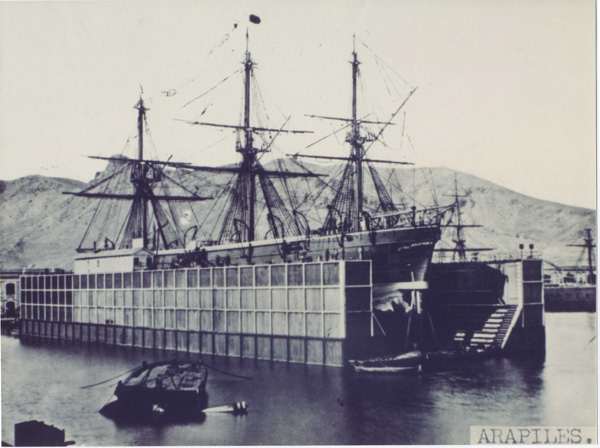
- Spanish ironclad Arapiles in Cartagena Iron Drydock in 1871

History

Spain
- Name: Cartagena Iron Drydock
- Ordered: 1859
- Builder: J. and G. Rennie
- Cost: 150,000 - 160,000 GBP
- Launched: 2 June 1866
- Commissioned: 5 July 1866
- Decommissioned: 1970s?
- Home port: Cartagena, Spain; 37.59622°N 0.99296°W

General characteristics (as completed)
- Displacement: 4,400 ton
- Length: 324 ft (98.8 m)
- Beam: 105 ft (32.0 m)
- Draft: 4 ft 7 in (1.4 m) (empty); 40 ft (12.2 m) (loading); 11 ft 3 in (3.4 m) (loaded)
- Depth of hold: 48 ft (14.6 m) (side); 11 ft 5 in (3.5 m) (pontoon)
- Complement: 16

Cartagena Iron Drydock was said to be the first practical iron floating dry dock. It was built in Britain and reassembled at Cartagena Naval Base in 1866. The dry dock was needed to service the new ironclad fleet that the Spanish Navy acquired in the 1860s. It also served to lift ships so they could be towed onto horizontal slipways. One of its successors still performs this function at the Navantia shipyard of Cartagena.

== Context ==
The traditional method for cleaning or repairing the hull of a ship was careening. It meant that the ship was pulled on its side to gain access to the lower hull. For several reasons, this was impractical for steam-driven vessels. The alternative was the use of graving docks, which were built in England and France from the 17th century.

In many locations, the construction of a graving dock was difficult. From the early nineteenth century, big steam-powered floating dry docks made of wood provided an alternative. There were two principal types: the sectional dock, and the balance dock. The balance dock was invented in America by John S. Gilbert. Amsterdam Wooden Drydock I, built in 1842 was an example of his type of balance dry docks.

In 1858, Mr. Gilbert assisted in building a wooden balance dry dock for the new Austrian naval base at Pola (Pula). It was built in Venice, where it was observed by G. B. Rennie of the firm J. and G. Rennie. Rennie thought that it would make more sense to build iron balance docks.

== Design ==
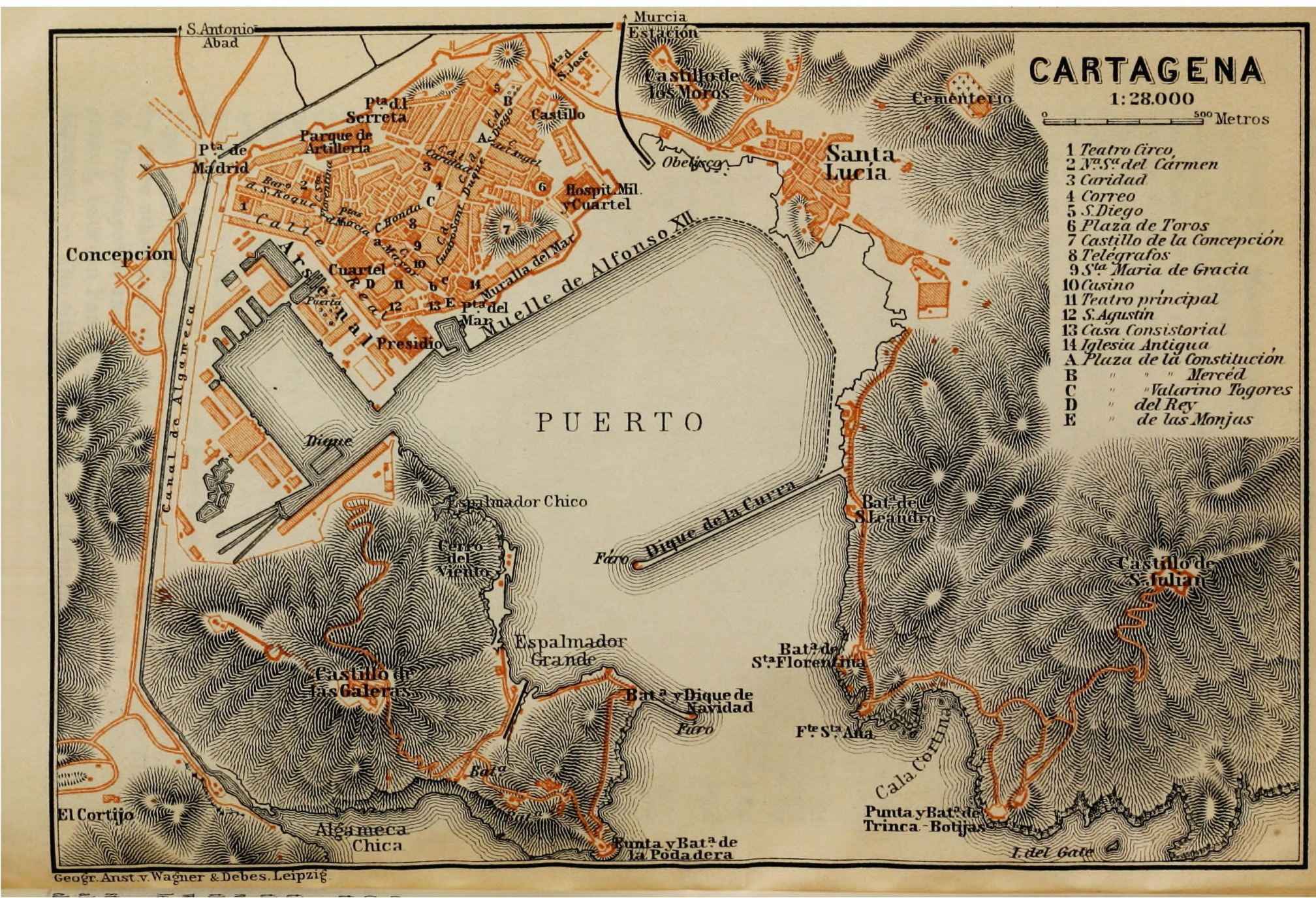
On the left the dock ('Dique') and three slipways.

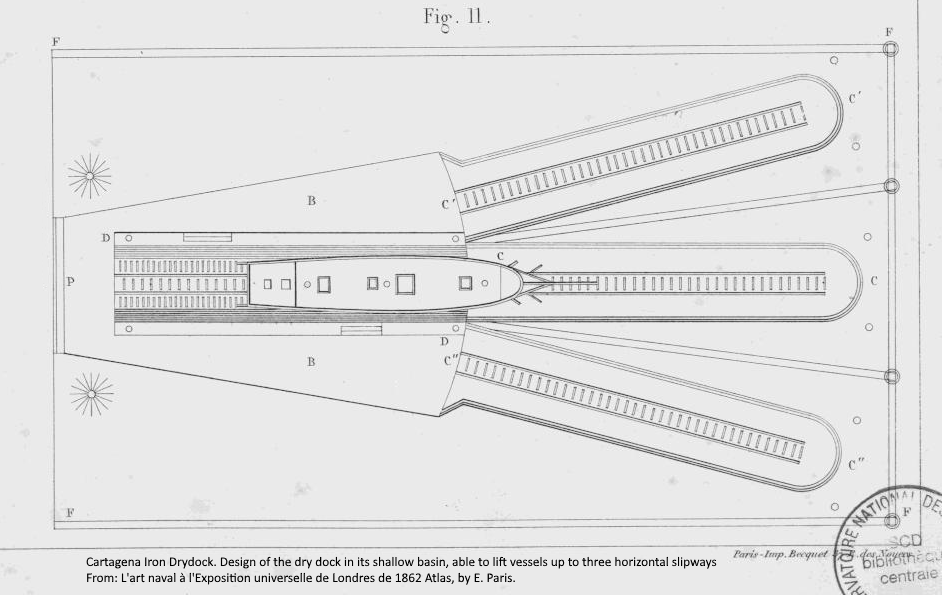
The dry dock, the basin, and the three horizontal slipways

In 1859, the Spanish government decided to acquire a new fleet of ironclad warships. These required new dry dock facilities, but the government faced many difficulties when it tried to construct graving docks. General Quesada, Director of Engineers, then contacted J. and G. Rennie via the Spanish Naval Commission in London. He wanted to inquire about the construction of a floating dry dock for the naval base at Cartagena. It was to have a lifting capacity of 5,000 to 6,000 tons. Which related to the weight of the projected ironclads Numancia, Vitoria, and other vessels. The design for Cartagena Iron Drydock is said to have been made in 1862.

As George B. Rennie himself admitted, the design for Cartagena Iron Drydock was 'in principal somewhat similar' to Gilbert's Pola dock. However, as it was made of iron instead of wood some important modifications were required. In a wooden dock, the buoyancy of the massive wooden raft made it necessary to force water into the side chambers to lower it enough for taking a vessel in (or to use ballast). In an iron dock, measures were necessary to prevent the dock from sinking further after water had been let into the lower chambers. For this, the upper parts of the side walls of the Cartagena dock were divided into compartments. These formed air-tight floats that would always keep the side walls 6-8 feet above the surrounding water.

Rennie called the 'pontoon' of the dry dock its basement. It had to be able to withstand the enormous pressure that the keel of a lifted vessel would exert on its center line. This was expected to be 1.32 ton per square inch for the Numancia. Therefore, the shell of this basement was made of 5/8 inch iron plates. In the center, where the keel of a lifted vessel would be, the plates were 5/4 inch thick over a breadth of 6 feet. Of course the pontoon also had a very strong structure on the inside.

Another design choice was about how the dry dock was docked itself itself. One of the solutions for this is to float the dock into a shallow excavation. The entrance is then closed up by a dam and the remaining water pumped out. The system used at Cartagena was similar to this.

At the 1862 International Exhibition in London, ironclad warships were still very new. Solutions to dock these drew quite some attention as many wished to evade the high cost of new stone graving docks. The design (model?) of Rennie's Cartagena Iron Drydock was seen as one of the most important exhibits in this field. It drew attention due to its size, but also because it was part of a plan to use it in combination with building three new horizontal slipways at Cartagena. By using hydraulic power for horizontal movement, this would make it possible to simultaneously have six major warships under repair.

== Technical characteristics ==
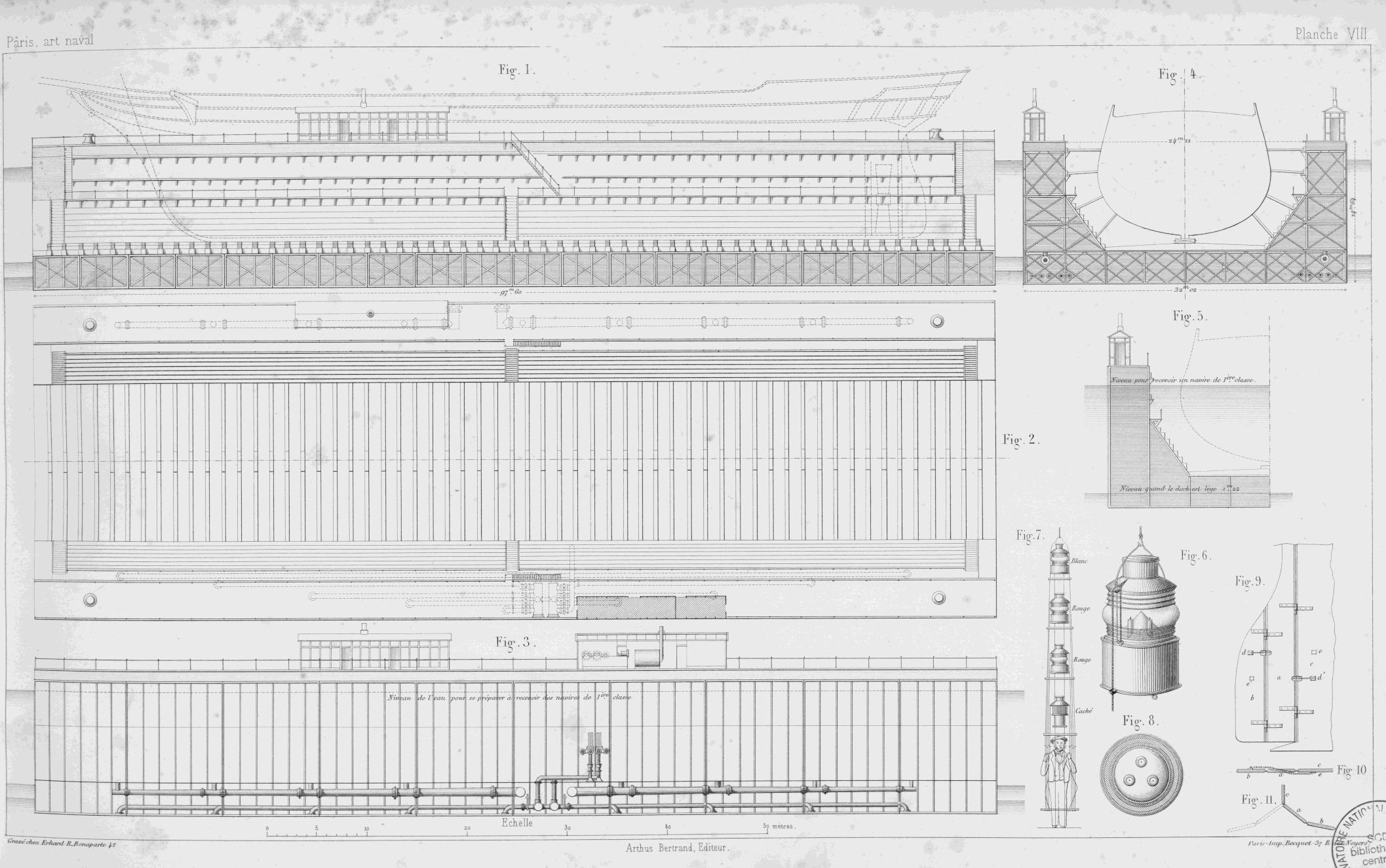
Design drawing of Cartagena Iron Drydock

Cartagena Iron Drydock was 324 ft (98.8 m) long with a beam of 105 ft (32.0 m). It was 48 ft (14.6 m) high. The basement (or pontoon) was 324 by 105 feet (99 by 32 m) with a depth of hold of 11 ft 5 in (3.5 m). It was made of 5/8-inch (16 mm) boiler plate iron. It was longitudinally divided into two parts by a 5/8-inch plate iron bulkhead. Each of these two parts was again subdivided by transverse bulkheads into ten equal compartments. These twenty watertight compartments each had another bulkhead parallel to the center one. These bulkheads were perforated, so they enabled the water level to be on the same level in each compartment, but not to rush from side to side. The compartments were held together by a mass of girders, frames, and T-irons.

The side walls ran the whole length of the pontoon, but were not in communication with it. They were divided into transverse bulkheads similar to those in the pontoon. Horizontal bulkheads divided the sides into two parts. The upper compartments were permanent air chambers. The lower ones were only filled with water when a large ship had to enter the dock. The lower part also had the angle-iron steps that served as altars for the shores that supported a docking vessel. The thickness of the side walls ran from 9/16 in (14 mm) at the bottom to 3/8 in (9.5 mm) at the top.

The suitability of the dock for servicing vessels depended on the inner measurements. As regards length, a ship that stuck out over the ends of a dry dock was a common sight. Inside breadth determined the maximum beam of ships that could enter. The breadth of entrance of Cartagena Iron Drydock was 79 ft (24.1 m). When maximally submerged, the depth of the dock at H.W.O.S. was given as 29 ft 5 in (9.0 m) above the sill (deck) and 26 ft (7.9 m) above the blocks.

Each side of the dock had separate pumping machinery. This consisted of a pair of horizontal steam engines that worked two pairs of lift pumps directly below them. These drew water from a common pipe that communicated with all the chambers. At the end of these pipes were also the four inlet sluices of 40.5-inch (1,030 mm) diameter, which let water in for lowering the dock. Smaller inlets communicated to each chamber. This allowed to control the water level in each chamber. Which made it possible to precisely level the dock. The engines made 60 rpm at full speed. They had cylinders of 14-inch (360 mm) diameter, with a stroke of 18 inches (460 mm). The pumps had a diameter of 20 inches (510 mm) with a stroke of 2 feet 9 inches (0.84 m).

To prevent a ship from falling over, there were two rows of altars for horizontal shores on the upper half of the sides. On the lower half of the sides, there were eight rows of shoring steps. At the floor of the dock, there were nine movable bilge blocks, which were drawn inwards towards the keel by chains that were in communication with the upper deck. This prevented the keel of the docked vessel from sliding sidewards. Finally, the keel of the docked vessel rested on keel blocks that were the same as those found in graving docks. These were about five feet apart, above the transverse girders. There were eight powerful capstans, which also allowed to move the dock over short distances.

The staff of the dock consisted of one chief engineer, one master boiler maker, four assistant engineers, four firemen, four valvemen, one clerk, and one storekeeper.

The cost of the dry dock itself was estimated between 150,000 and 160,000 GBP.

== Construction ==
The drydock in mid-1866

Numancia in the drydock in 1868

The drydock in 1889

Vizcaya on the renovated dry dock, 1896

At Cartagena, the arsenal basin measured about 1,120 by 1,800 feet, and was excavated to a depth of 30-40 feet. At the place where the dry dock was finally moored, this was increased to 50 feet. At its south west corner, there were some old timber ponds which were no longer required.

It was decided to build a shallow basin or dock receiver and three slipways at the site of the timber ponds. The basin was 16 feet 9 inches (5.11 m) deep from the quay wall. The entrance in the east was 120 feet 9 inches (36.80 m) wide at the bottom and 126 feet (38 m) wide at the top and was 106 feet (32 m) long. It would be closed with an iron ship caisson.

The shallow basin was 382 feet (116 m) long on the northern side and 345 feet (105 m) on the southern side. At its western end, it had a curvature of 320 feet (98 m) radius with a chord of 200 feet (61 m). This allowed to turn the dry dock to one of three horizontal slipways that were 725 feet (221 m) long and 45 feet (14 m) wide. The idea was that vessels would be raised by the floating dock and then pulled onto the slipways by hydraulic power, and vice versa. This structure is basically still in place today.

The ship caisson that closed the basin was also made by Rennie. It looked like a ship and was similar to the one Rennie had made for the base at Pola. It measured 126 by 18 feet (38.4 by 5.5 m).

Construction of the dry dock itself took 18 months in England. When finished, it had been completely assembled. It was then disassembled again and sent to Spain.

In Spain it took quite some time to re-assemble the dock and to test each part. In 1862 assembly started in Cartagena.

On 2 June 1866, water was let into the receiving basin, and the dock was floated / launched. Draft was then found to be 4 ft 7 in (1.4 m). Displacement was 4,400 tons. The dock was then moved into the arsenal basin.

== Service ==
In the arsenal basin, the dock started its regular service. After opening the valves for the first time, it was submerged to 37 ft (11.3 m). On 5 July 1866, the dock lifted its first vessel. It gave so much confidence that the engineer soon progressed to lifting heavier vessels.

On 22 July 1866, the magazine El Museo Universal published an image of the dock lifting a screw warship. However, according to a list provided by Rennie, the dock lifted the dredger Diligente on 5 July, and let if off on 1 August 1866. It could therefore very well be that the image is based on a photo of the dock combined with an image of the warship.

On 27 April 1868, the dry dock lifted the Numancia of 5,600 tons. It stayed on the dock until 15 July. In 1871 G. B. Rennie claimed that up to that time, no other floating dock had lifted a vessel as big as the Numancia. He also claimed that Cartagena Iron Drydock was the first practical example of an iron floating dock.

During the 1873 Cantonal Rebellion, Cartagena was the center of the rebels. The rebellion ended with a siege that lasted into 1874. It led to enormous destruction at the naval base. However, the drydock survived in a good condition.

In early 1891, the Minister of the Navy Beránger Ruiz de Apodaca faced heavy criticism about the Cartagena base in the Senate of Spain. With regard to the dry dock, he explained that it was getting docked itself. Once this was done, it would be able to serve for another 30 years.

In the mid 1890s, some changes were made to the dry dock. In 1896, it was then able to lift the armored cruiser Vizcaya of 6,890 t.

== The end ==
Cartagena Iron Drydock was a very solid structure. However, even while it was being constructed, ships were rapidly becoming longer. In mid 1896, the Spanish government started construction of a new graving dock in Cartagena. This new dock was finished in 1903. It was 430 ft (131.1 m) long on the blocks and 492 ft (150.0 m) long overall. Its entrance was 90 ft (27.4 m) wide.

The new graving dock did not improve the existing construction shipyard in Cartagena. Therefore, a new dry dock was ordered for Cartagena based on the dimensions of the light cruiser Reina Victoria Eugenia and those of the shipyard basin. The new dry dock was 393 ft 4 in (119.9 m) long, but could be extended to 462 ft 7 in (141 m). It was known as Dique Flotante de 6.500 toneladas de Cartagena or Cartagena floating drydock of 6,500 t. It was tested in May 1925, and accepted into service in December 1925.

It is not immediately clear when Cartagena Iron Drydock was broken up. Side by side, it was still mentioned in the 1969 edition of Lloyd's Register of Shipping. It was said to lift 4,500 tons and to have been repaired in the 1940s.
