= Princesa (film) =

2001 film by Henrique Goldman

- Directed by: Henrique Goldman
- Written by: Ellis Freeman; Henrique Goldman
- Produced by: Rebecca O'Brien
- Starring: Ingrid de Souza; Cesare Bocci
- Cinematography: Guillermo Escalon
- Edited by: Kerry Kohler
- Music by: Giovanni Venosta
- Distributed by: BIM Distribuzione
- Release dates: 23 January 2001 (Sundance); 1 June 2001
- Running time: 96 minutes
- Countries: Italy; Spain
- Languages: Italian; Portuguese

Princesa is a 2001 film directed by Henrique Goldman that tells the story of a transsexual woman, Fernanda, who travels to Milan and works as a prostitute to finance her sex reassignment surgery. The film was inspired by a book of the same name written by Maurizio Janelli and Fernanda Farias de Albuquerque.

Unlike in real life, Fernanda Farias de Albuquerque in the film is able to overcome her hardships, whereas in real life de Albuquerque died by suicide in 2000 after being deported to her native Brazil. The film did not achieve initial success, but won an award for the best foreign film in the Outfest festival in Los Angeles.

== Cast ==
- Ingrid de Souza as Fernanda
- Cesare Bocci as Gianni
- Lulu Pecorari as Karin
- Mauro Pirovano as Fabrizio
- Biba Lerhue as Charlo
- Sonia Morgan as Fofao
- Alessandra Acciai as Lidia
- Egidio Cardillo as Cliente
