= Spanish ship Princesa =

A number of ships of the Spanish Navy have borne the name Princesa:

- Spanish ship Princesa (1730), a 70-gun third-rate ship of the line, captured by HMS Orford in 1740 and taken into service as HMS Princess.
- Spanish ship Princesa (1750), a 70-gun third-rate ship of the line, captured by the Royal Navy during the Battle of Cape St. Vincent in 1780 and taken into service as HMS Princessa.
- La Princesa (1778), a Spanish frigate or corvette.
- Princesa (1796), a 16-gun ship, captured by HMS Seahorse.

== See also ==
- Princesa (disambiguation)
