= Sensibili alle foglie =

Sensibili alle foglie (English: Sensitive to Pages (Note: An Italian play on words; foglie meaning leaves or pages and follie meaning folly or madness)) is a publishing co-operative.

The group was founded by Renato Curcio in 1990, after meeting with Stefano Petrelli and Nicola Valentino in prison. All three men were imprisoned members of the Red Brigades militant group (Curcio was the leader of the group).

The publishing house dealt with themes of criminality, and the history of Italian terrorism. They had a specific focus on publishing content from migrant writers in prison on controversial topics. Sensibili alle foglie published Fernanda Farias de Albuquerque's 1994 autobiography Princesa, which deals with her identity as a Brazilian migrant trans woman as well as a sex worker. Hassan Itab's La tana della iena (1991; "The Hyena's Den"), which was an autobiography of his life as a Palestinian militant integrating into Italian society. The co-operative also worked with social campaigner Don Luigi Di Liegro and published his work on migration.
