= Lovers Film Festival - Torino LGBTQI Visions =

Italian LGBT+ film festival

Lovers Film Festival
- Location: Turin, Italy
- Founded: 1986; 39 years ago
- Founded by: Giovanni Minerba; Ottavio Mai
- Hosted by: National Museum of Cinema
- Festival date: April

Lovers Film Festival – Torino LGBTQI Visions, formerly known as Torino Gay & Lesbian Film Festival and From Sodom to Hollywood, is a film festival held annual in the city of Turin, Italy. The festival presents a selection of films with LGBTQI themes. Founded in 1986, it is the oldest festival of its kind in Europe and the third in the world.

Since 2006 the Festival has been organized by the Maria Adriana Prolo Foundation – National Museum of Cinema and operates out of the Cinema Massimo theatre in the centre of the city. The current director of the festival is Italian activist and actress, Vladimir Luxuria.

== History ==
The festival was founded by filmmakers Giovanni Minerba and Ottavio Mario Mai who in 1981 presented their first film "Dalla vita di Piero", receiving critical acclaim at the Turin Youth Cinema Festival. The film was unique for its time in that its protagonist did not fit the stereotype of homosexuals featured in mainstream cinema who were typically marginalized or stigmatized caricatures. The praise it received inspired the idea of an international film festival honouring pictures with gay themes. What started in 1986 as a modest review titled "From Sodom to Hollywood", transformed into a government sponsored festival in 1989.

The 39th Lovers Film Festival took place from April 16 to 21, 2024. In 2025 the festival will celebrate its fortieth anniversary.

== See also ==
Torino Film Festival
