= Spanish frigate Princesa de Asturias =

Spanish Navy screw frigate of 1859–1908

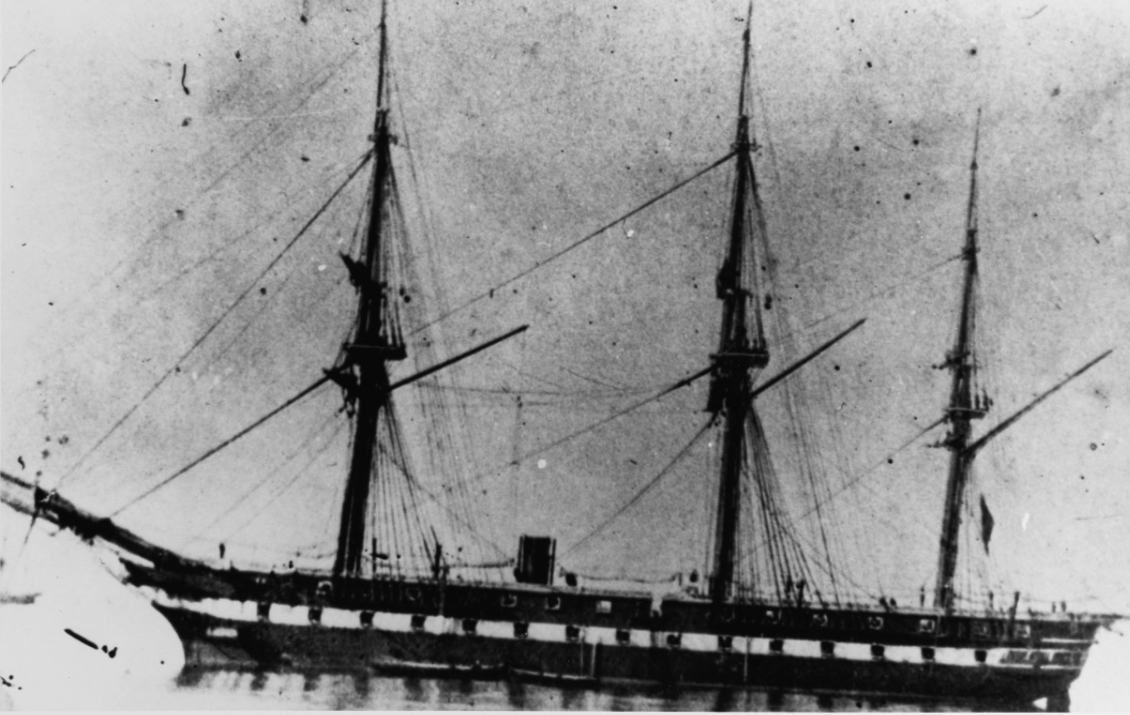

History

Armada Española Ensign First Spanish Republic
- Name: Princesa de Asturias
- Namesake: Infanta Isabel, Countess of Girgenti (1851–1931), Princess of Asturias (1851–1857)
- Ordered: 23 June 1852 (authorized as sailing frigate); 8 September 1852 or 3 February 1854 (reauthorized as screw frigate) (see text)
- Builder: Arsenal de La Carraca, San Fernando, Spain
- Cost: 4,792,243 pesetas
- Laid down: 13 May 1853
- Launched: 17 November 1857
- Commissioned: 1 November or 14 December 1859 (see text)
- Renamed: Cartagena 7 October 1868
- Namesake: Cartagena, Spain
- Renamed: Asturias 13 October 1868
- Namesake: Asturias, Spain
- Reclassified: Floating jetty 1886
- Decommissioned: 1908
- Fate: Hulked 1870; Sold 1909; Auctioned for use as firewood 12 March 1914

General characteristics
- Type: Screw frigate
- Displacement: 2,800 t (2,800 long tons) (as built); 1,576 t (1,551 long tons) (1871)
- Length: 66 m (216 ft 6 in)
- Beam: 15 m (49 ft 3 in)
- Height: 7 m (23 ft 0 in)
- Draft: 6.30 m (20 ft 8 in)
- Installed power: 360 hp (268 kW) (nominal); 2,400 ihp (1,790 kW) (indicated)
- Propulsion: One John Penn and Sons steam engine, four boilers,one shaft; 230 or 460 tons coal (see text)
- Sail plan: 46 sails, 2,400 m^{2} (25,833 sq ft)
- Speed: 8 knots (15 km/h; 9.2 mph)
- Endurance: 27 days (see text)
- Complement: 437
- Armament: As built: 10 x 68-pounder (31 kg) 200 mm (7.9 in) smoothbore guns; 26 x 32-pounder (14.5 kg) 160 mm (6.3 in) guns; 2 x 165 mm (6.5 in) iron guns; 5 x bronze guns (for use in boats); 1868: 11 x 68-pounder (31 kg) 200 mm (7.9 in) smoothbore guns; 18 x 160 mm (6.3 in) guns; 1871: Most guns removed; ca. 1900; 1 x 80 mm (3.1 in) Krupp gun; 1 x 70 mm (2.8 in) Hontoria gun; 1 x 47 mm (1.9 in) Škoda gun; 1 x 42 mm (1.7 in) Nordenfelt gun; 1 x 42 mm (1.7 in) Sarmiento gun; 1 x 37 mm (1.5 in) Maxim revolver; 1 x 37 mm (1.5 in) Hotchkiss gun; 1 x 11 mm (0.433 in) Nordenfelt gun
- Notes: Immobile cadet training ship from 1871

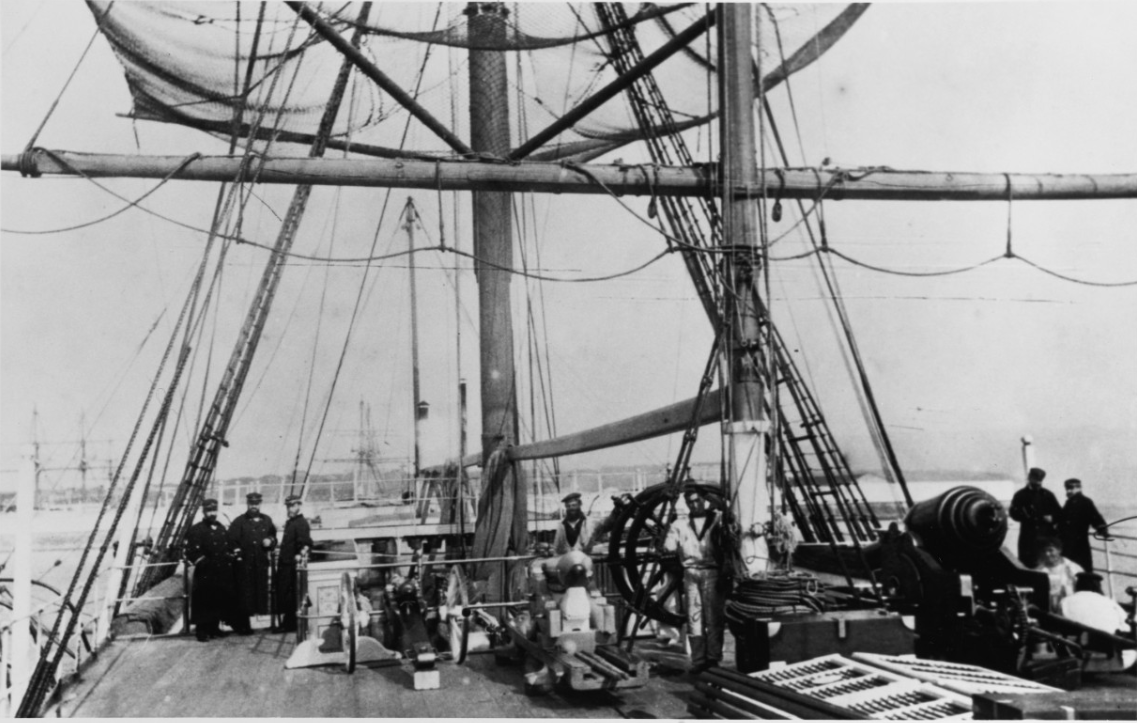
Princesa de Asturias's quarterdeck.

Princesa de Asturias was a Spanish Navy screw frigate commissioned in 1859. She took part in the Hispano–Moroccan War of 1859–1860 and the mulitnational intervention in Mexico of 1861–1862, and the Dominican Restoration War of 1863–1865. In 1868, after the Glorious Revolution, she was renamed Cartagena, then six days later was renamed Asturias. From 1871, she was hulked as an immobile cadet training ship and headquarters of the Colegio Naval Militar (Naval Military College). After serving as such until 1906, she was decommissioned in 1908.

== Characteristics ==
Princesa de Asturias was a screw frigate with a wooden hull. She had three masts and a bowsprit. She displaced 2,800 tons. She was 66 metres (216 ft 6 in) long and was 15 metres (49 ft 3 in) in beam, 7 metres (23 ft 0 in) in height, and 6.30 metres (20 ft 8 in) in draft. She was rigged to carry up to 46 sails with a total area of 2,400 square metres (25,833 sq ft) and had a John Penn and Sons steam engine rated at a nominal 360 horsepower (268 kW) which, with her four boilers, gave her 2,400 indicated horsepower (1,790 kW). Sources disagree on her maximum speed, one claiming that she was intended to reach a maximum of 11 knots (20 km/h; 13 mph) but never exceeded 8 knots (15 km/h; 9.2 mph), another that she could reach 9.5 knots (17.6 km/h; 10.9 mph) under steam alone and 10.5 knots (19.4 km/h; 12.1 mph) under combined steam and sail. She could carry up to 230 tons of coal, according to one source, or up to 460 tons according to another. Her armament consisted of ten 68-pounder (31 kg) 200-millimetre (7.9 in) smoothbore guns, twenty-six 32-pounder (14.5 kg) 160-millimetre (6.3 in) guns, and five bronze guns for disembarkation and use in her boats; according to one source, she also had two 165-millimetre (6.5 in) "iron guns." She had a crew of 437 men. She had 37 cisterns for drinking water which, based on am assumed consumption of four Castilian cuartillos (slightly over two liters) per man per day and 552 men aboard, gave her an endurance of 27 days.

== Construction and commissioning ==
Princesa de Asturias's construction as a 50-gun sailing frigate was authorized on 23 June 1852. According to one source, thus was cancelled on 8 September 1852 and her construction as a screw frigate was authorized instead. Her keel was laid at the Arsenal de La Carraca in San Fernando, Spain, on 13 May 1853, and another sources claims that she was not re-authorized as a screw frigate until a Royal Order to that effect was promulgated on 3 February 1854. Conversion of the 86-gun ship of the line Rey Don Francisco de Asís to steam power was canceled, and the steam engine originally intended for Rey Don Francisco de Asis was diverted to Princesa de Asturias instead. Princesa de Asturias′s construction as a screw frigate required the extension of her sternpost and dismantling some of her frames to allow the installation of her engine and boilers. Technical challenges and difficulty in procuring materials resulted in a lengthy construction process, but she was launched on 17 November 1857, and completed late in the autumn of 1859. According to one source, she was commissioned on 1 November 1859; according to another, she first put to sea on 1 November, but did not conduct her sea trials until 13 December and was not commissioned until 14 December 1859. Her construction cost was 4,792,243 pesetas.

== Service history ==
=== 1859–1870 ===
Shortly before Princesa de Asturias entered service, Spain became involved in the Hispano–Moroccan War. Near the end of 1859, she proceeded to Algeciras to join a Spanish Navy squadron under the command of Joaquín Gutierrez de Rubalcava assembling for operations off Morocco. In January 1860 the squadron supported the Spanish Army with a bombardment of the fortresses of Tétouan. She became squadron flagship on 24 February 1860 and took part in the transportation of 35,000 soldiers to Ceuta, a blockade of the Moroccan coast, and a bombardment of Martil (known to the Spanish as Río Martin). She also participated in bombardments of Larache on 25 February and Asilah (known to the Spanish as Arcila) on 26 February 1860. During the bombardments, she was hit 20 times and her crew suffered eight casualties. After the end of hostilities, she escorted the British merchant ship Earl of Londsdale with the Spanish steamer Francisco de Asís, which brought to Gibraltar an indemnity Sultan Muhammad IV agreed to pay as part of the peace settlement.

Princesa de Asturias soon deployed to the Caribbean and was assigned to the naval base at Havana in the Captaincy General of Cuba. At the beginning of July 1860, she participated as part of a squadron under the overall command of Gutierrez de Rubalcava — which also included the screw frigates Berenguela and Reina Blanca, the paddle gunboats Francisco de Asís and Isabel la Católica, and the transport steamer Velasco — in a naval demonstration off Port-au-Prince, Haiti, to put pressure on the government of Haiti to halt aggressive actions against the neighboring First Dominican Republic. In 1861, General Pedro Santana, the president of the First Dominican Republic, who had repeatedly requested the protection of the Spanish government, unilaterally proclaimed Spanish sovereignty over his country out of fear that the United States would annex it. Spain annexed the country in March 1861, and Captain-General of Cuba Francisco Serrano sent a division under Gutierrez de Rubalcava's command which included Princesa de Asturias to various ports in Santo Domingo where the ships disembarked 3,000 Spanish Army soldiers and 2,000 Spanish Navy sailors and men of the Spanish Marine Infantry in May and June 1861. After the government of Haiti threatened to declare war on Spain, the ships again demonstrated off Port-au-Prince to discourage Haiti from taking advantage of the situation in Santo Domingo.

Later in 1861 a break in relations between Spain and Mexico occurred when Spain insisted on the settlement of damage claims it had made. A Spanish squadron under Gutierrez de Rubalcava's command which included Princesa de Asturias departed Havana to transport a landing force under the command of General Juan Prim to Veracruz as part of a mulitnational intervention in Mexico. The ships and landing force seized Veracruz on 14 December 1861, and French and British forces arrived in January 1862. Spanish and British forces withdrew from Mexico in April 1862 when it became apparent that France intended to seize control of Mexico, and Princesa de Asturias returned to Cuba.

Princesa de Asturias returned to Spain in 1862 and began an assignment to the Training Squadron, which was under the overall command of Contralmirante (Counter Admiral) Luis Hernández Pinzón y Alvarez. On 9 June 1862, the squadron conducted maneuvers in the presence of Minister of the Navy Teniente general (Lieutenant General) Juan Zavala de la Puente, a future prime minister of Spain. After the squadron was dissolved on 12 June, Princesa de Asturias proceeded to Cádiz. There the ministers of the former First Dominican Republic boarded her, and she transported them to Santo Domingo. She then proceeded to Cuba and conducted operations in Santo Domingo before returning to Spain.

During a naval review at Alicante, Queen Isabella II and King Francisco transferred from the paddle gunboat General Liniers to Princesa de Asturias on 12 September 1862. As part of a squadron that also included General Liniers, the 86-gun ship of the line Rey Don Francisco de Asís, the corvette Mazarredo, the paddle gunboats Lepanto and Isabel II, and the transport steamers San Quintín, General Álava, and San Francisco de Borja, Princesa de Asturias then made a voyage with the royal couple aboard to Palma de Mallorca on Mallorca in the Balearic Islands and to Barcelona, which the ships reached on 21 September 1862.

Princesa de Asturias was at Havana when Capitán de navío (Ship-of-the-Line Captain) Casto Méndez Núñez, a future admiral, became her commanding officer on 22 January 1864. She got underway on 23 January for Santo Domingo, where she took part in a blockade of Manzanillo on the coast of Monte Cristi Province during the Dominican Restoration War. Méndez Núñez relinquished command on 9 August 1864. After Isabel la Católica relieved her at Havana, Princesa e Asturias returned to Spain on 17 November 1865. She then began repairs that were completed in March 1866. On 23 May 1866, the British schooner Caudor sank after colliding with Princesa de Asturias at Barcelona. On 7 August 1867, Princesa de Asturias was lifted by Cartagena Iron Drydock. As she was floated out on 13 August, this was probably about regular maintenance.

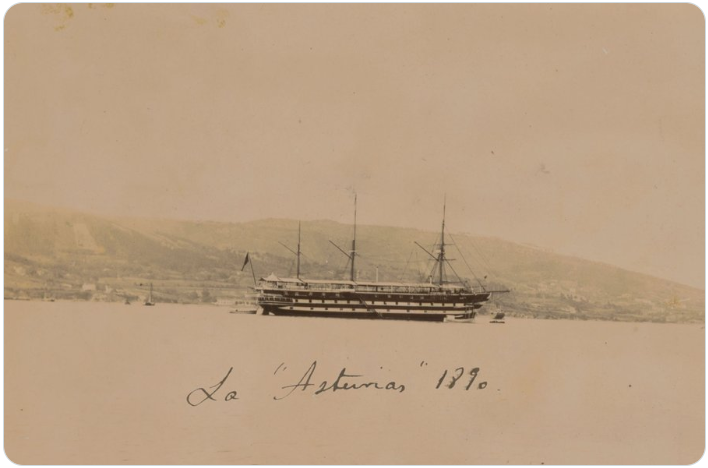
Princesa de Asturias in 1870.

Princesa de Asturias was at Almería when the Glorious Revolution broke out on 19 September 1868. Her commanding officer immediately joined the uprising, which ended on 27 September and resulted in the deposition of Isabella II and the proclamation of a provisional government. Under the new government, some Spanish Navy ships underwent name changes. Princesa de Asturias was renamed Cartagena on 7 October 1868, then by an order of 13 October1868 was renamed Asturias. Asturias also underwent alterations to her armament, from which she emerged with ten 200-millimetre (7.9 in) guns and eighteen 160-millimetre (6.3 in) guns in her battery and one 200-millimetre (7.9 in) swivel gun on her bow. In 1869 she began an assignment to the Mediterranean Squadron.

In a report dated 19 April 1870, Asturias′s commanding officer described her seaworthiness as excellent, with her rigging and small boats in good condition and her bottom lined and nailed with copper. However he also noted that her bottom was very dirty,making navigation difficult, that the poor condition of her boilers prevented her from making more than 5 knots (9.3 km/h; 5.8 mph) under steam, and that she had accumulated 15 inches (38 cm) of water in her bilge in 24 hours, which he speculated came from boiler spills.

=== Cadet training ship ===
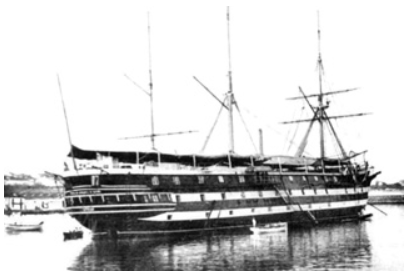
Asturias as a training hulk housing the Colegio Naval Militar between 1871 and 1906.

A decree of 10 September 1869 established the Colegio Naval Militar (Naval Military College), and in 1870 Asturias entered the Arsenal de Ferrol at Ferrol, Spain, to undergo conversion into the college's headquarters as an immobile cadet training ship. Her propulsion plant and most of her rigging and guns were removed and. among other things, her accommodations were expanded to house officer cadets. she retained her three masts and some of their yards. She emerged from the conversion with a reduced displacement of 1,576 tons and her hull painted black with two stripes, giving her the appearance of a two-deck ship, although as a frigate she had only one gun deck.

Hulked at Ferrol, Asturias began her new duties on 1 April 1871. Her first director was Capitán de navío (Ship-of-the-Line Captain) Victoriano Sánchez Barcáiztegui, and her instructional staff consisted of 15 tenientes de navío (ship-of-the-line lieutenants). She could accommodate up to 100 cadets at a time. In 1886 she was reclassified as a floating jetty, although she continued to serve as a training ship until 1906. By around 1900 her armament had become one 80-millimetre (3.1 in) Krupp gun, one 70-millimetre (2.8 in) Hontoria gun, one 47-millimetre (1.9 in) Škoda gun, one 42-millimetre (1.7 in) Nordenfelt gun, one 42-millimetre (1.7 in) Sarmiento gun, one 37-millimetre (1.5 in) Maxim revolver, one 37-millimetre (1.5 in) Hotchkiss gun, and one 11-millimetre (0.433 in) Nordenfelt gun.

== Final disposition ==
Asturias was decommissioned in 1908 when the Spanish Navy decided to move the Naval Military College to San Fernando. She was sold for scrapping in 1909. On 12 March 1914 her hulk was auctioned off for use as firewood.
