= Miguel Lobo y Malagamba =

Spanish naval officer

Don Miguel Lobo y Malagamba
- Posthumous portrait of Miguel Lobo y Malagamba by Salvador Martínez Cubells (1845–1914), ca. 1881 (Collection of the Museo Naval)
- Born: Miguel Ignacio Lobo y Malagamba; 26 November 1821; San Fernando, Spain
- Died: 5 April 1876 (aged 54); Paris, France
- Burial place: Panteón de Marinos Ilustres, San Fernando, Spain; 36°28′47″N 006°11′37″W
- Military career
- Allegiance: Kingdom of Spain
- Service: Spanish Navy
- Service years: 1835–1876
- Rank: Contralmirante (Counter admiral)
- Commands: Magallanes; Patriota; Mazarredo; Light forces in Hispano-Moroccan War; South American Squadron; Captain General of Ferrol Department; Mediterranean Squadron; Captain General of Cartagena Department
- Conflicts: First Carlist War; Revolution of Maria da Fonte; Spanish-Moro Conflict; Hispano-Moroccan War; Battle of Castillejos; Chincha Islands War; Bombardment of Valparaíso; Battle of Callao; Cantonal Rebellion; Battle of Portmán
- Awards: Laureate Cross of Saint Ferdinand First Class

Miguel Ignacio Lobo y Malagamba (26 November 1821 – 5 April 1876) was a Spanish Navy officer. He serevd as chief of staff of the Pacific Squadron during the Chincha Islands War and took part in the Battle of Callao in 1866, assuming command of the squadron for the remainder of the battle after the squadron commander, Contralmirante (Counter Admiral) Casto Méndez Núñez was wounded. Lobo also reached the rank of contralmirante (counter admiral), and in 1873 he commanded the government squadron in the Battle of Portmán during the Cantonal Rebellion. He was elected to the Congress of Deputies shortly before his death, but was too ill to take office.

== Biography ==
=== Early life ===
Lobo was born in San Fernando, Spain, on 26 November 1821, the son of Spanish Navy Capitán de navío (Ship-of-the-Line Captain) Manuel Lobo y Campo and Juana Malagamba Guarderas. After completing his elementary school studies, he passed the naval entrance examination on 26 May 1835.

=== Naval career ===
==== 1835–1863 ====
Lobo's first assignment was to the brig Jasón, which was conducting operations as part of the Northern Naval Forces along the northern coast of Spain during the First Carlist War. With Lobo aboard, Jasón took part in operations at Pasajes and in the Bilbao estuary, transported troops from San Sebastián to Santander, conducted patrols to prevent supplies from reaching Carlist forces, and took part in the third siege of Bilbao and the captures of Hernani, Irún, and Fuenterrabía in 1837. Finally, Jasón sailed to Cádiz, then in early 1838 proceeded to Havana in the Captaincy General of Cuba, where upon arrival he transferred to the ship of the line Soberano. Aboard Soberano, he sailed back to Spain, reaching Ferrol on 2 April 1838.

After arriving in Spain, Lobo was assigned to the gunboat Isabel II, a paddle steamer, and returned to action along Spain's northern coast in the First Carlist War. With him aboard, Isabel II participated in actions at Ondarroa and Motrico. Fighting in the north ended with the signing of an agreement on 29 August 1839, and the Northern Naval Forces were dissolved. Lobo returned to Cádiz aboard Isabel II by the end of 1839.

Lobo next served at the naval station at Havana. While there, he had duty aboard the frigate Isabel II (a different ship from the gunboat of the same name he served on previously), the brigantines Maipu and General Laborde, and the schooner Clarita in operations along the coast of Cuba. He also received promotions to alférez de navío (ship-of-the-line ensign) on 26 May 1841 and to teniente de navío (ship-of-the-line lieutenant) on 20 February 1845. He returned to Spain in early 1846.

In the spring of 1846, the Revolution of Maria da Fonte — a popular uprising against the Cartista government of Portugal — took place. Lobo received orders to embark on the frigate Isabel II, which formed a division with the corvettes Colón and Villa de Bilbao that deployed to Lisbon, Portugal, to protect Spanish lives and property. After the situation calmed, the ships returned to Spain, arriving at Cádiz in September 1846.

Lobo was assigned to duty in the Captaincy General of the Philippines in the Spanish East Indies in 1847. In the Philippines, he took command of the gunboat Magallanes, a paddle steamer. Under his command, she took part in the Spanish-Moro Conflict participating in an assault that led to the capture of a fortress on the island of Balanguingui in the Sulu Archipelago which had served as a major gathering place for pirates in the Philippines. For his valor he was awarded the Cruz de Marina de la Diadema Real (Navy Cross of the Royal Diadem). In mid-1849 he relinquished command of Magallanes and returned to Spain.

Lobo began another assignment at Havana in April 1850. There he embarked on the frigate Cortés, which operated on coastal defense duties. He returned to Spain aboard Soberano late in 1850. Early in 1851, he took command of the brigantine Patriota, which spent most of 1851 at Lisbon to protect Spanish lives and property after a military insurrection against Portugal's Septembrist government. On 13 May 1852 Brigadier Joaquín Gutiérrez de Rubalcava appointed Lobo to serve as flag lieutenant of the division under his command. The ships of the division visited Naples and Messina in the Kingdom of the Two Sicilies, Ancona in the Papal States, and Toulon in the French Second Republic.

On 12 May 1854, Lobo became the commanding officer of the corvette Mazarredo. Under his command, Mazarredo patrolled the coast of North Africa off the Ottoman Empire's Regency of Tunis and Regency of Tripoli. She then deployed to Lisbon to protect Spanish lives and property in Portugal, show solidarity between the Spanish Bourbon Monarchy of Spain and Portugal's reigning House of Braganza after the death of Portugal's Queen Maria II, and deter any attempt to overthrow the Braganzas. Mazarredo later proceeded to Barcelona. On 13 December 1856 Lobo was appointed assistant to the Adjutant General of the Navy, and he relinquished command of Mazarredo and moved to Madrid to begin his new duties.

Lobo received a promotion to capitán de fragata (frigate captain) on 4 March 1857, and soon thereafter was sent to France to buy dredges for use in dredging the channels leading to the Arsenal de La Carraca at San Fernando. On 28 January 1859, he received orders to travel to London, where he became part of a Spanish naval commission established to purchase screw-propelled steamships for the Spanish Navy in the United Kingdom.

After Lobo returned to Spain, took command of Spanish Navy light forces — gunboats and small craft engaged in coastal operations — operating off Morocco during the Hispano-Moroccan War on 28 November 1859. During the war, which lasted until April 1860, he commanded ships and small craft engaged in the transportation of troops and supplies, shore bombardments, and amphibious landings. He took part in the Battle of Castillejos on 1 January 1860, and for his actions in the battle he was awarded the Laureate Cross of Saint Ferdinand First Class on 3 January 1860. The Spanish Army granted him the rank of coronel de infantería (colonel of infantry) in recognition of his successes during the war.

On 7 March 1861, Lobo was among the observers at the Spanish Navy's official tests of the submarine Ictíneo I — an invention of Narcís Monturiol — which took place in the harbor at Alicante. Lobo received a promotion to capitán de navío (ship-of-the-line captain) on 28 August 1863.

On 27 June 1864, Lobo was ordered to take on the role of chief of staff to the commander of the Spanish Navy's Pacific Squadron, then operating in the southeastern Pacific Ocean off South America. He joined the squadron at Pisco, Peru, on 7 September 1864, reporting aboard the screw frigate Resolución, the squadron flagship, to assume his duties. The squadron's commander, Vicemirante (Vice Admiral) Luis Hernández-Pinzón Álvarez, had seized the Chincha Islands from Peru in April 1864, and when Lobo arrived tensions were high between Spain and Peru. The Spanish government disapproved of Hernández-Pinzón's actions, and replaced him with Vicealmirante (Vice Admiral) José Manuel Pareja in October 1864. After Pareja's arrival in the southeastern Pacific, the screw frigate Villa de Madrid joined the squadron and became Pareja's flagship, with Lobo reporting aboard her as Pareja's chief of staff. On 27 January 1865 a Peruvian government representative, Manuel Ignacio de Vivanco, and Pareja signed the Preliminary Treaty of Peace and Friendship between Peru and Spain, known informally as the Vivanco–Pareja Treaty, aboard Villa de Madrid in an ultimately unsuccessful attempt to settle claims between the two countries that instead sparked the outbreak of the Peruvian Civil War of 1865.

=== Chincha Islands War ===
The political situation in the region further deteriorated during 1865 when Pareja steamed to Valparaíso, Chile, to settle Spanish claims. When Chile refused to settle, Pareja announced a blockade of Chilean ports, and the Chincha Islands War broke out between Spain and Chile on 24 September 1865. Early setbacks in the war culminating in a humiliating Spanish naval defeat in the Battle of Papudo on 26 November 1865 — in which the Chileans captured the Spanish Navy schooner Virgen de Covadonga — prompted Pareja to commit suicide aboard Villa de Madrid off Valparaíso, shooting himself in his cabin on 28 November 1865 while lying on his bed wearing his dress uniform. In his testament, he requested not to be buried in Chilean waters; accordingly, he was buried on the high seas.

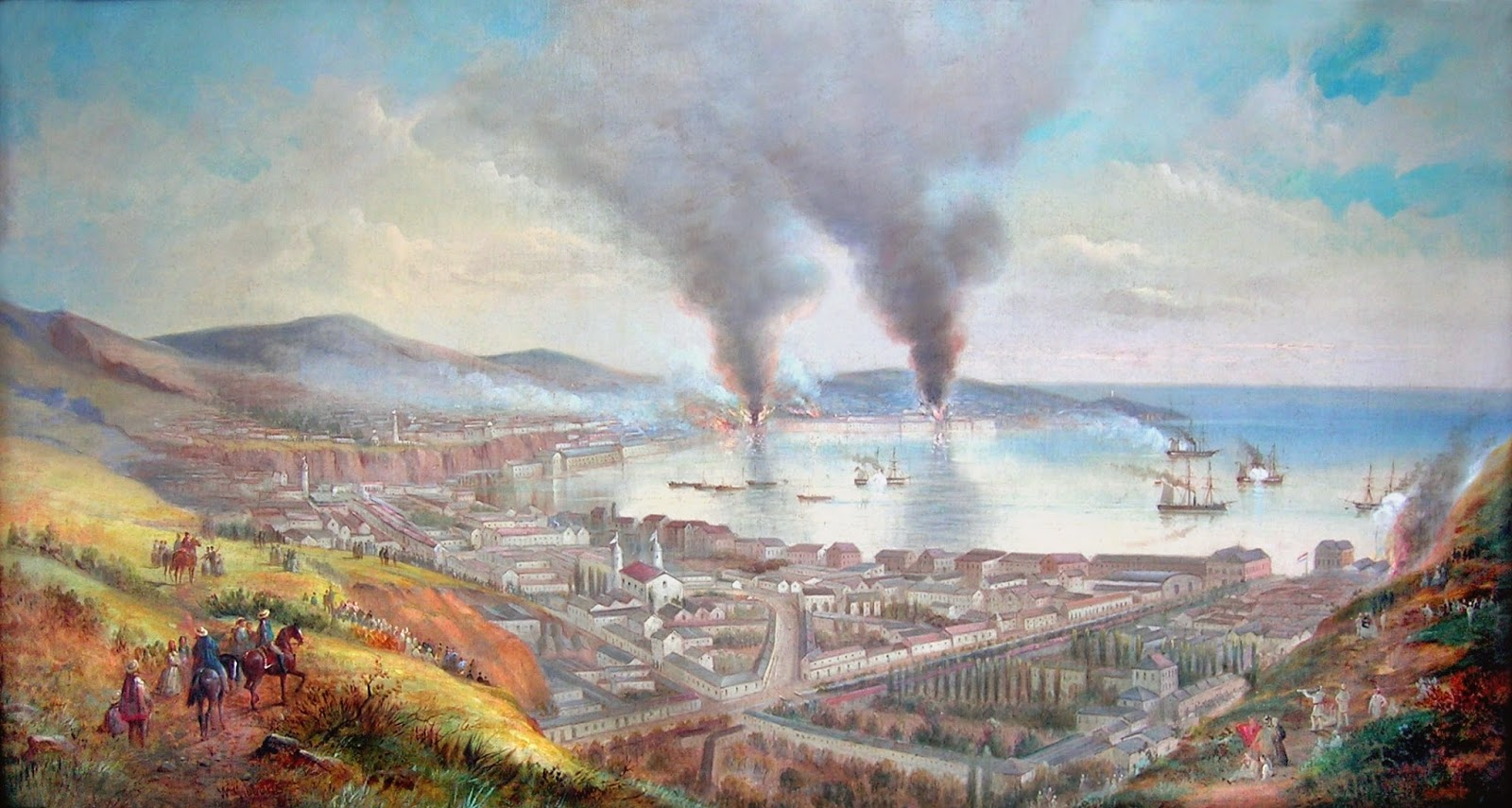
Valparaíso Chile during the bombardment by the admiral Méndez Núñez. (Painting by William Gibbons, ca. 1870)

Contralmirante (Counter Admiral) Casto Méndez Núñez was aboard the ironclad Numancia at Callao, Peru, as her commanding officer when Pareja died. Numancia rendezvoused with Villa de Madrid and the screw frigate Berenguela at Caldera, Chile, on 12 December. Learning of Pareja's death, Méndez Núñez took charge of the Pacific Squadron that day and transferred to Villa de Madrid, inheriting Lobo as his chief of staff. Peru and Ecuador joined the war on Chile's side in January 1866 and Bolivia joined the war against Spain on 22 March 1866, closing all the Pacific ports of South America south of Colombia to Spanish ships. Under orders to take punitive action against South American ports, Méndez Núñez selected undefended Valparaíso as his target, although he found the idea of attacking an undefended port repugnant. On the morning of 31 March 1866 his squadron arrived at Valparaíso, with Méndez Núñez and Lobo aboard Numancia. Numancia fired two shots at 08:00 to signal the rest of the squadron to open fire, then withdrew offshore and took no further part in the bombardment, instead standing by to intervene if foreign warships, which had gathered near the harbor entrance, tried to interfere. Facing no opposition, Villa de Madrid, Resolución, the screw frigate Reina Blanca, and the corvette Vencedora began a three-hour bombardment of Valparaíso at 09:00 while Berenguela and the sidewheel paddle steamer Paquete de Maule stood by offshore to guard against any attempt at escape by Chilean merchant ships. By the time it ended at 12:00, the bombardment had killed two people, injured 10, and sunk 33 merchant ships in the harbor, destroying Chile's merchant fleet. It inflicted US$10 million (about US$224 million in 2011) in damage.

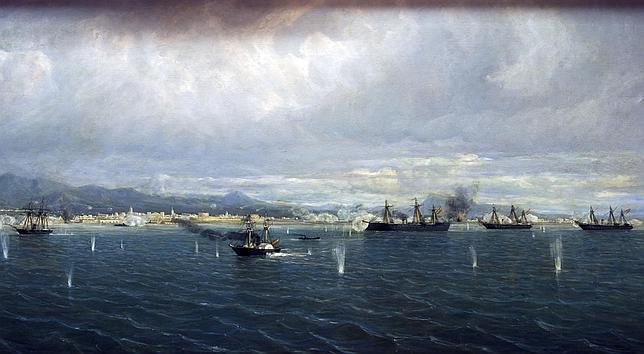
The 19th-century painting The Battle of Callao by Rafael Monleón y Torres (1843–1900). Numancia is at center.

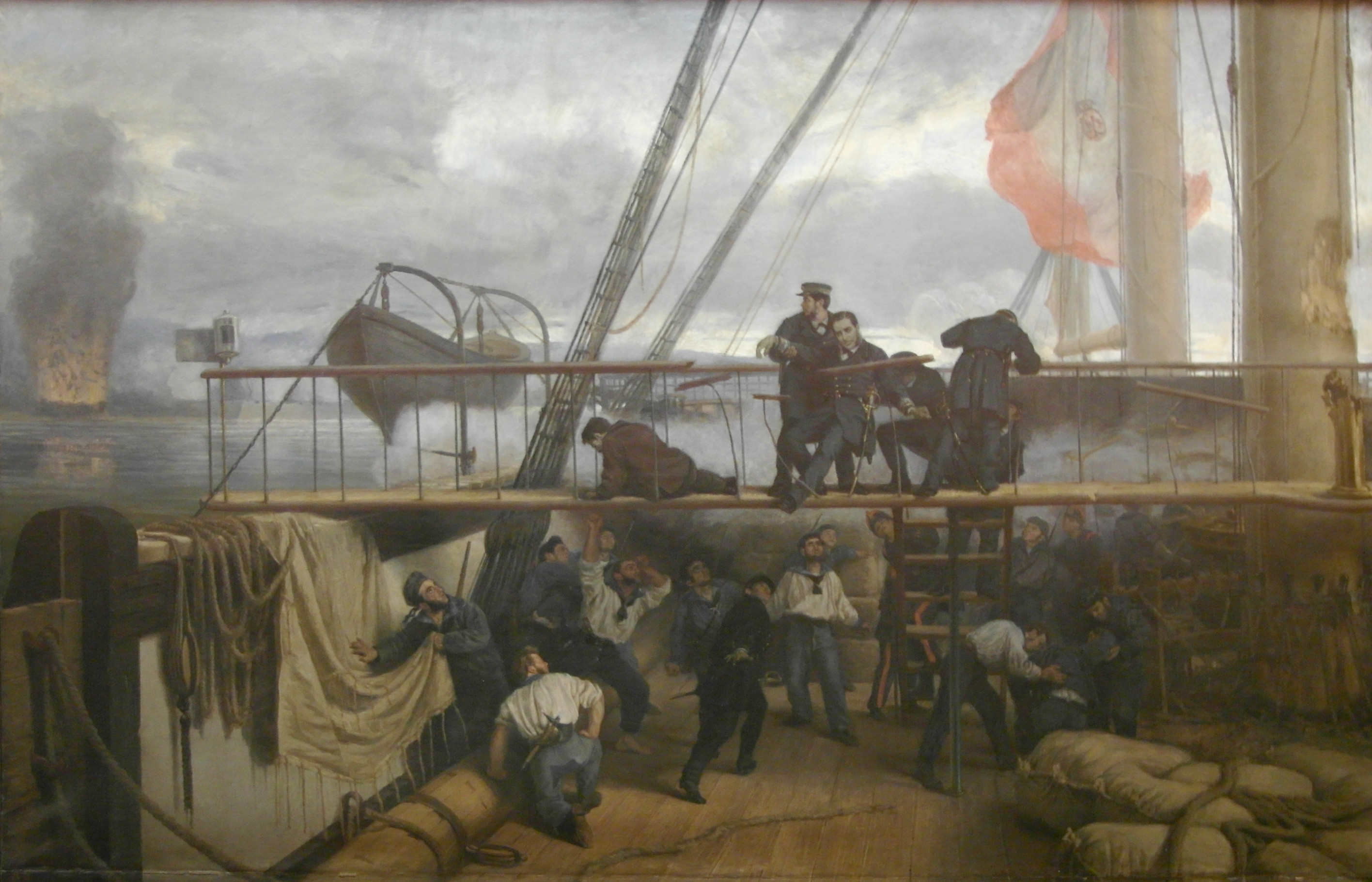
The moment where Núñez fell wounded on Numancia's bridge

Méndez Núñez chose the heavily defended port of Callao for his next attack. On the morning of 2 May 1866 the Spanish ships entered Callao Bay, beginning the Battle of Callao, the largest battle of the Chincha Islands War. Vencedora and auxiliary ships stood off near San Lorenzo Island while the other six Spanish ships attacked Callao, with Numancia, Resolución, and the screw frigate Almansa assigned to bombard the northern part of the harbor while Berenguela, Reina Blanca, and Villa de Madrid shelled the southern part. Numancia fired the first shot at 11:55. and soon all the Spanish ships were exchanging fire with the Peruvian fortifications. Numancia fired over a thousand rounds and took 45 hits. At one point, she struck bottom in 30 feet (9.1 m) of water and had some difficulty pulling off the shoal. Seeing that she was immobilized temporarily, Peruvian gunners focused on her, and one shell struck her bridge, from which Méndez Núñez was commanding the squadron. The shell carried away the binnacle, and nine shell fragments struck Méndez Núñez. He tried to continue, but collapsed after a few minutes. Lobo and Numancia′s commanding officer, Capitán de navío (Ship-of-the-Line Captain) Juan Bautista Antequera y Bobadilla — a future vicealmirante (vice admiral) and minister of the navy — caught him as he fell. Méndez Núñez was forced to turn over command of the squadron to Lobo. By 16:00, only three Peruvian guns still were firing. Running low on ammunition and with only the last three Peruvian guns still firing, the Spanish squadron ceased fire at 16:40 as dusk fell and fog began to form in the harbor.

Méndez Núñez's squadron spent the next several days at San Lorenzo Island just off Callao, making repairs and tending to casualties. The Chincha Islands War ended in a ceasefire on 9 May 1866. On 10 May 1866, Mendez Núñez's squadron departed. Mendez Núñez viewed an eastward passsage around Cape Horn in winter as too dangerous for ther damaged Berenguela and Numancia, so he divided the squadron, sending Berenguela, Numancia, Vencedora, and three auxiliary ships westward across the Pacific to the Philippines in the Spanish East Indies for repairs while he led the rest of the ships on a voyage eastward around Cape Horn to Rio de Janeiro, Brazil, with Villa de Madrid as his flagship. Lobo made the voyage aboard Villa de Madrid, which passed around Cape Horn under sail in winter without warm clothing or fresh food, and scurvy broke out among her crew. By the time the squadron made port at Rio de Janeiro on 24 June 1866, 31 members of Villa de Madrid′s crew had died and 350 more were sick. For his performance in the Chincha Islands War, Lobo received a promotion to brigadier on 20 June 1866.

Despite the May 1866 ceasefire, Spain had not yet reached a peace settlement with its adversaries in the Chincha Islands War, so after arriving at Rio de Janeiro, the squadron began patrols in the South Atlantic Ocean. The arrival of the screw frigates Concepción and Navas de Tolosa allowed Méndez Núñez to release those of his ships in the poorest condition — Reina Blanca, Resolución, and Villa de Madrid — to return to Spain.. Almansa, Concepción, and Navas de Tolosa formed a division of Méndez Núñez's squadron, for which Lobo remained chief of staff. Méndez Núñez's squadron arrived at the Rio de la Plata (River Plate) on 12 December 1866.

After the Ministry of the Navy received word that a combined Chilean Navy-Peruvian Navy squadron planned to cross into the Atlantic Ocean, Méndez Núñez received orders to return to Rio de Janeiro. On 24 December 1866, the Ministry of the Navy ordered Méndez Núñez to move to Havana and prepare to defend the Antilles against attack. These orders reached Méndez Núñez on 1 February 1867. On 20 March 1867 Almansa, Concepción,and Navas de Tolosa, arrived at Santiago de Cuba on the southeastern coast of Cuba under Méndez Núñez's overall command. The ships then proceeded to Havana, which they reached on 26 March 1867. Navas de Tolosa captured the Peruvian Navy steamer Rayo off Cartagena, Colombia, on 25 April 1867. The squadron also visited Saint Thomas in the Danish West Indies during its Caribbean deployment.

After Méndez Núñez received new orders to proceed to Rio de Janeiro, he transferred his flag to Almansa and his squadron got underway, arriving at Rio de Janeiro in August 1867. The squadron again moved to the Rio de la Plata in November 1867. Navas de Tolosa later reconnoitered the Fernando de Noronha archipelago to see if enemy ships acquired in Europe were present there. In 1868, a peace settlement finally brought the Chincha Islands War officially to an end.

=== 1868–1873 ===
When Méndez Núñez received orders to relinquish command of the squadron and return to Spain for a new assignment, he boarded Navas de Tolosa for the voyage. Navas de Tolosa departed Rio de Janeiro on 6 November 1868 to transport him to Spain. Méndez Núñez turned over command of the squadron to Lobo, with Concepción and Reina Blanca forming a division. Although, Lobo was not yet of high enough rank to serve as the Spanish supreme commander in South America, he was authorized the "insignia of preference," allowing him to fly the flag of a more senior officer and carry out his duties with the authority of such an officer.

When an insurrection against the government broke out in Uruguay in May 1869, Lobo ordered Concepción to patrol the coast of the Río de la Plata to protect Spanish citizens. By the time Concepción arrived at Montevideo, Uruguay, on 13 June the insurrection had been defeated, so she returned to Rio de Janeiro. On 14 September 1869, Lobo received a promotion to contralmirante (counter admiral), and his appointment as commander of the South American Squadron became official on 2 November 1870. He relinquished command of the squadron on 27 August 1871 and returned to Spain.

On 12 December 1871, Lobo received an appointment as the Captain General of the Ferrol Department. He took security measures and deterrent actions to prevent any Republican uprising from taking place during his tenure, and on 21 May 1872 was awarded the Cross of Naval Merit with White Decoration. In July 1972, he relinquished command.

=== Cantonal Rebellion ===
In July 1873, the Cantonal Rebellion began in Spain. At the time, Lobo was on medical leave in Chiclana de la Frontera, taking the waters at a spa. In response to the rebellion, Lobo made his way to Algeciras, where he raised his flag aboard the paddle gunboat Alerta and called together the commanding officers of other ships, who placed themselves under his command. He managed to assemble a squadron and overcome the indiscipline of the crews of some of its ships, and placed the squadron at the disposal of the central government. He then steamed his squadron to Cádiz, preventing the departure from that port of three armoured frigates and a large steamship whose crews had rebelled against the government in support of the Cantonalists. He assembled a squadron of four screw frigates and four other steamships, and the central government recognized him for his courage, daring, loyalty, and discipline and appointed him commander-in-chief of the Mediterranean Squadron.

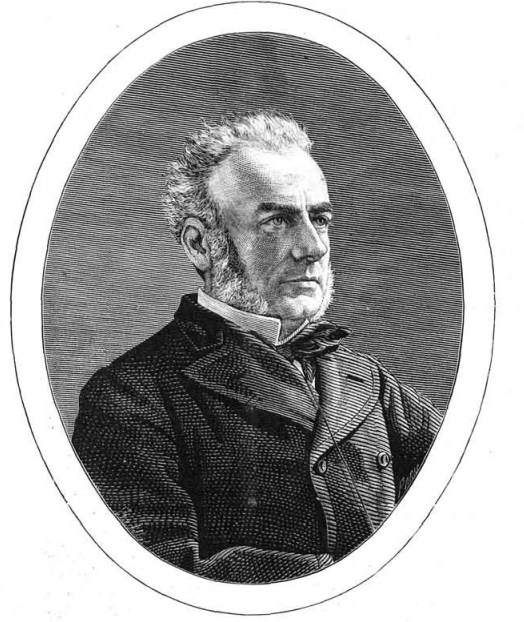
Lobo in an engraving from La Ilustración Española y Americana, 30 June 1876.

The Imperial German Navy armored frigate SMS Friedrich Carl, and the British Royal Navy battleship HMS Swiftsure intercepted two Cantonalist ships — Almansa and the armored frigate Vitoria — in the Mediterranean Sea off Spain on 1 August 1873 and seized them as pirate ships on 2 August. Almansa and Vitoria were sent to Gibraltar, where the British returned them to the Spanish central government on 26 September 1873 after Lobo led negotiations for their return. The Spanish central government incorporated them into Lobo's squadron, and Lobo made Vitoria his flagship.

Lobo received orders to blockade the Cantonalist squadron at Cartagena, where a Cantonalist junta had established the Canton of Cartagena. His squadron, composed of Vitoria, Almansa, Navas de Tolosa, the screw frigate Carmén, the screw corvette Diana, the paddle gunboats Colón and Ciudad de Cádiz, and the screw schooner Prosperidad, got underway from Gibraltar bound for Cartagena on 5 October 1873. It arrived off Cartagena on 10 October 1873. During the evening of 10 October, Lobo kept his ships just outside Cartagena's harbor off of Escombreras, an islet at the mouth of the harbor. Later, during the night of 10–11 October, he ordered his ships to raise sail, probably to economize on their use of coal, and a strong north wind blew his squadron offshore and eastward to a position east of Portmán.

On 11 October 1873, the Cantonalist squadron — made up of Numancia (the flagship), the armoured corvette Méndez Núñez, the armoured frigate Tetuán, and the paddle gunboat Despertador del Cantón (formerly named Fernando el Católico in Spanish Navy service) — sortied from Cartagena to attack Lobo's force. The Battle of Portmán ensued. Numancia opened fire on Vitoria but her shots missed wildly. Vitoria′s crew returned fire far more accurately, forcing Numancia to retreat. Lobo then ordered Vitoria to fire on Méndez Núñez. As Vitoria closed with Méndez Núñez, Méndez Núñez began aggressive maneuvers that suggested to Lobo that she was attempting to ram and board Vitoria, and Lobo ordered Vitoria′s crew to prepare to repel boarders. However, Lobo soon realized that Méndez Núñez was trying to break off the engagement and flee. Vitoria fired off a single broadside and opened heavy rifle fire on Méndez Núñez, receiving almost no return fire. Lobo then turned his attention to Tetuán. As Vitoria pursued Tetuán, Tetuán steamed dangerously close to the rocky shoreline. Realizing that if he continued the pursuit, Tetuán would wreck herself on the coast, Lobo ordered Vitoria to alter course and let Tetuán pass so that Tetuán could survive and be reincorporated into the Spanish Navy after the Cantonalist rebellion was put down. The battle concluded when the Cantonalist ships returned to Cartagena. No ships were lost and casualties on both sides were light.

After the battle, Lobo′s squadron tried to blockade Cartagena. However, when the Cantonal squadron sortied again on 13 October 1873, Vitoria had only enough coal for two days' steaming, and the Cantonal squadron, under a new commander, maintained a far more disciplined formation than it had on 11 October. Rather than engage the Cantonalists, Lobo chose to withdraw the central government squadron toward Gibraltar, expecting to receive reinforcement of his squadron in the form of the armored frigate Zaragoza and the paddle gunboat Ulloa. This withdrawal led the central government to dismiss Lobo on 15 October and replace him as commander of the Mediterranean Squadron with Contralmirante (Counter Admiral) Nicolás Chicarro. Lobo's squadron anchored at Gibraltar on 16 October, and on 18 October Lobo turned over command of the squadron to Chicarro. He then traveled to Madrid to explain his actions to the President of the First Spanish Republic, Emilio Castelar. Castelar approved his actions and allowed him to remain in Madrid as a gesture of appreciation from the government.

The Cantonal Rebellion ended with the fall of Cartagena to central government forces on 3 January 1874. On 15 January, Lobo was apppointed captain general of the Department of Cartagena. Upon arriving, he found the Cartagena Naval Base in a state of disrepair and Tetuán badly damaged by a fire and sunk in the harbor, a total loss. He also noted that Fernando el Católico had sunk off the coast after a collison with Numancia. He took action to clear the harbor and repair the naval base, which was fully operational within a few months.

=== Death and burial ===
During the final third of 1875, Lobo requested that he be relieved of command in Cartagena due to illness. After turning over command to his replacement, he traveled to Madrid, where several physicians examined him. They diagnosed him with liver cancer and recommended that he go to Paris for further treament. He underwent a difficult surgery in Paris, but died on 5 April 1876.

The government of Spain ordered the immediate return of Lobo's remains to Spain. Accordingly, the paddle gunboat León steamed to Marseille on the Mediterranean coast of France, where she embarked his remains. She transported them to the Arsenal de La Carraca in San Fernando, where she arrived on 2 May 1876. On 4 May 1876, he was buried in the San Fernando cemetery. His widow, using private funds, commissioned the construction of a mausoleum within the Panteón de Marinos Ilustres (Pantheon of Illustrious Sailors) in San Fernando, It was assembled and installed in the Pantheon in 1886, and on 14 November 1886, Lobo's remains were transferred to it with full military honors.

Lobo's tomb occupies the second chapel on the right, or western, side of the Pantheon. It bears the inscription:

"Here lie the mortal remains of Rear Admiral Don Miguel Lobo Malagamba, Chief of Staff of the Pacific Squadron in 1866, and Captain General of the Department of Cartagena and its reorganizer in 1874. A gallant soldier, distinguished publisher, and eminent mariner, he consecrated both sword and pen to his Homeland throughout an honorable life that ended in Paris on 5 April 1876, at 54 years of age."

== Other activities ==
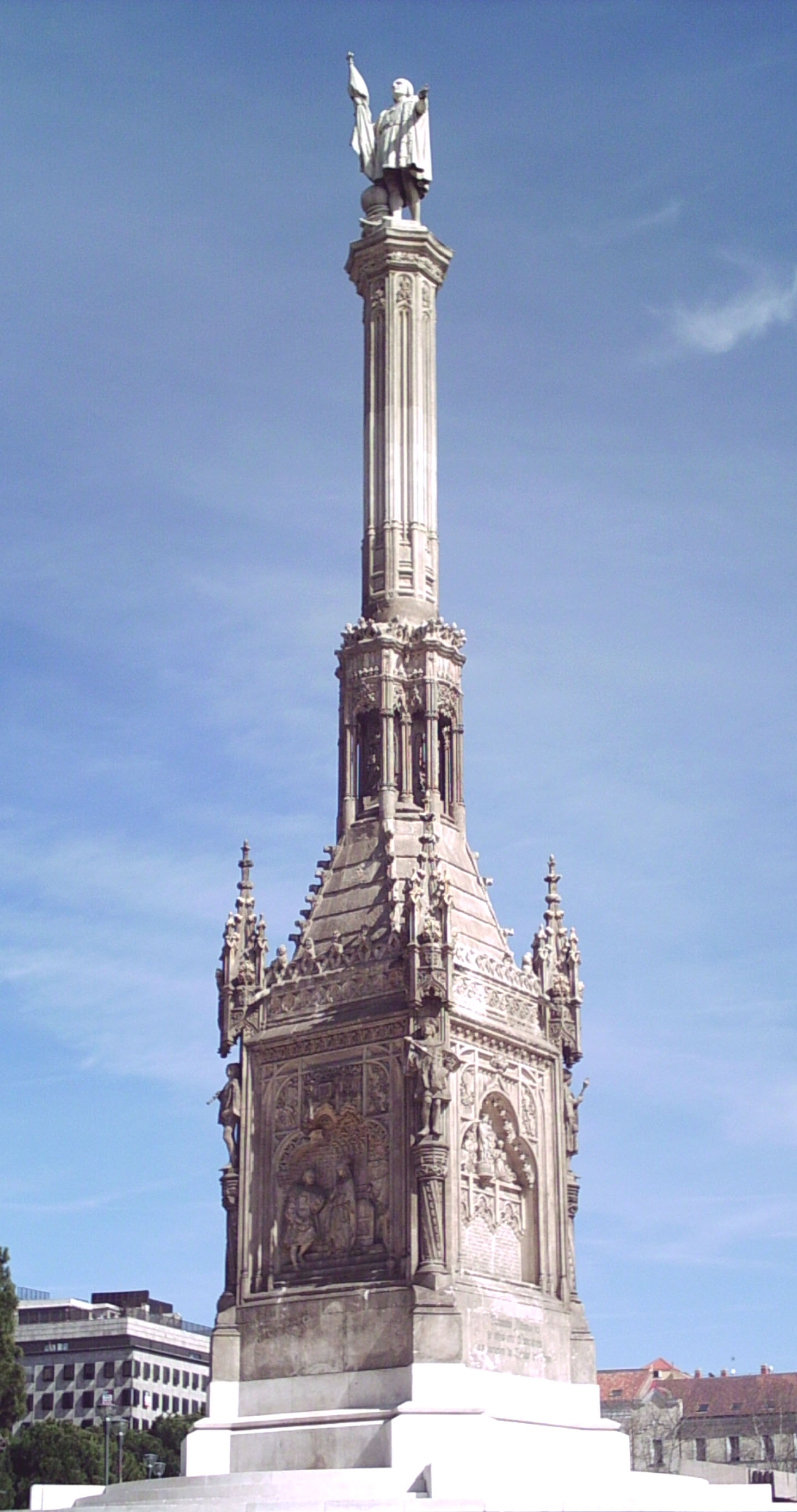
The Monument to Columbus in Madrid on 12 March 2006. Lobo was the driving force behind its construction, but did not live to see its construction begin.

Lobo was an erudite man, an historian, and an accomplished writer who published a number of works. He spoke several languages, and translated several important books into Spanish. He amassed a personal library of 3,289 volumes. He bequeathed his library to his hometown of San Fernando, entrusting it to the city council on the condition that it be accessible to the public, bear his surname, and serve as the foundation for a larger library. His widow and the San Fernando municipal authorities fulfilled his wishes, and the library opened on 29 October 1879 during a visit to the city by King Alfonso XII. Learning of the library’s origins, Alfonso XII contributed several works from his own personal collection to it. The library's collection subsequently expanded further when local residents donated books to it.

Lobo is considered the primary driving force behind the construction and installation of the Monument to Columbus in Madrid. He originated the idea of creating a national monument to commemorate Christopher Columbus, and between 1861 and 1863 he used proceeds from a book he published to open a national subscription campaign in Spain to raise the money to pay for it. In 1864 Queen Isabella II issued a royal decree authorizing the Spanish government and the municipal council of Madrid to erect the monument. The Glorious Revolution forced Isbaella II into exile in September 1868, aborting the project, although Lobo maintained and protected the money he had raised for it. In 1873, Lobo revived the project, convincing the government of the First Spanish Republic to approve it and to donate surplus military bronze from the Ministry of War for its construction. Leveraging the diplomatic ties he had developed during his time in South America, in 1874 he convinced the government of Uruguay to donate native Uruguayan marble for the construction of the monument so that its pedestal literally would — as he saw it — "rest on American soil." He died before construction began, but in 1881 his widow provided the money he had raised to yet another effort to construct the monument, which finally was completed in 1892.

Lobo was elected to the Congress of Deputies as a deputy from Cartagena on 20 January 1876. Due to his final illness, he never took office.

== Honors and awards ==
- Navy Cross of the Royal Diadem
- Laureate Cross of Saint Ferdinand First Class (3 January 1860)
- Cross of Naval Merit Second Class with Red Decoration (1866)
- Commemorative Medal of the Battle of Callao (1866)
- Grand Cross of the Order of Isabella the Catholic (1870)
- Grand Cross of Naval Merit with White Decoration (21 May 1872)

== Commemoration ==
Two Spanish Navy ships, both transports, have borne the name Almirante Lobo in Lobo's honor. The first was in commission from 1909 to 1942 and the second from 1954 to 1977.
