= Bombardment of Valparaíso =

Battle between Spain and Chile on the coast of Valparaíso

- Part of Chincha Islands War
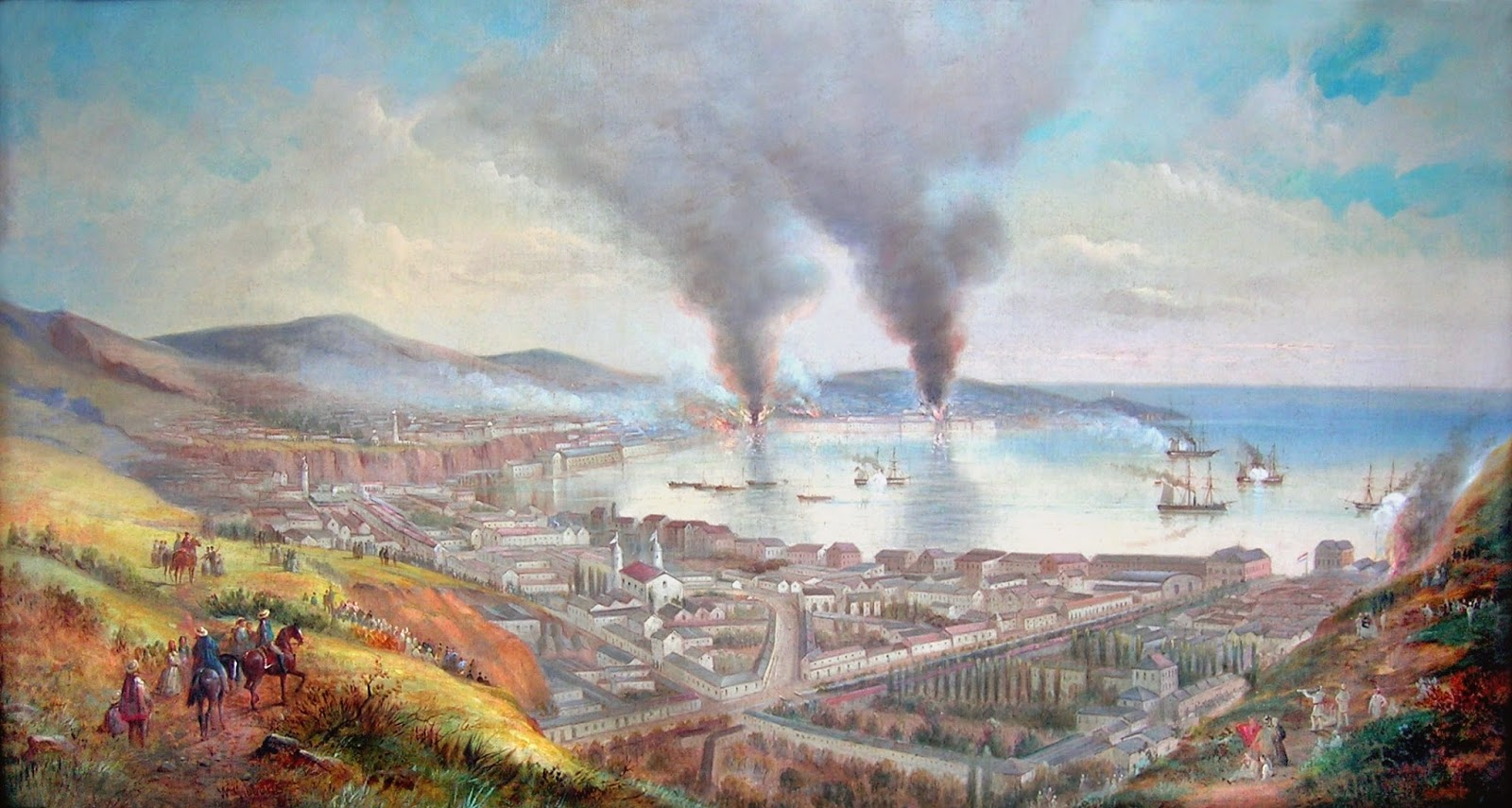
- The Spanish fleet shelling the port of Valparaíso
Date	31 March 1866
Location	Valparaíso, Chile
Result	Spanish victory

Belligerents
Spain	Chile

Commanders and leaders
(Spain) Casto Méndez Núñez	N/A

Strength
1 ironclad 5 frigates 1 corvette	N/A

Casualties and losses
None	2 killed 10 wounded 33 ships sunk

The bombardment of Valparaíso on 31 March 1866 took place during the Chincha Islands War, when a Spanish fleet shelled, burned and destroyed the undefended port of Valparaíso.

== Background ==
After the humiliating defeat at the Battle of Papudo and the indecisive Battle of Abtao, Rear Admiral Casto Méndez Núñez was ordered to take punitive action against South American ports. When the Chilean government ordered that vessels supplying or communicating with the Spanish fleet should not be allowed to enter Chilean ports, Méndez Núñez's first target became the most important and undefended Chilean city of Valparaíso.

=== Attempts at mediation ===
Efforts to mediate were initially steered by European diplomats whose countrymen were most affected by the initial blockade of Chilean ports and by the threat of bombardment. High-level contacts took place intensively in late 1865 and early 1866 between London, Paris, and Madrid. A formula to resolve the conflict appeared, at one stage, to have been secured. In the final two weeks, the United States was especially active. The American minister to Chile, General Hugh Judson Kilpatrick and the U.S. naval commander John Rodgers, who was at port commanding a United States Navy squadron composed of the ironclad monitor USS Monadnock and the warships Powhatan, Tuscarora, and Vanderbilt, attempted a last-minute settlement with Méndez Núñez.

To that effect, the Americans enlisted the cooperation of the commander of the British Pacific Station, Rear-admiral Joseph Denman, who had under his command two warships: HMS Sutlej and HMS Leander. Despite coming under great pressure from British merchants in the city, after consulting with the chief British diplomat in Chile William Taylour Thomson Denman decided to enforce strict neutrality, refusing to let his ships cooperate. Thomson himself was more concerned with the well-being of Spanish civilians in Chile than with the concerns of the British merchants in Chile and did not want the Royal Navy to do anything to provoke the Spanish.

Ultimately, all the attempts at mediation failed, as the chief condition of Méndez Núñez was the proper salute to the Spanish flag, the return by the Chileans of the captured schooner Covadonga and the immediate payment of a crippling indemnity. The talks broke over the matter of the flag salute. When Kilpatrick threatened to defend the port with the US squadron and attack the Spanish fleet, Méndez Núñez responded by stating: "I will be forced to sink [the American ships], because even if I have one ship left I will proceed with the bombardment. Spain, the Queen and I prefer honor without ships than ships without honor." Méndez Núñez, notwithstanding the protest of the diplomatic corps, gave notice on March 27 to all neutrals to evacuate the city.

== Bombardment ==
At 7 am on March 31, the Spanish fleet took positions in front of their targets. It consisted of Numancia, Resolución, Villa de Madrid, Reina Blanca, Vencedora, and Paquete de Maule. The frigate Berenguela remained behind to guard against the possible escape of the merchant fleet. At 8.10 AM, the Numancia discharged two shots as final notice and to give opportunity for the people still in town to take cover. The bombardment itself started at 9 am and lasted for three hours without fire being returned, as Valparaíso was totally defenseless.

The Spanish bombarded the town unhindered. The loss in public and private property was estimated at $1,000,000, and in merchandise at $9,000,000, huge sums at the time. A 2011 account suggests that in that year's money the losses amounted to the equivalent of around $224,000,000.

The action created an international scandal. While the Spanish were heavily criticized for attacking an unarmed city, so too was the British government for not employing its own naval force to protect the lives and property of its own nationals. Most of the losses were actually endured by British merchants, and a large argument developed in the British Parliament when news arrived in May 1866.

== Painting ==
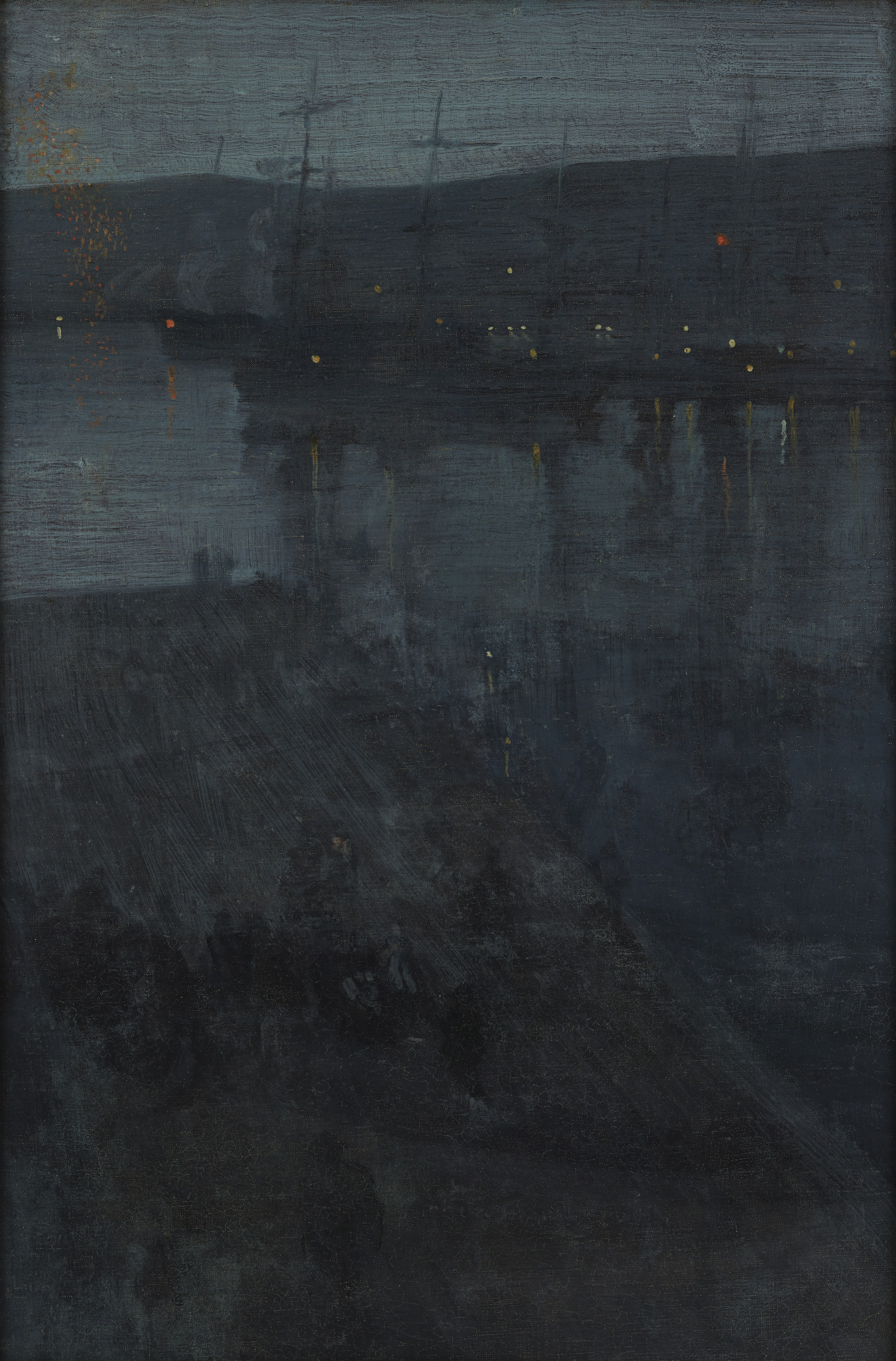
Whistler's Nocturne

James McNeill Whistler, who was on board one of the American ships, painted his famous "Nocturne in Blue and Gold: Valparaíso Bay" the night before the bombardment. It shows the Chilean merchant fleet at its moorings where it would be destroyed the next morning.

== Sources ==
- Barros Arana, Diego (1884–1902). Historia Jeneral de Chile (in Spanish). Vol. I–XVI. Santiago, Chile: Rafael Jover.
- García Martínez, José Ramón (1997). "La Campaña del Pacífico (1862-1866)" (PDF). Revista de Marina (in Spanish). Archived from the original (PDF) on 17 June 2009.
- Jones, Colin (2011). "Battle at Valparaíso". In Jordan, John (ed.). Warship 2011. London: Conway. pp. 94–101. ISBN 978-1-84486-133-0.
- López Urrutia, Carlos. "Chile: A Brief Naval History". Historical Text Archive.
- "The War with Spain of 1865–1866". Archived from the original on 2007-12-31.
- "Guerra del Pacífico - 1864–1865 Conflicto de España contra Chile y Perú". Historia y Arqueologia Marítima (in Spanish).
- "España y la Guerra del Pacífico" (in Spanish). Archived from the original on 2009-12-11.
- "Liberation of the Chinchas". Archived from the original on March 12, 2008.
