= Peruvian ironclad Victoria =

History
- Name: Victoria
- Builder: Maestranza Naval de Bellavista, Callao, Peru
- Completed: early 1866
- Commissioned: 30 July 1864

General characteristics
- Type: Monitor
- Displacement: 300 tonnes (300 long tons)
- Length: 50 m (164 ft 1 in)
- Beam: 10 m (32 ft 10 in)
- Draft: 4 m (13 ft 1 in)
- Propulsion: 1 × locomotive engine
- Speed: Very slow
- Crew: 44
- Armament: 1 × smoothbore 64-pounder gun
- Armor: 3 inches (76 mm)

BAP Victoria was an ironclad monitor built for the Peruvian Navy in the mid-1860s. The ship participated in the Battle of Callao in 1866 during the Chincha Islands War of 1864–66 and was not damaged. Her ultimate fate is unknown.

== Description ==
Victoria was 150 feet (45.7 m) long, had a beam of 30 feet (9.1 m) and a draft of 12–13 feet (3.7–4.0 m). The ship displaced 300 long tons (300 t). She was powered by a steam engine taken from a locomotive and was thus very slow. The ship was armed with a single smoothbore 64-pounder gun. Victoria was protected by 3 inches (76 mm) of armor and had a freeboard of 20 inches (510 mm).

== Construction and career ==
Designed by the brothers José Tomás and Manuel José Ramos, construction of Victoria began on 30 July 1864, when she was "commissioned" in the Peruvian Navy, at the Maestranza Naval de Bellavista shipyard in Callao, Peru. She was completed in early 1866.

Little is known of the ship's activities during the Battle of Callao on 2 May 1866, but she was struck by a single Spanish 68-pounder shell that failed to penetrate her armor. Nothing is known about any subsequent activities or her fate.

== Bibliography ==
- Greene, Jack & Massignani, Alessandro (1998). Ironclads at War: The Origin and Development of the Armored Warship, 1854–1891. Combined Publishing. ISBN 978-0-938289-58-6.
- Pixley, William; Walker, Hartley P. (2001). "Question 33/00: Peruvian Warships Loa and Victoria". Warship International. XXXVIII (3): 248. ISSN 0043-0374.
- Wilson, Herbert Wrigley (1896). Ironclads in Action: A Sketch of Naval Warfare from 1855 to 1895. S. Low, Marston and company.
