= Paquete de Maule =

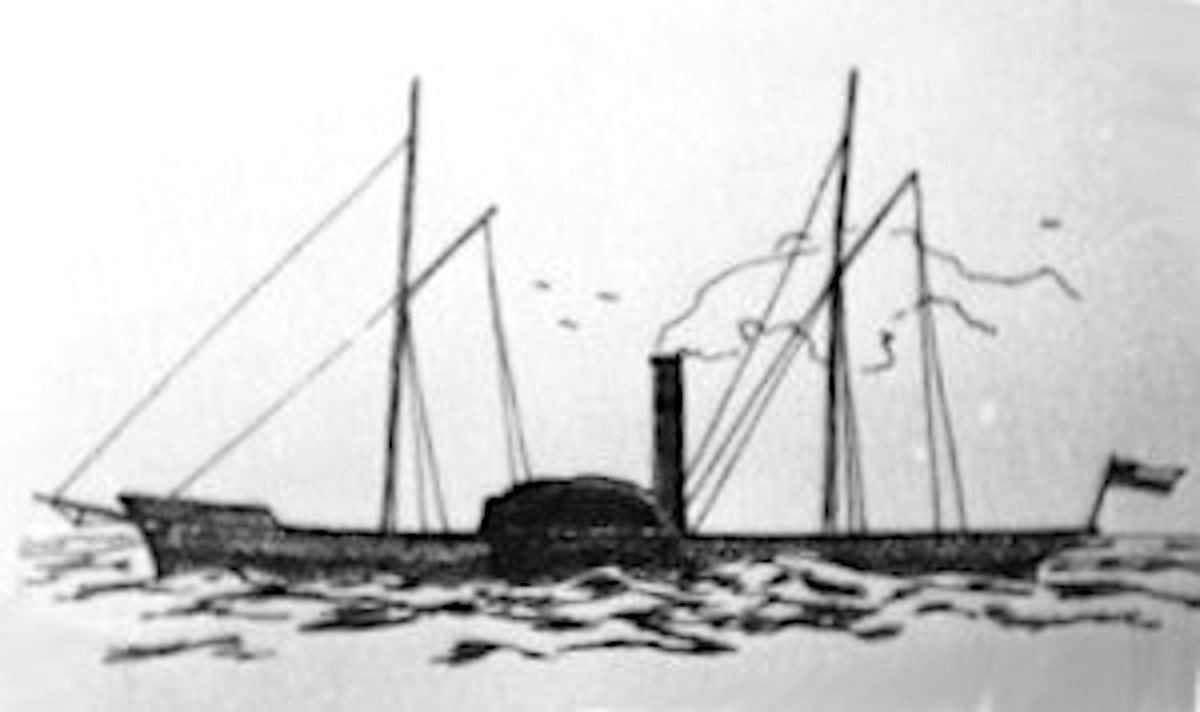
- Paquete de Maule

History

Chile
- Name: Paquete de Maule
- Builder: Lawrence & Foulks (NY)
- Completed: 1861
- In service: 1861
- Out of service: 1866
- Captured: 6 March 1866
- Fate: Captured by Spanish Navy during the Chincha Islands War

Spain
- Commissioned: 6 March 1866
- Fate: Burned and scuttled 10 May 1866

General characteristics
- Type: Sidewheel steamer
- Tons burthen: 407 tons
- Length: 165 ft (50 m)
- Beam: 29 ft (8.8 m)
- Draft: 8 ft 6 in (2.59 m)
- Depth of hold: 9 ft (2.7 m)
- Propulsion: 2 × 32 in (81 cm) cylinder, 8 ft (2.4 m) stroke vertical beam steam engines; 2 × flue boilers in hold, no blowers
- Sail plan: Brig
- Armament: Chile: None; Spain:2 cannons

Paquete de Maule (also spelled Paquette de Maule and Paquete del Maule) was a small merchant sidewheel steamer built in the United States in 1861 for operation along the Chilean coast. Converted into a gunboat for service during the Chincha Islands War, she was captured by Spain and scuttled shortly thereafter.

== Construction and design ==
Paquete de Maule, a 400-ton sidewheel steamer, was built by Lawrence & Foulks in 1861 at Williamsburg, New York for G. K. Stevenson & Co., who planned to operate the vessel between Valparaíso and Maule, Chile.

Paquete de Maule was 165 feet long, with a beam of 29 feet, depth of hold 9 feet, and draft of 8 feet 6 inches. She was built of white oak and locust, with square frames fastened with copper and treenails, and strengthened with diagonal and double laid braces. She was powered by a pair of 32-inch cylinder, 8-foot stroke vertical beam steam engines built by the Neptune Iron Works of New York, driving two 24-foot-diameter (7.3 m) wooden sidewheels. Steam was supplied by a pair of flue boilers without blowers, located in the hold. The vessel was also brig-rigged for auxiliary sail power.

== Career ==
During the Chincha Islands War, the Paquete del Maule served as an auxiliary ship to the Chilean fleet and was not armed. On March 6, 1866, while en route from Lota to Montevideo with a crew of 126 men destined to complete the crews of the ironclads Huáscar and Independencia, she was captured by the Spanish screw frigate Reina Blanca and armoured frigate Numancia at the Gulf of Arauco.

On 10 May 1866, after the Battle of Callao, the Paquete del Maule was burned and scuttled by the Spanish near San Lorenzo Island off the coast of Peru because they chose not to take her with them on their postwar withdrawal from South American waters.

== See also ==
- Chincha Islands War
- Battle of Callao

== Bibliography ==
- Armada de Chile. "Paquete del Maule, vapor (1º)". Unidades Navales Históricas (in Spanish).
- Frazer, John F. (Ed.) (1863): Journal of the Franklin Institute, Volume XLV, January–June 1863, p. 42, Franklin Institute, Philadelphia.
- García Martínez, José Ramón (1997). "LA CAMPAÑA DEL PACIFICO (1862-1866)" (PDF). Revista de Marina (in Spanish). Archived from the original (PDF) on 17 June 2009.
- López Urrutia, Carlos. "Chile: A Brief Naval History". Historical Text Archive.
