= Battle of Callao =

1866 naval battle between Spain and Peru

- Part of the Chincha Islands War
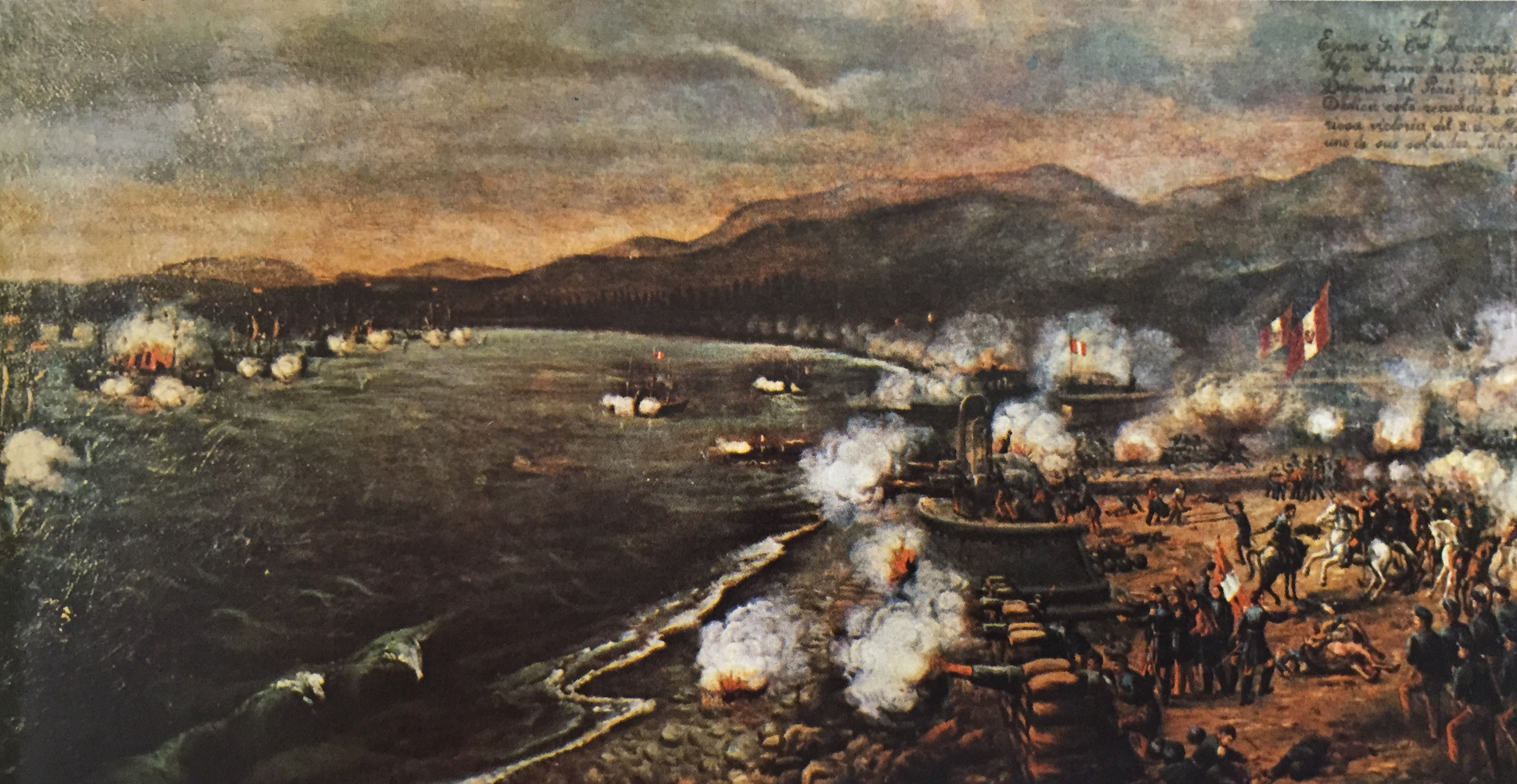
- Spanish ships exchange fire with Peruvian coastal defenses at the Battle of Callao.
Date	May 2, 1866
Location	Callao, Peru 12°02′52″S 77°09′13″W
Result	Inconclusive

Belligerents
Spain	Peru

Commanders and leaders
(Spanish Empire) Casto Méndez Núñez (WIA)	(Peru) Mariano I. Prado

Strength
1 ironclad 5 frigates 1 corvette	2 small ironclads 3 gunboats 52 shore-based guns 3,000 infantry and cavalry

Casualties and losses
43 killed; 83 wounded; 68 lightly wounded;	Sources vary: 180–200 killed and wounded 83 – 90 killed; 260 wounded +350 killed 2,000 killed and wounded
- Location within Lima Battle of Callao (Peru) Battle of Callao (South America)

The Battle of Callao (Spanish: Combate del Dos de Mayo, as it is known in South America) occurred on May 2, 1866, between a Spanish fleet under the command of Admiral Casto Méndez Núñez and the fortified battery emplacements of the Peruvian port city of Callao during the Chincha Islands War. The Spanish fleet bombarded the port of Callao (or El Callao), and eventually withdrew without any notable damage to the city structures, according to the Peruvian and American sources; or after having silenced almost all the guns of the coastal defenses, according to the Spanish accounts and French observers. This proved to be the final battle of the war between Spanish and Peruvian forces.

== Background ==
President Juan Antonio Pezet assumed the presidency of Peru in April 1863, at a time when Spain was making efforts to recover some prestige by recovering its lost colonies in America. Spain began its campaign by seizing the Chincha Islands, which were rich in guano, and demanding indemnity as recompense for the murder of two Spanish citizens in Lambayeque.

Vacillating, President Pezet began removing vast quantities of Peru's guano deposits to give to Spain when Spanish ships threatened Callao and the neighboring coastline. Pezet believed that Peru's naval forces were much too weak to challenge the Spanish fleet. In November 1865, in a moment of nationalism, Colonel Mariano Ignacio Prado seized power from Pezet after a coup, and organized an effective defense against Spanish aggression that culminated with the Battle of Callao.

After the indecisive Battle of Abtao in February 1866, Spanish Admiral Casto Méndez Núñez decided to take punitive action against South American ports, his first target being the undefended Chilean port of Valparaíso. The neutral British and American naval commanders in Chilean waters were unable to prevent this action, and the Spanish bombarded the town and destroyed the Chilean merchant fleet.

Núñez continued afterward for Spain by attacking a strong port and went with his fleet towards the well-defended Peruvian port of Callao. The battle, starting on May 2, was characterized by arduous, long-range combat with ironclads utilized by both sides. Observing the combat were American, British and French ships.

== Battle ==
The Spaniards arrived at Callao, on April 25, with seven warships and seven auxiliary ships carrying 252 guns, most of them (126 pieces) 68-pounder cannons. The Spanish ships included the ironclad Numancia and the steam frigates Reina Blanca, Resolución, Berenguela, Villa de Madrid, Almansa and the armored corvette Vencedora. A V-shaped formation characterized the Spanish fleet, with the smaller ships on the back. This was one of the most formidable fleets that had assembled up to that point in the waters of the American Pacific Ocean.

Prior to the battle, Peruvian president Mariano Ignacio Prado rallied and mobilized the military and the townspeople against Spain. The strong forts and batteries of the stronghold at Callao, which had once repelled Sir Francis Drake and John Hawkins, were reinforced with five heavy British-made 22-ton Blakely rifles. Moreover, four Armstrong guns were placed in two armoured turrets, Junín and La Merced, both protected with a 10-centimetre (3.9 in) thick iron belt. The Armstrong and the Blakely guns were the most potent cannons of the time, and they were a national pride for Peru. In total, the Peruvians had 52 guns and 13 additional guns mounted on the warships Colon, Tumbes, and Sachaca. Also, Peru had two locally built ironclads: The Confederate-style casemated ram ironclad Loa and the monitor Victoria, as well as infantry and cavalry.

The Spanish fleet, forming a V-shaped line of attack, entered into the bay at 10:00 hours, and formed two lines of battle: In the north, the ironclad Numancia and the frigates Almansa and Resolución, while the frigates Villa de Madrid, Berenguela and Reina Blanca moved south. The rest of the fleet, including the corvette Vencedora, remained back near the island of San Lorenzo. The Numancia, one of the largest ships at the time, went forward in order to begin the attack.

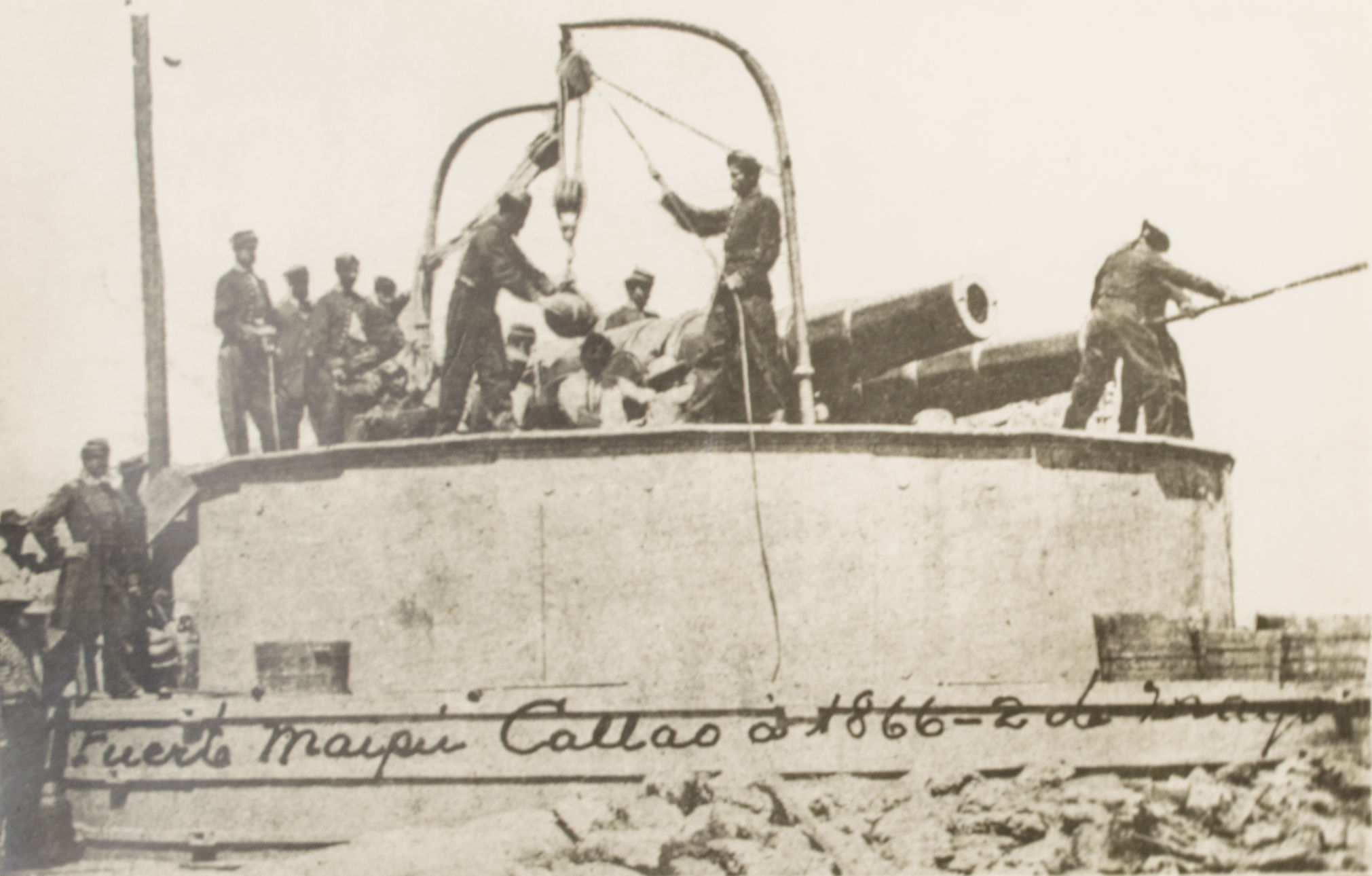
A Callao armored turret, armed with two 300-pound Armstrong guns

At 11:50 hours, the ironclad Numancia opened fire on the defenses. The Peruvian fort Santa Rosa fired back soon after. No shot hit the Spanish warships, so the guns had to be recalibrated; a loss of time that could have been avoided if the Peruvian artillery had begun firing over the Spanish ships while they were taking up positions. When the batteries resumed their fire, a shot hit Numancia, injuring Nuñez. The ship, however, suffered no damage thanks to its armor. The Cañón del Pueblo, a 500-pound Blakely gun, became unusable as the heavy recoil derailed it.

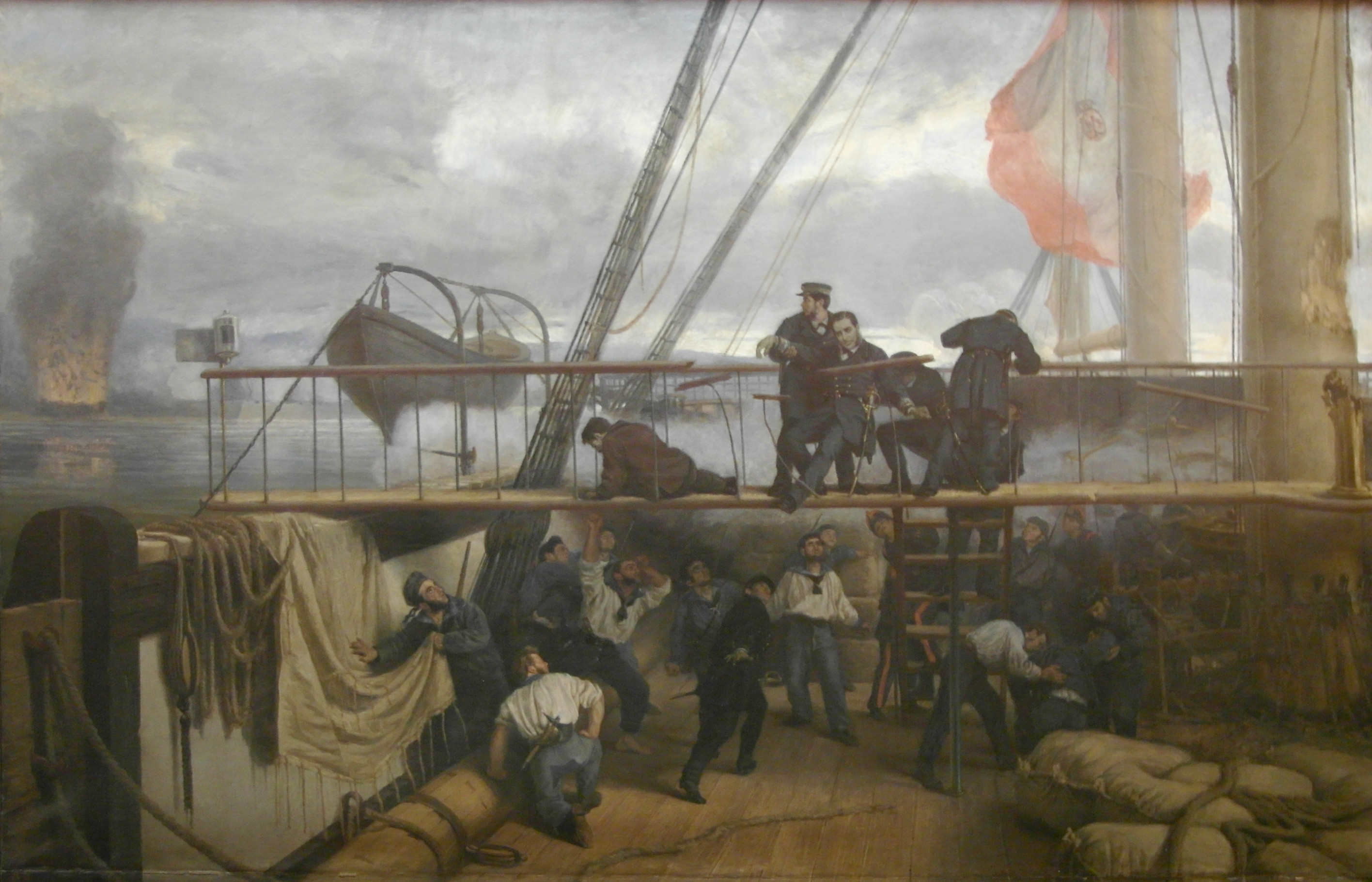
The moment Casto Méndez Núñez was wounded aboard Numancia.

The Spanish frigate Villa de Madrid, meantime, was hit by a Blakely 450-pound projectile, which inflicted 35 casualties and destroyed her boilers. The ship had to be towed out of the battle by the corvette Vencedora, while she fired over 200 shots on the Peruvian forts during the maneuver. Berenguela, pierced side-to-side at the waterline by an Armstrong 300-pound projectile, was also forced to retreat. She had silenced all the Armstrong guns from Junín's armoured turret. Also, the frigate Almansa was hit by another shot at 14:30, resulting in the deaths of 13 crewman and causing an explosion of her powder room, thus forcing her to retreat. Half an hour later, having made the necessary repairs, she returned to her position and resumed the action against the Peruvians.

By this time, there was heavy fire from both sides. A Spanish shot from Blanca hit the armored turret La Merced, destroying it and killing or injuring 93 men, including Peruvian Minister of War and Navy José Gálvez Egúsquiza and colonels Cornelio Borda and Enrique Montes. Chacabuco battery was also affected, losing several cannons and a great number of its volunteer crew, as well as Santa Rosa and Pinchicha forts. In the first one was wounded Ship's captain Muñón, and the second one lost two cannons. In addition, Maipú and Independencia batteries had been completely silenced. The Peruvian sustained then heavy casualties, as many of the 3,000 infantry and cavalry troops present during the battle had been entrenched outside the forts to prevent an alleged Spanish attempt of landing, suffering the gunfire of Numancia, Almansa, Resolución and Vencedora.

At 16:00, having been repelled the small Peruvian fleet under Lizardo Montero, which approached the Spanish twice, only 12 or 14 of Santa Rosa fort guns responded yet to the Spanish fire. One of their shots hit Blanca, killing eight men and injuring Captain Topete. At 17:00, nevertheless, Santa Rosa's guns had been reduced to three. The badly wounded Núñez then ordered the fleet to suspend the fire. The Spanish crews, having sustained heavy damage and it being impossible for them to fight any longer, retreated from the battlefield. The battle was finished. The badly battered Spanish ships remained for several days on San Lorenzo island, taking care of their wounded and their repairs.

== Results ==
On the Spanish side the bombardment was seen as a victory. According to Admiral Méndez Nuñez, almost all of the coastal batteries were silenced during the engagement and only three guns of Santa Rosa's fort were still making fire when the Spanish fleet left the battlefield. He also reported that those last shots were fired without ammunition, which was confirmed by the Captain of the French corvette Venus, who was present during the battle. Shortly after, the French newspaper La Presse published a new portraying the bombardment as a Spanish victory:

The news from Callao, May 9, give the following details about the bombing of this place. On May 2 the Spanish fleet attacked Callao and its formidable batteries armed with 90 guns, among them Armstrong[type]. At the time that the shelling ceased with the day only three Peruvian guns continued their fire. All the armored batteries had been placed out of action. The victorious fleet then ceased its fire, shouting "Long life to the Queen!"

— La Presse, Paris, June 14, 1866.

On early June the news of the victory were celebrated in Spain with great festivities, whose benefits went to the widows and orphans of those who were killed in combat. Méndez Núñez was awarded with the Grand Cross of the Royal and Distinguished Order of Carlos III and was promoted to Lieutenant General. The commanding officers of the ships involved on the combat were also promoted and their crews received double pay. In honor to them, on 20 July 1866, before the Battle of Lissa, the Austrian Admiral Wilhelm von Tegetthoff harangued his crews shouting "Let's imitate the Spanish at Callao!"

On the other hand, the Peruvians celebrated the battle as a victory, claiming that they had stopped the Spanish from trying to re-colonize South America. In a private letter dated on May 3, 1866; an American eyewitness, T.H. Nelson, wrote:

"The damages caused to Callao are barely noticeable. The [Peruvian] batteries occupied the [Spanish] squad so much that there was no time to bombard the city." In fact, after the battle, the hyped up and surprising situation was so big that American and British troops witnessing the battle joined the cheers of "Viva el Perú!"

In 1870, former U.S. general Alvin Peterson Hovey, member of the United States legation to Perú, described the battle as inconclusive but glorious for both countries in a letter to the U.S. Secretary of State Hamilton Fish:

But the battle came on, on the glorious "Dos de Mayo," for so both Spain and Peru call it, and the fleet bore bravely up toward the forts, reaching within three-quarters of a mile. Then, as they were gallantly exchanging shots, two torpedoes exploded and threw columns of water at least 150 feet in the air. The whole Spanish fleet retired and fought at long range for the remainder of the day. Such was the cause of the success or defeat that followed this action, so glorious both to Peru and Spain. On the part of Peru it will be a feast day forever, and on the part of Spain the Duke of Callao claimed his title for this victory!

— Mr. Alvin P. Hovey to Mr. Fish. Lima, Perú, August 22, 1870.

== Aftermath ==
A couple of months after the battle, the famed ironclad ships of the War of the Pacific, Huáscar and Independencia, were added to the Peruvian fleet. While the war still remained without a peace settlement, the Peruvians contemplated the idea of invading the Philippines to ward off the Spanish ships that were in the area. The Peruvian Government hired Commodore John Randolph Tucker, who had outshone himself in the American Civil War fighting for the Confederate States of America. Nonetheless, several Peruvian officers, led by Captain Lizardo Montero, including Miguel Grau Seminario, Aurelio García y García and others felt insulted at such a decision since they felt that they had shown they were just as capable as any other officers to lead and win a naval battle and resigned to their command commissions. At the end, the idea was abandoned, but Tucker found another important job in the exploring and mapping the Peruvian Amazon. This event, along with the fear of a Spanish attack from the Atlantic due to the presence in South American waters of the Spanish frigates Blanca, Resolución, Villa de Madrid, Almansa, Concepción, and Navas de Tolosa along with the capture on August 22 of the unassigned Chilean corvette Tornado by the Spanish frigate Gerona prevented the expedition against the Philippines. The Spanish expedition in the Pacific officially ended in 1868, but the peace was not signed until 1879.

The Callao Square in Madrid and, subsequently, the Callao Metro Madrid station are named after this battle.
