= Manuel Villar Olivera =

Peruvian sailor and military personnel (1801–1889)

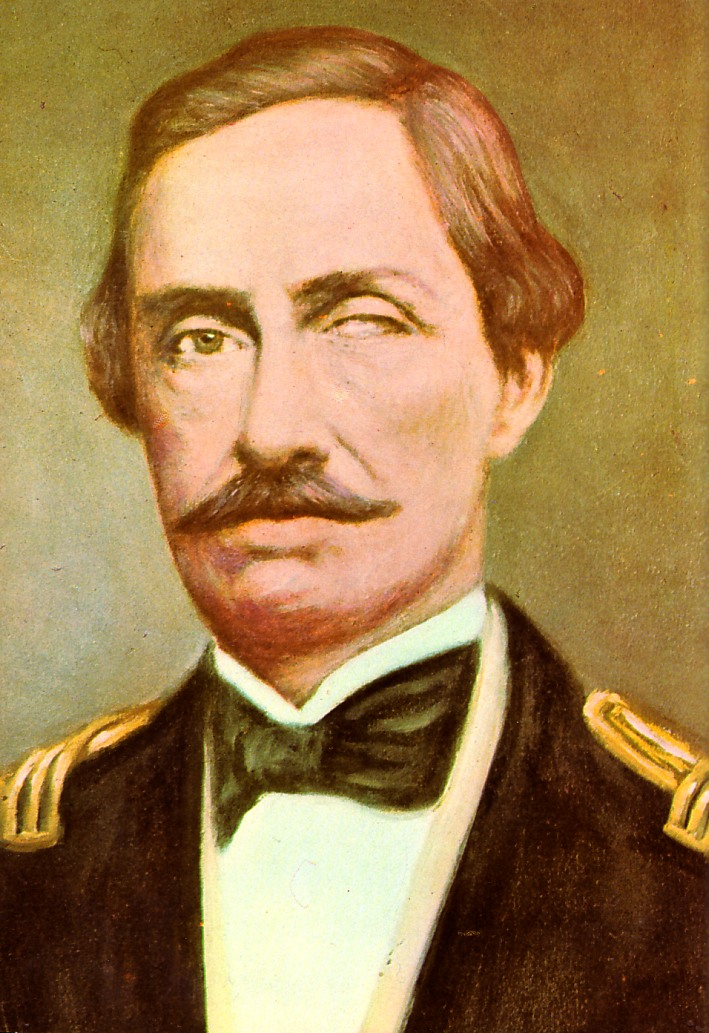
- Born: March 30, 1801; Lima, Viceroyalty of Peru, Spain
- Died: October 6, 1889 (aged 88); Callao, Peru
- Military career
- Allegiance: Peru
- Branch: Peruvian Navy
- Service years: 1820 — 1881
- Rank: Rear Admiral
- Commands: Commander of the Peruvian-Chilean Allied Squad (1866)
- Conflicts: Peruvian War of Independence: Capture of the frigate Esmeralda; Gran Colombia–Peru War: Blockade of Guayaquil; Salaverry-Santa Cruz War; Chincha Islands War: Battle of Abtao; War of the Pacific: Blockade of Callao; Battle of San Juan and Chorrillos

Manuel Villar Olivera (March 30, 1801 – October 6, 1889) was a Peruvian Rear-Admiral who had a long service career in the army of his country, from the Peruvian War of Independence to the War of the Pacific. He is best known for having commanded the Peruvian-Chilean allied squad in the Battle of Abtao, facing the Spanish Pacific Squad during the Chincha Islands War.

== Early years ==
Manuel Villar Olivera was born in the city of Lima, then capital of the Viceroyalty of Peru. He was the son of Pascual Villar, artillery colonel in the Royal Army of Peru, and Agustina Olivera.

He made his first nautical studies at the Royal Nautical Academy of Lima and was admitted as a midshipman in 1819.

== Independence of Peru and war with Spain ==
In 1820 he joined the patriotic army of General José de San Martín, when the liberating expedition arrived on Peruvian shores. At Lord Cochrane's orders, he took part in the Capture of the frigate Esmeralda, the most powerful ship the Spanish had in Callao. He then became part of the nascent Peruvian squad under the command of Martín Guisse, a veteran British officer from the Battle of Trafalgar.

== Naval career ==
After the war with Spain, he made the naval campaign in the north, during the Gran Colombia–Peru War, forming part of the crew of the frigate "Presidente" always in command of Guise. He distinguished himself in the fighting in the Guayaquil Blockade until achieving the capitulation of the port in 1829. Due to his merits, he was promoted to lieutenant of a frigate. In 1834 he was promoted to second lieutenant.

In 1835 he supported General Felipe Santiago Salaverry in the war against Andrés de Santa Cruz. Salaverry was then defeated and shot, and Olivera was eliminated from the military ranks, like many other officers, although shortly afterwards he was reinstated to active service and allowed to continue his military career. He then served the Peru-Bolivian Confederation aboard the brig Flor del Mar and the corvette Socabaya.

After the end of the Confederation in 1839, he was again withdrawn from service, then moving to the merchant marine, until 1847. He sailed along the coasts of China, Australia and Brazil.

In 1853 he was sent to the United States by President José Rufino Echenique to supervise the construction of the Tirado and Huallaga river steamers, with which he returned via the mouth of the Amazon River in 1854, dedicating himself to exploration work in the Peruvian Amazon. After the Battle of La Palma on January 5, 1855, and the overthrow of Echenique, he was once again separated from service.

He rejoined the navy after the aggressive presence of the Spanish Pacific Squadron on the Peruvian coast. On board the Apurímac frigate, he assumed as commander of the Peruvian naval division, which also included the frigate Amazonas and the corvettes América and Unión. Allied with two Chilean ships, it faced the Spanish screw frigates Villa de Madrid and Reina Blanca in the Battle of Abtao which was fought on February 7, 1866. The South American allies celebrated it as a victory, as the Spanish frigates withdrew without being able to break the resistance of the allied fleet. Villar was declared by the Peruvian government “Benemérito de la Patria in heroic and eminent degree” .

In the following years he served as a member of the Boards of Recognition and Reform of Naval Ordinances.

== War of the Pacific ==
At the outbreak of the War of the Pacific, despite being 78 years old, he asked to be given command of Fort Santa Rosa, in Callao. He was appointed Secretary of the Navy by the dictatorial government of Nicolás de Pierola, in January 1880.

He contributed to the preparations for the Lima campaign. On January 5, 1881, he was promoted to Rear Admiral . During the Battle of San Juan and Chorrillos on January 13, 1881, he was in charge of the Morro Solar batteries, where he fought until the last shot was fired.

== Postwar life ==
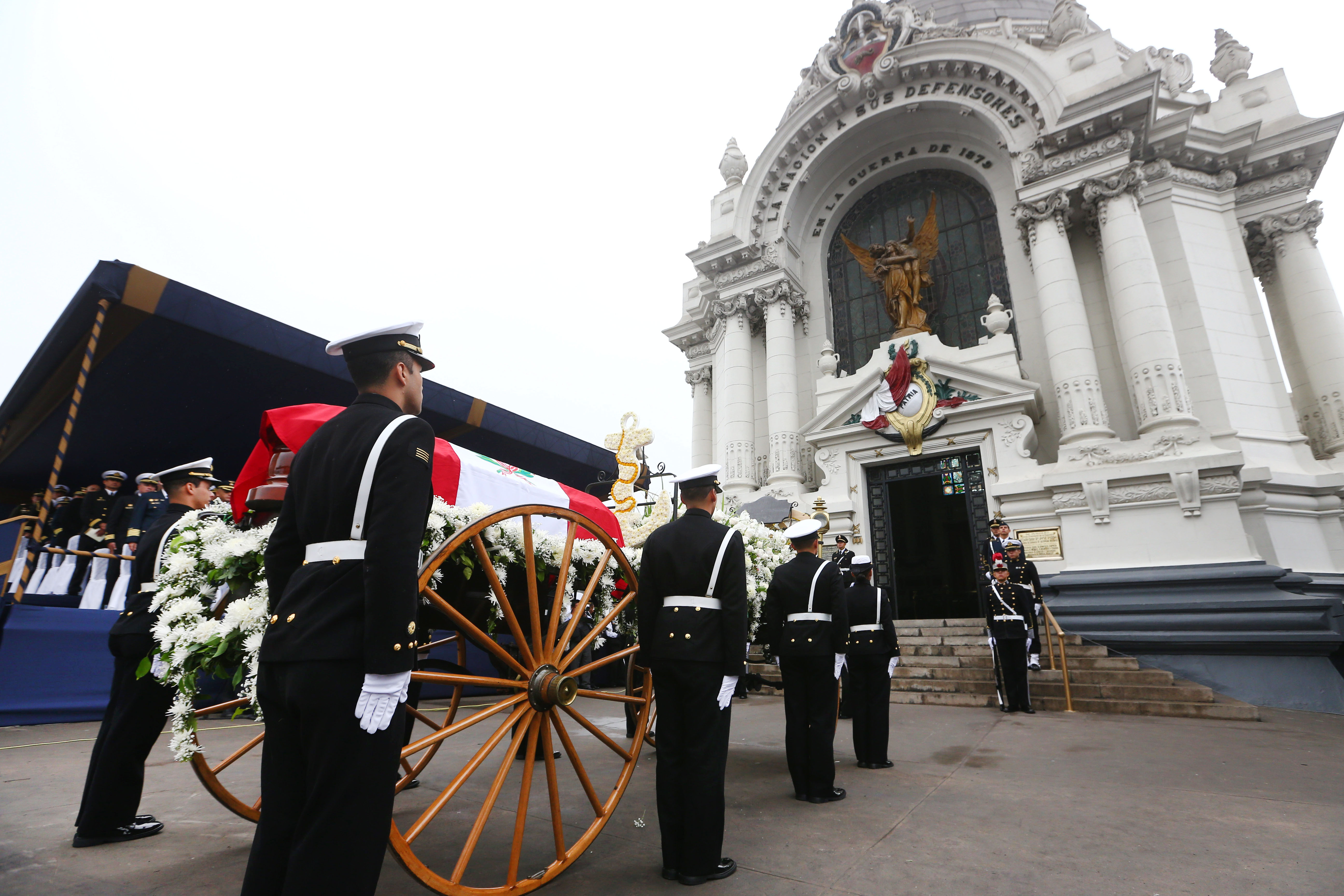
Since June 1, 2017, the remains of Rear Admiral Manuel Villar rest in the Crypt of the Heroes.

He retired from public life and died in Callao in 1889.

His remains rested in the San Gavino 11-C barracks of the Presbítero Maestro Cemetery, until, by Supreme Resolution No. 394-2016-DE of October 21, 2016, they were exhumed and transferred to the Crypt of the Heroes of the Cementerio Presbítero Matías Maestro, a ceremony that took place on June 1, 2017, with the presence of Defense Minister Jorge Nieto Montesinos; the Chief of the Joint Command of the Armed Forces, Admiral José Luis Paredes Lora; military, political and ecclesiastical authorities, as well as descendants and relatives of the hero.
