= Spanish frigate Reina Blanca =

Spanish Navy screw frigate of 1859–1893

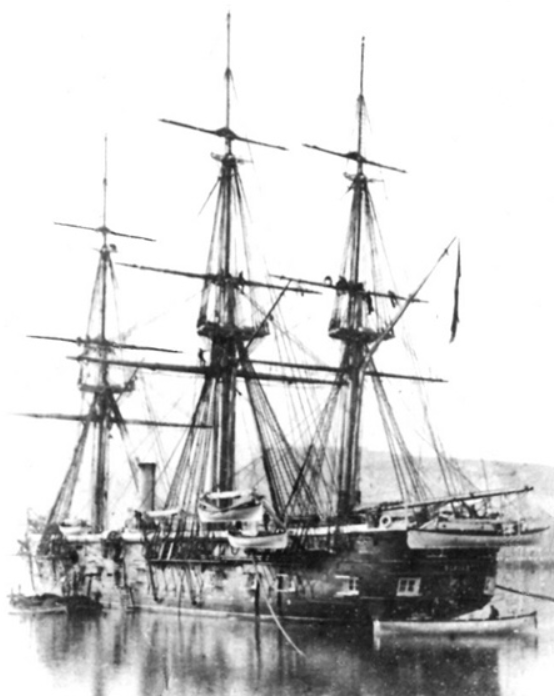

History

Spain
- Name: Reina Blanca
- Namesake: Blanche I of Navarre
- Ordered: 8 October 1853
- Builder: Reales Astilleros de Esteiro, Ferrol, Spain
- Cost: 3,082,909 pesetas
- Laid down: 16 October 1854 or 4 April 1855 (see text)
- Launched: 19 February 1859
- Commissioned: 1859
- Fate: Scrapped 1893

General characteristics
- Type: Screw frigate
- Displacement: 2,600 or 3,800 tonnes (2,600 or 3,700 long tons)
- Length: 64 m (210 ft 0 in)
- Beam: 13 m (42 ft 8 in)
- Height: 7.22 m (23 ft 8 in)
- Depth: 6.35 m (20 ft 10 in)
- Installed power: 360 hp (268 kW) (nominal)
- Propulsion: Mixed sail and steam; One steam engine, one shaft, 234 t (230 lt; 258 st) coal
- Speed: 8 knots (15 km/h; 9.2 mph)
- Complement: As built: 408 officers and enlisted men; 1886: 8 officers, 290–330 enlisted men, 30–40 midshipmen
- Armament: As built: 10 × 200 mm (7.9 in) 68-pounder smoothbore guns; 26 × 160 mm (6.3 in) 32-pounder rifled guns; 6 × bronze guns (for boats); 1872: 21 × 200 mm (7.9 in) smoothbore guns; 4 × 160 mm (6.3 in) rifled guns; 1884: 4 × 120 mm (4.7 in) guns; 2 × 90 mm (3.5 in) guns; 2 × 70 mm (2.8 in) guns; 1 x machine gun

Reina Blanca (English: Queen Blanche), sometimes referred to as Blanca (English: Blanche), was a screw frigate of the Spanish Navy commissioned in 1859. She took part in the Hispano–Moroccan War of 1859–1860, the multinational intervention in Mexico in 1861–1862, several actions during the Chincha Islands War of 1865–1866, and the Third Carlist War in 1874. After service as a training ship during the 1870s and 1880s, she was scrapped in 1893.

Reina Blanca was named for Blanche I of Navarre (1387–1441), who was queen regnant of the Kingdom of Navarre from 1425 to 1441. She also was Queen of Sicily from 1402 to 1409 and regent of the Kingdom of Sicily from 1404 to 1405 and from 1408 to 1415.

== Construction and commissioning ==
Reina Blanca′s construction was authorized along with that of the screw frigates Berenguela and Petronila by a royal order of either 8 August or 8 October 1853 (sources disagree). She was laid down at the Reales Astilleros de Esteiro in Ferrol, Spain, on either 16 October 1854 or 4 April 1855 (sources disagree) as a wooden-hulled screw frigate with mixed sail and steam propulsion. She was launched on 19 February 1859, and after fitting out she was commissioned later in 1859. Her total construction cost was 3,082,909 pesetas.

== Service history ==
=== Early service ===
Reina Blanca put to sea for the first time on 30 November 1859 and operated under the command of either Capitán de navío (Ship-of-the-line captain) Manuel Sibila or Capitán de navío Don Tomás (sources disagree) as part of a Spanish squadron off Morocco during the Hispano–Moroccan War, taking part in blockade operations and shore bombardments. After the war ended in 1860, the squadron disbanded, and Reina Blanca joined the escort of a convoy conveying a Spanish Army force under the command of Generale (General) Juan Prim to the naval base at Havana in the Captaincy General of Cuba. Subsequently operating in the Caribbean under the command of Capitán de fragata (Frigate captain) José Morgado e Iñel, she took part in a naval demonstration off Port-au-Prince, Haiti, by a squadron under the command of Joaquín Gutierrez de Rubalcava in 1861.

Reina Blanca next participated in a multinational intervention in Mexico to settle damage claims in 1861–1862, again as part of a squadron under Gutierrez de Rubalcava. The Spanish ships seized Veracruz on 14 December 1861 and French and British forces arrived in January 1862. Spanish and British forces withdrew from Mexico in 1862 when it became apparent that France intended to seize control of Mexico, and Reina Blanca returned to Cuba. She soon headed home to Spain, where she became a unit of the Training Squadron. When that squadron disbanded in mid-1862, she moved to Cádiz, embarked Generale Felipe Ribero y Lemoine, and returned to the Caribbean, disembarking Ribero at the Captaincy General of Santo Domingo, where he took up his appointment as governor. She then continued on to Havana, which became her base.

=== Chincha Islands War ===
Amid tensions between Spain and her former colonies Chile and Peru, Reina Blanca was reassigned to the Pacific Squadron in 1864. Getting underway from Havana under the command of Capitán de navío (Ship-of-the-Line Captain) Juan Bautista Topete, she moved to Montevideo, Uruguay, where she and the screw frigate Berenguela rendezvoused with the screw frigate Villa de Madrid. The three ships passed through the Strait of Magellan into the Pacific Ocean and reached Pisco, Peru, on 19 December 1864, then joined the Pacific Squadron in the Chincha Islands on 30 December 1864. Villa de Madrid became the flagship of the squadron's commander, Vicealmirante (Vice admiral) José Manuel Pareja, whose predecessor Luis Hernández-Pinzón Álvarez had seized the Chincha Islands from Peru in April 1864. On 27 January 1865 Pareja and a Peruvian government representative, Manuel Ignacio de Vivanco, signed the Preliminary Treaty of Peace and Friendship between Spain and Peru, known informally as the Vivanco–Pareja Treaty, aboard Villa de Madrid in an ultimately unsuccessful attempt to settle claims between the two countries that instead sparked the outbreak of the Peruvian Civil War of 1865.

The political situation in the region further deteriorated during 1865 when Pareja steamed to Valparaíso, Chile, to settle Spanish claims. When Chile refused to settle, Pareja announced a blockade of Chilean ports, with Reina Blanca assigned to the blockade of Caldera. As a result of the blockade, the Chincha Islands War broke out between Spain and Chile on 24 September 1865. The blockade spread the Pacific Squadron thinly among the waters off Chilean ports, and early setbacks in the war culminated in a humiliating Spanish naval defeat in the Battle of Papudo on 26 November 1865 in which the Chilean Navy corvette Esmeralda captured the Spanish Navy schooner Virgen de Covadonga. News of the defeat prompted Pareja to commit suicide aboard Villa de Madrid off Valparaíso, shooting himself in his cabin on 28 November 1865 while lying on his bed wearing his dress uniform. He was buried at sea.

Arriving from Callao, Peru, the armoured frigate Numancia rendezvoused with Villa de Madrid and Berenguela at Caldera, Chile, on 12 December 1865. Learning of Pareja's death, Numancia′s commanding officer, Contralmirante (Counter admiral) Casto Méndez Núñez, took charge of the Pacific Squadron that day and transferred to Villa de Madrid. After meeting with the commanding officers of the squadron's ships, Méndez Núñez departed aboard Villa de Madrid bound for Coquimbo, Chile, where he rendezvoused with Reina Blanca. The two ships got underway on 18 December for Valparaíso, where the screw frigate Resolución and the screw corvette Vencedora and joined them on 19 December 1865, thus concentrating the squadron there. A few days later, Méndez Núñez limited the blockade to Valparaíso and Caldera. After bringing aboard supplies from a newly arrived Spanish frigate, Méndez Núñez's squadron began operations to find and recapture Virgen de Covadonga. The squadron first searched the Juan Fernández Islands and then Puerto Inglés on Chiloé Island in the Chiloé Archipelago off Chile without finding her.

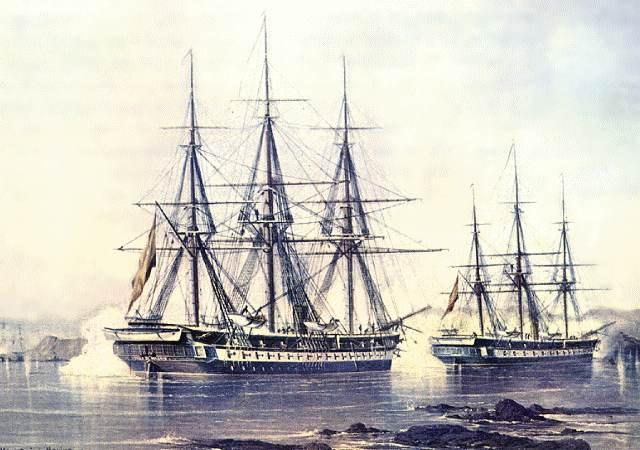
The Spanish screw frigates Reina Blanca and Villa de Madrid during the Battle of Abtao on 7 February 1866.

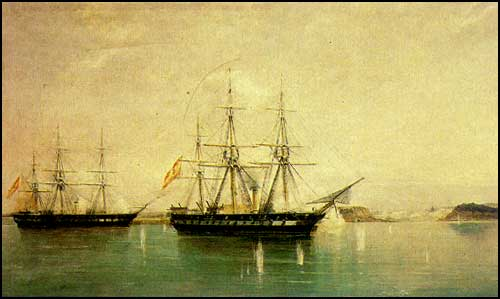
Reina Blanca and Villa de Madrid at the Battle of Abtao on 7 February 1866.

Peru and Ecuador joined the war on Chile's side in January 1866. In February 1866, Méndez Núñez sent Reina Blanca, still under Topete's command, and Villa de Madrid south to destroy the combined Chilean-Peruvian squadron. To save coal, the two frigates stopped at the Juan Fernández Islands to obtain supplies and information before beginning their search. The Spanish frigates found the allied squadron, composed of the Peruvian Navy frigate Apurímac and corvettes América and Unión and the Chilean Navy schooner Covadonga, anchored and immobilized in an inlet on the Chilean coast in the Chiloé Archipelago at Abtao Island on 7 February 1866. In the resulting Battle of Abtao, the Spanish ships were reluctant to close with the allied squadron because of a fear of running aground in shallow water. Apurímac opened fire at 16:15, and an indecisive exchange of long-range gunfire ensued over the course of about 90 minutes in which the ships fired about 1,700 rounds and Covadonga — the captured Virgen de Covadonga, now commissioned into Chilean service and renamed – scored several hits on Reina Blanca. The Spanish frigates displayed good marksmanship but had little success and ultimately withdrew as darkness fell to avoid wasting ammunition. During the engagement, Villa de Madrid was hit seven times in her hull and four times in her masts and rigging, suffering four men wounded and three others accidentally injured; two of her guns burst at their muzzles, although this did not result in any additional damage or casualties. Reina Blanca was hit eight times in her hull and eight in her masts and rigging, suffering two men wounded.

Méndez Núñez decided to make a second attempt at destroying the allied squadron, this time with Reina Blanca and Numancia under his personal command. On 17 February 1866, the two ships left the waters off Valparaíso, where the Pacific Squadron had concentrated, and headed south to the Chiloé Archipelago, where they found that the allied ships had retreated into an inlet on the coast of Calbuco Island. Unable to close with the allied ships because of Numancia′s draft, Méndez Núñez ordered his ships to withdraw. The two Spanish ships anchored at Puerto Low on 27 February, at Puerto Oscuro on 1 March, and in the Gulf of Arauco on 9 March 1866. At some point during these operations – sources disagree on whether it was on 6 March or on the afternoon of 9 March — Reina Blanca captured the Chilean sidewheel paddle steamer Paquete de Maule, which was bound from Lota, Chile, to Montevideo carrying naval personnel assigned to join the crews of the Peruvian ironclad turret ship Huáscar and broadside ironclad Independencia there; sources disagree on the number of personnel aboard, claiming both a total of 134 men and of eight officers and 140 enlisted men. Paquete de Maule had been flying the British flag when Reina Blanca stopped her, and the men aboard her tried to pass themselves off as neutral British civilians, but a suspicious Spanish officer tricked them by calling out an order to them which they obeyed with military discipline, revealing themselves as naval personnel, and the Spanish arrested them. On 10 March, Reina Blanca captured two Chilean barges carrying coal and gunpowder, both much needed by the Spanish squadron. Reina Blanca, Numancia, and their three prizes departed the Gulf of Arauco on 12 March to rejoin the rest of the Pacific Squadron off Valparaíso, Numancia and Paquete de Maule doing so on 14 March and Reina Blanca and the two barges arriving on 15 March. Chilean authorities offered to exchange Spanish civilians held in Chile for the men captured aboard Paquete de Maule, but Méndez Núñez turned the offer down. He hoped to exchange his captives for the Spaniards captured aboard Virgen de Covadonga, but the Chileans refused.

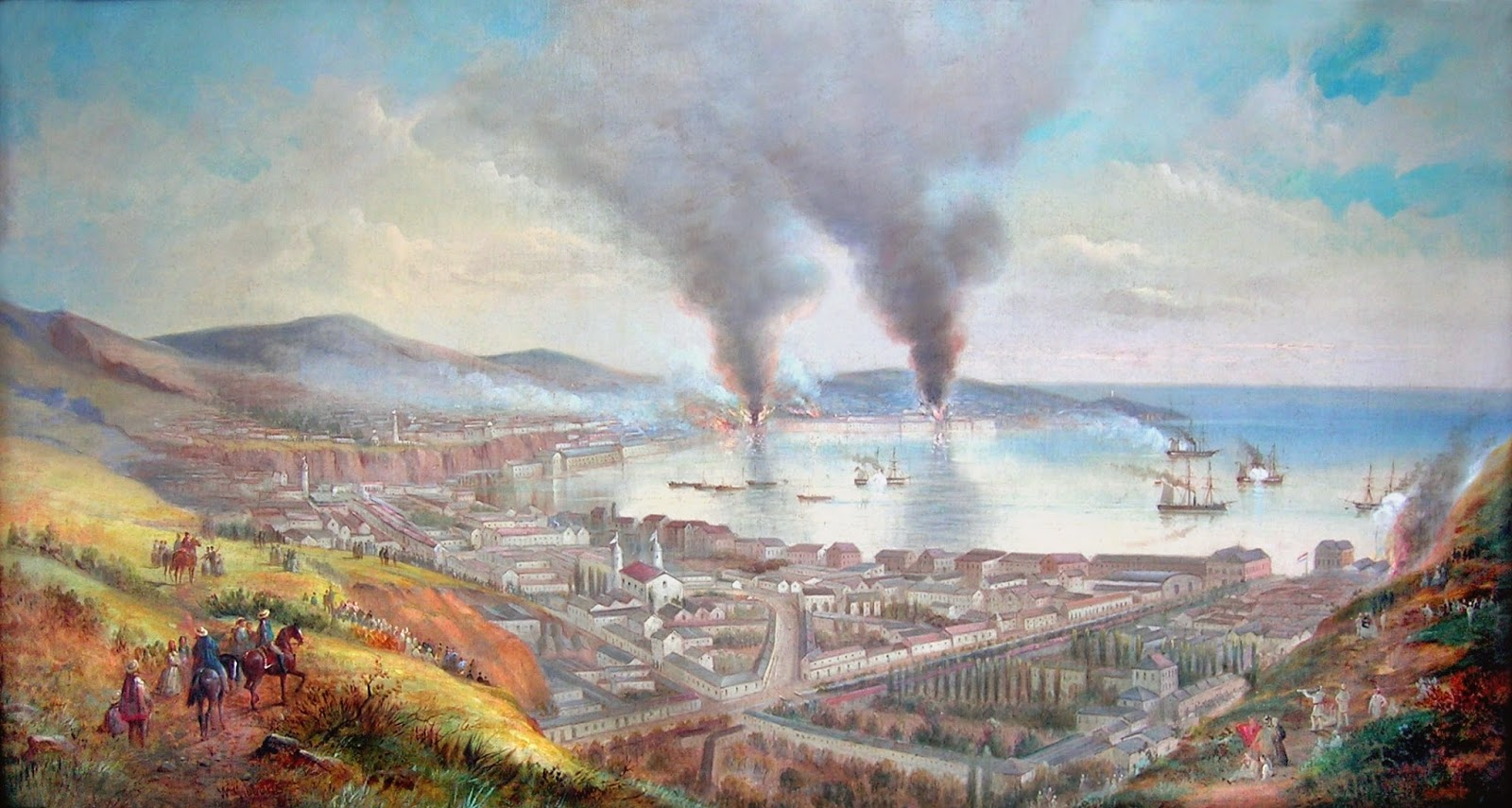
Valparaíso Chile during the bombardment by the admiral Méndez Núñez. (Painting by William Gibbons, ca. 1870)

Bolivia joined the war against Spain on 22 March 1866, closing all the Pacific ports of South America south of Colombia to Spanish ships. Under orders to take punitive action against South American ports, Méndez Núñez selected undefended Valparaíso as his target, although he found the idea of attacking an undefended port repugnant. On the morning of 31 March 1866 his squadron arrived at Valparaíso. Numancia fired two shots to signal the rest of the squadron to open fire at 09:00, then withdrew to a rearward position and took no further part in the bombardment. Facing no opposition, Reina Blanca, Villa de Madrid, the screw frigate Resolución, and the screw corvette Vencedora conducted a three-hour bombardment of Valparaíso while Berenguela and the sidewheel paddle steamer Paquete de Maule stood by offshore to guard against any attempt at escape by Chilean merchant ships. By the time it ended at 12:00, the bombardment had killed two people, injured 10, and sunk 33 merchant ships in the harbor, destroying Chile's merchant fleet. It inflicted US$10 million (equivalent to about US$224 million in 2011) in damage.

Méndez Núñez chose the heavily defended port of Callao, Peru, for his next attack. He divided the squadron into two divisions, the first made up of Berenguela, Numancia, Reina Blanca, Vencedora, and three auxiliary steamers and the second of Villa de Madrid, Resolución, the screw frigate Almansa, Paquete de Maule, and three transport frigates and, after burning prize ships his squadron had captured, set off on 14 April 1866 for San Lorenzo Island off Callao, the second division getting underway at 09:00 and the first division at 16:00. The first division made the voyage under steam and arrived at San Lorenzo Island on 25 April, while the second division, making the journey under sail and delayed by the low speed of one of the transport frigates, arrived on 27 April 1866. Several days of negotiations began on 26 April, during which Méndez Núñez granted neutral countries a four-day delay in his attack to give them time to salvage their interests in Callao. The Spanish ships used the delay to prepare for the attack: The frigates all lowered their topmasts and main yards and altered their rigging to reduce the likelihood of damage to their masts, set up on-board field hospitals, and painted over the white stripes on their hulls with black paint to reduce the ships' visibility and give Peruvian gunners less of an aiming point. Reina Blanca also mounted heavy chains along her hull amidships to provide protection for her engine room.

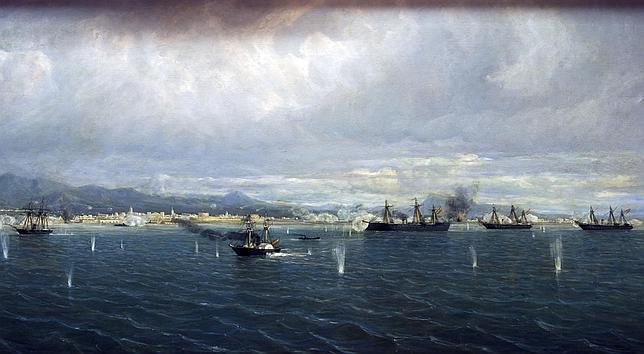
The 19th-century painting The Battle of Callao by Rafael Monleón y Torres (1843–1900). Numancia is at center.

On the morning of 2 May 1866 the Spanish ships entered Callao Bay, beginning the Battle of Callao, the largest battle of the Chincha Islands War. Vencedora and the auxiliary ships stood off near San Lorenzo Island while the other six Spanish ships attacked Callao, with Numancia, Almansa, and Resolución assigned to bombard the northern part of the harbor while Reina Blanca, Berenguela, and Villa de Madrid shelled the southern part. Numancia fired the first shot at 11:55, and soon all the Spanish ships were exchanging fire with the Peruvian fortifications. Observing what he judged to be poor marksmanship on the part of the Peruvian gunners because of the difficulty they had in depressing their guns sufficiently to fire at Reina Blanca, her commanding officer, Topete, ordered her to close to within 800 metres (870 yd) of the Peruvian fortifications, where the Peruvian coastal artillery would have even greater difficulty in firing at her while she could return fire with greater accuracy. At 12:10, a shell the Spanish credited to Reina Blanca penetrated La Merced, the southern armored gun turret of Callao's defenses, detonating its gunpowder stores in an explosion that blew it to pieces, killing 93 men, including Peru's Minister of War and Navy, José Gálvez Egúsquiza. After suffering hits in her hull, masts, and rigging and with Topete wounded, Reina Blanca ran out of ammunition at 15:00 and withdrew from the firing line. Running low on ammunition, the Spanish squadron ceased fire entirely at 16:40 as dusk fell and fog began to form in the harbor; by then all but three guns of the harbor defenses had been silenced.

Méndez Núñez's squadron spent the next several days at San Lorenzo Island, making repairs and tending to casualties. The Chincha Islands War ended in a ceasefire on 9 May 1866, and on 10 May 1866, Mendez Núñez's squadron burned and scuttled Paquete de Maule near San Lorenzo Island and departed. Deeming Berenguela and Numancia too badly damaged to saefly pass around Cape Horn in winter. Méndez Núñez divided the squadron, sending Berenguela, Numancia, Vencedora, and three auxiliary ships westward across the Pacific to the Philippines in the Spanish East Indies, where Berenguela and Numancia could undergo repairs, while he led the rest of the ships on a voyage eastward around Cape Horn to Rio de Janeiro, Brazil, with Villa de Madrid as his flagship. The ships rounded Cape Horn in winter, and by the time Reina Blanca had made port at Rio de Janeiro on the afternoon of 27 June 1866, 21 members of her crew had died of scurvy.

After arriving at Rio de Janeiro, the squadron began patrols in the South Atlantic while Méndez Núñez took measures to address the needs of his own squadron and indiscipline at the Spanish Navy's Río de la Plata station. The arrival of the screw frigates Concepción and Navas de Tolosa finally allowed Méndez Núñez to release those of his ships in the poorest condition — Reina Blanca, Resolución, and Villa de Madrid — to return to Spain. Reina Blanca got underway from Rio de Janeiro on 6 September 1866 and reached Spain on 18 October 1866, arriving at Ferrol. She underwent careening and repairs there.

=== Later service ===
With her repairs complete, Reina Blanca returned to South America, where she again became part of Méndez Núñez's South American Squadron. Late in 1868, Méndez Núñez relinquished command of the squadron to Contraalmirante (Counteradmiral) Miguel Lobo y Malagamba, who made Reina Blanca his flagship on 6 November 1868. On 20 November 1868, Reina Blanca and the Spanish screw frigate Concepción departed Rio de Janeiro for a voyage to Santa Catalina Island in the Caribbean Sea off Colombia, which they reached on 28 November. On the night of 11–12 December 1868 they again got underway from Rio de Janeiro and stopped at Maldonado, Uruguay, from 18 to 20 December before arriving at Montevideo later on 20 December 1868. They returned to Rio de Janeiro in early May 1869. Uprisings in Uruguay soon led to a civil war, the Revolution of the Lances of 1870–1872, during which the ships of the Spanish South American squadron protected Spanish citizens, interests, and property in Uruguay. Reina Blanca returned to Spain in 1872 and underwent modifications to her armament, leaving her with twenty 200-millimetre (7.9 in) guns in her battery, one 200-millimetre (7.9 in) gun in her bow, and four 160-millimetre (6.3 in) rifled guns on her quarterdeck.

In March 1874 Reina Blanca was assigned to the Fuerzes Navales del Norte (Northern Naval Forces), with which she fought along Spain's northern coast against Carlist forces in the Third Carlist War until June 1874, conducting bombardments of Santurce, Algorta, and Carlist positions in San Pedro Abanto on 25 March; Santurce, Portugalete, Las Arenas, and Carlist forces in the surroundings of Ciérvana on 26 March; Santurce, Portugalete, and Las Arenas on 27 March; and Ciérvana on 28 March. She also helped to lift a two-month siege of Bilbao that lasted from April to June 1874.

Reina Blanca became a training ship later in 1874. On 29 October 1875 she embarked on a midshipman training cruise that included visits to Ferrol, Vigo, and Cádiz in Spain, Las Palmas on Gran Canaria in the Canary Islands, and several ports in the Mediterranean Sea. While anchored at Santander in July 1876, she was dressed overall to welcome the deposed Queen regnant Isabella II, who returned to Spain after almost eight years in exile in France.

In 1877, Reina Blanca was assigned to the Training Squadron. On 25 September 1877, King Alfonso XII of Spain began a series of voyages aboard Numancia, escorted by Reina Blanca, the armored frigate Vitoria, and the screw corvette Africa. During these voyages, the ships visited Alicante, Valencia, Tarragona, Barcelona, Roses, Mahón, Palma de Mallorca, Santa Pola, Almería, and Málaga.

A new Training Squadron formed on 10 November 1878, and Reina Blanca was assigned to it. The squadron disbanded on 8 May 1879. In October 1879, Reina Blanca, Villa de Madrid, the screw corvette Tornado, and the paddle steamer Isabella de Católica escorted Numancia as Numancia transported Alfonso XII and Queen Maria Christina from Cartagena to Cádiz.

Reina Blanca′s armament was altered again in 1884, becoming two Armstrong and two Krupp 120-millimetre (4.7 in) guns in her battery, two 90-millimetre (3.5 in) and two 70-millimetre (2.8 in) Hontoria guns on her quarterdeck, and a machine gun. In 1886 she was chosen for a midshipman cruise to Northern Europe, and underwent alterations at the Arsenal de Cartagena in which her poop cabin was modified to provide accommodation for the midshipmen, the yards were removed from her mizzen, leaving her rigged as a brig, and electric lighting was installed, among other things. Her crew was reduced to eight officers, between 290 and 330 enlisted men, and 30 to 40 midshipmen. She began the cruise on 21 June 1886, called at Plymouth, England, and visited Norway and Sweden before suffering a major mechanical breakdown and putting in at Portsmouth, England. She visited Cherbourg and Brest in France before returning to Spain, arriving at Ferrol on 27 August 1886 and then moving on to Cartagena.

In January 1887, Reina Blanca transported the Spanish minister plenipotentiary, Jose Diosdado y Castillo, to Tangier. At the beginning of February 1887, she called at Barcelona and then proceeded to Toulon, France, with Spanish Minister of the Navy Rafael Rodríguez de Arias Villavicencio on board to attend the launching of the new Spanish Navy battleship Pelayo on 5 February 1887. After several voyages along the coast of France, she arrived in the Balearic Islands. She then got underway from Alcúdia for a voyage to Algiers. In August 1887 she transported a Spanish delegation from Tangier to Rabat, Morocco, where Sultan Hassan I was in residence. On 20 May 1888 she was among the Spanish Navy ships at Barcelona for the opening of the 1888 Barcelona Universal Exposition, serving as flagship of Carlos Valcarcel Ussel de Guimbarda, the Captain General of the Maritime Department of Cartagena.

== Decommissioning and disposal ==
Reina Blanca subsequently was decommissioned and hulked as a pontoon at Cartagena. She was scrapped in 1893.

== Commemoration ==
The masts of the Spanish Navy training ship Juan Sebastián de Elcano, a barquentine that entered service in 1928, are named for previous Spanish Navy training ships. Her foremast is named "Blanca" to commemorate Reina Blanca.
