= Reina Blanca =

Reina Blanca (Spanish for "Queen Blanche") may refer to:

- Blanche I of Navarre (1387–1441), Queen of Navarre (1425–1441), Queen of Sicily (1402–1409), and regent of Sicily (1404–1405 and 1408–1415)
- Spanish frigate Reina Blanca, a Spanish Navy screw frigate commissioned in 1859 and scrapped in 1893
