= Spanish frigate Villa de Madrid =

Spanish Navy screw frigate of 1863–1882

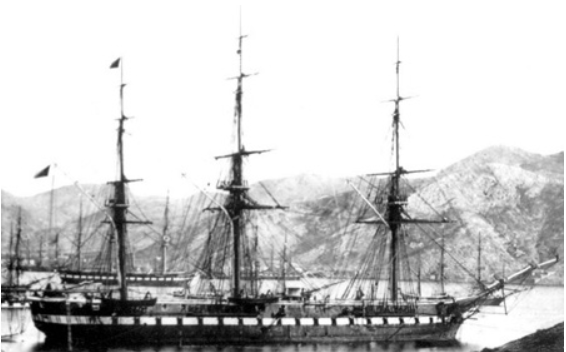

History

Spain
- Name: Villa de Madrid (secular); Nuestra Señora de Atocha (devotional)
- Namesake: Dos de Mayo Uprising in Madrid (secular); Our Lady of Atocha (devotional)
- Ordered: 30 September 1860
- Builder: Arsenal de la Carraca, San Fernando, Spain
- Cost: 5,636,975 pesetas
- Laid down: 3 November 1860
- Launched: 7 October 1862
- Commissioned: 12 November 1863
- Decommissioned: 1884
- Fate: Scrapped 1884

General characteristics
- Type: Screw frigate
- Displacement: 4,478 tonnes (4,407 long tons)
- Length: 87.05 m (285 ft 7 in)
- Beam: 15.42 m (50 ft 7 in)
- Draft: 7.40 m (24 ft 3 in)
- Depth: 7.84 m (25 ft 9 in)
- Installed power: 800 hp (597 kW) (nominal); 3,200 hp (2,386 kW) (effective)
- Propulsion: 2 Penn & Son steam engines, 6 boilers, 1 shaft, 720 t (710 lt; 720 st) coal
- Speed: 15 knots (28 km/h; 17 mph)
- Complement: 617
- Armament: As built: 30 × 200 mm (7.9 in) smoothbore guns; 14 × 160 mm (6.3 in) rifled guns; 2 × 150 mm (5.9 in) howitzers (for boats); 2 x 120 mm (4.7 in) rifled guns (for launches); 2 × 80 mm (3.1 in) rifled guns (for boats); 1869: 34 × 200 mm (7.9 in) smoothbore guns; 6 × 160 mm (6.3 in) rifled guns

Villa de Madrid (English: City of Madrid), also known by the devotional name Nuestra Señora de Atocha (English: Our Lady of Atocha), was a screw frigate of the Spanish Navy commissioned in 1863. She took part in several actions during the Chincha Islands War in 1866. She served on the rebel side during the Glorious Revolution of 1868, and her crew supported the cantonalist government of the Canton of Cartagena during the Cantonal rebellion of 1873–1874. She was decommissioned and scrapped in 1884.

== Names ==
The name Villa de Madrid translates into English as "City of Madrid." However, the ship's name had a more specific historical meaning, honoring the Dos de Mayo (Second of May) Uprising in Madrid against occupying forces of the First French Empire on 2–3 May 1808.

The custom at the time of Villa de Madrid′s commissioning was that any Spanish Navy ship with a non-religious name had to carry an additional name that was religious in nature. Villa de Madrid thus also bore the devotional name Nuestra Señora de Atocha (English: Our Lady of Atocha), referring to a lost icon from a chapel discovered in high esparto (also known as atocha) grass during the Reconquista.

== Construction and commissioning ==
Villa de Madrid′s construction was authorized by a royal order of 30 September 1860. Designed by the Spanish Navy engineer Juan Garcia Lomas, she was laid down at the Arsenal de la Carraca in San Fernando, Spain, on 3 November 1860 as a wooden-hulled screw frigate of mixed construction with iron beams, booms, and diagonals and steam propulsion. On 5 October 1862, the first attempt at launching her failed, but she was launched successfully on 7 October 1862 in the presence of Queen regnant Isabella II.

Villa de Madrid's fitting-out followed, and between 17 March and 15 July 1863 her machinery was installed and her bottom was lined with copper. Her sea trials took place on 6 November 1863, and she was commissioned on 12 November 1863 under the command of Capitán de navío (Ship-of-the-line captain) Claudio Alvargonzález y Sánchez. Her figurehead bore the municipal coat of arms of Madrid, and her total construction cost was 5,636,975 pesetas.

Villa de Madrid's 200-millimetre (7.9 in) smoothbore guns were mounted in a battery. Her 160-millimetre (6.3 in) rifled guns were mounted fore and aft, with six in her forecastle and eight on her afterdeck. She also carried two 120-millimetre (4.7 in) rifled guns for use aboard her launches and two 150-millimetre (5.9 in) howitzers and two short 80-millimetre (3.1 in) rifled guns for use aboard her other boats.

The Spanish Navy viewed Villa de Madrid's design as successful and made plans to build five sister ships to the same design, but dropped these plans as it became apparent that armored frigates were taking the place of wooden ships in major navies.

== Service history ==
=== Early service ===
Villa de Madrid's first operation after commissioning was to carry a Spanish Marine Infantry unit, the 6th Marine Infantry Battalion, from Spain to Havana in the Captaincy General of Cuba, after which she returned to Spain, arriving at Cádiz. Amid tensions between Spain, Chile, and Peru, she departed Cadiz soon afterward, getting underway on 6 September 1864 for duty with the Pacific Squadron. After a transatlantic crossing, she arrived at Montevideo, Uruguay, where she rendezvoused with the Spanish Navy screw frigates Reina Blanca and Berenguela. The three ships then passed through the Strait of Magellan into the Pacific Ocean and reached Pisco, Peru, on 19 December 1864. The three ships joined the Pacific Squadron in the Chincha Islands on 30 December 1864. Villa de Madrid became the flagship of the squadron's commander, Vicealmirante (Vice Admiral) José Manuel Pareja, whose predecessor Luis Hernández-Pinzón Álvarez had seized the Chincha Islands from Peru in April 1864. On 27 January 1865 a Peruvian government representative, Manuel Ignacio de Vivanco, and Pareja signed the Preliminary Treaty of Peace and Friendship between Peru and Spain, known informally as the Vivanco–Pareja Treaty, aboard Villa de Madrid in an ultimately unsuccessful attempt to settle claims between the two countries that instead sparked the outbreak of the Peruvian Civil War of 1865.

=== Chincha Islands War ===
The political situation in the region further deteriorated during 1865 when Pareja steamed to Valparaíso, Chile, to settle Spanish claims. When Chile refused to settle, Pareja announced a blockade of Chilean ports, and the Chincha Islands War broke out between Spain and Chile on 24 September 1865. Early setbacks in the war culminating in a humiliating Spanish naval defeat in the Battle of Papudo on 26 November 1865 — in which the Chileans captured the Spanish Navy schooner Virgen de Covadonga — prompted Pareja to commit suicide aboard Villa de Madrid off Valparaíso, shooting himself in his cabin on 28 November 1865 while lying on his bed wearing his dress uniform. In his testament, he requested not to be buried in Chilean waters; accordingly, he was buried on the high seas.

Arriving from Callao, Peru, the armoured frigate Numancia rendezvoused with Villa de Madrid and Berenguela at Caldera, Chile, on 12 December 1865. Learning of Pareja's death, Numancia′s commanding officer, Contralmirante (Counter admiral) Casto Méndez Núñez, took charge of the Pacific Squadron that day and transferred to Villa de Madrid. After meeting with the commanding officers of the squadron's ships, Méndez Núñez departed aboard Villa de Madrid bound for Coquimbo, Chile, where he rendezvoused with Reina Blanca. The two ships got underway on 18 December for Valparaíso, where the screw frigate Resolución and the screw corvette Vencedora joined them on 19 December 1865, thus concentrating the squadron there. A few days later, Méndez Núñez limited the blockade to Valparaíso and Caldera. After bringing aboard supplies from a newly arrived Spanish frigate, Méndez Núñez's squadron began operations to find and recapture Virgen de Covadonga. The squadron first searched the Juan Fernández Islands and then Puerto Inglés on Chiloé Island in the Chiloé Archipelago off Chile without finding her.

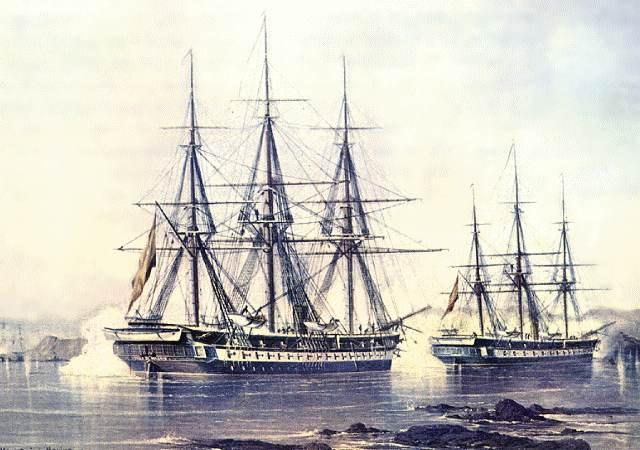
The Spanish screw frigates Reina Blanca and Villa de Madrid during the Battle of Abtao on 7 February 1866.

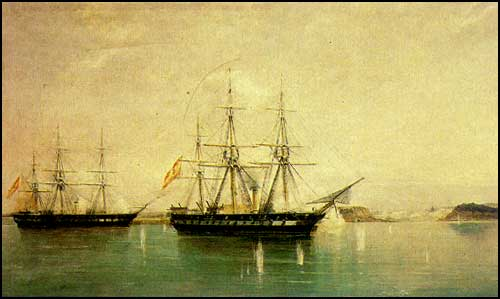
Reina Blanca and Villa de Madrid at the Battle of Abtao on 7 February 1866.

Peru and Ecuador joined the war on Chile's side in January 1866. In February 1866, Méndez Núñez sent Villa de Madrid, still under Sánchez's command, and Reina Blanca south to destroy the combined Chilean-Peruvian squadron. To save coal, the two frigates stopped at the Juan Fernández Islands to obtain supplies and information before beginning their search. The Spanish frigates found the allied squadron, composed of the Peruvian Navy frigate Apurímac and corvettes América and Unión and the Chilean Navy schooner Covadonga, anchored and immobilized in an inlet on the Chilean coast in the Chiloé Archipelago at Abtao Island on 7 February 1866. In the resulting Battle of Abtao, the Spanish ships were reluctant to close with the allied squadron because of a fear of running aground in shallow water. Apurímac opened fire at 16:15, and an indecisive exchange of long-range gunfire ensued over the course of about 90 minutes in which the ships fired about 1,700 rounds and Covadonga scored several hits on Reina Blanca. The Spanish frigates displayed good marksmanship but had little success and ultimately withdrew as darkness fell to avoid wasting ammunition. During the engagement, Villa de Madrid was hit seven times in her hull and four times in her masts and rigging, suffering four men wounded and three others accidentally injured; two of her guns burst at their muzzles, although this did not result in any additional damage or casualties. Reina Blanca was hit eight times in her hull and eight in her masts and rigging, suffering two men wounded.

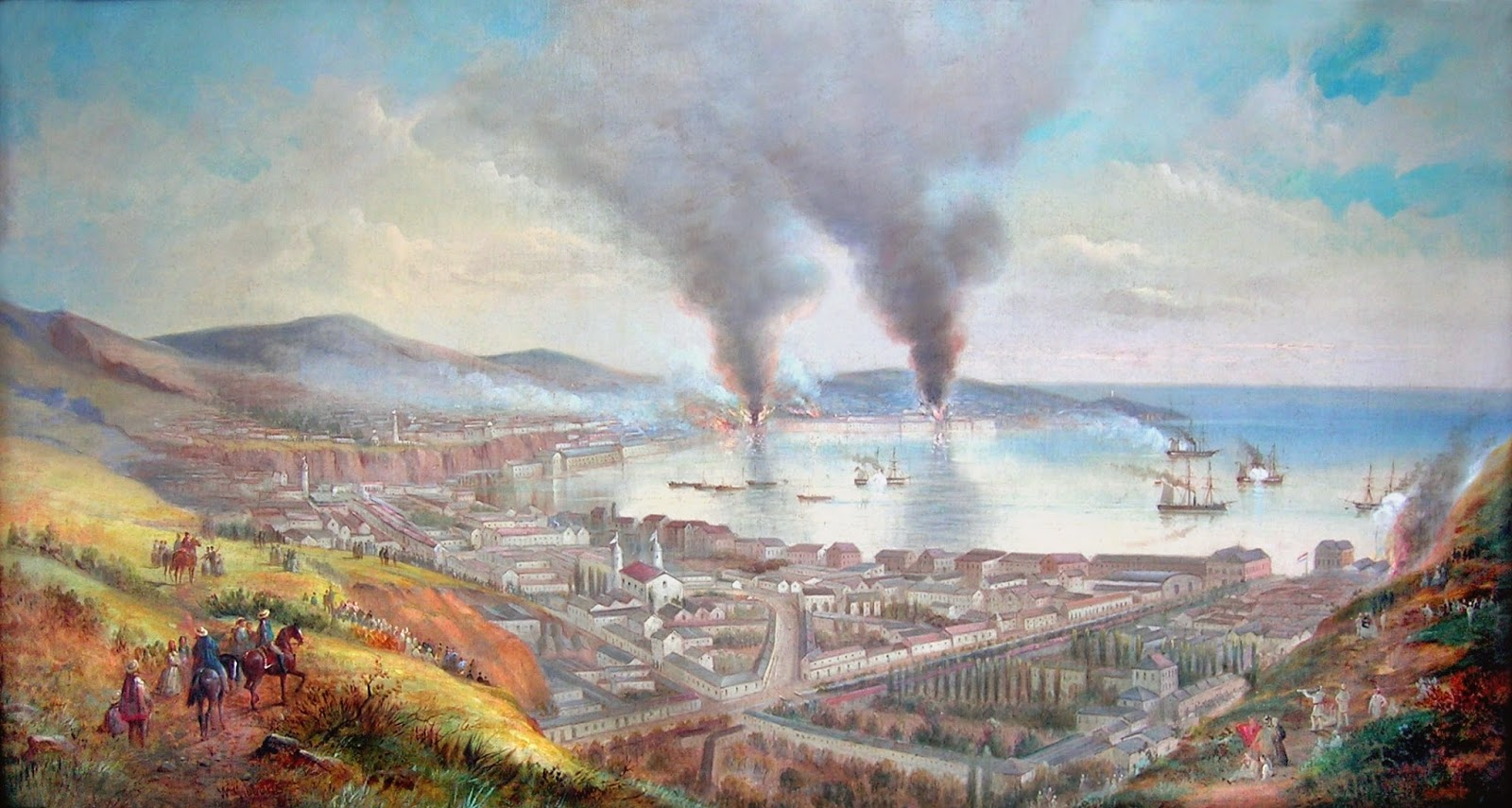
Valparaíso Chile during the bombardment by the admiral Méndez Núñez. (Painting by William Gibbons, ca. 1870)

Bolivia joined the war against Spain on 22 March 1866, closing all the Pacific ports of South America south of Colombia to Spanish ships. Under orders to take punitive action against South American ports, Méndez Núñez selected undefended Valparaíso as his targettarget, although he found the idea of attacking an undefended port repugnant. On the morning of 31 March 1866 his squadron arrived at Valparaíso. Numancia fired two shots at 08:00 to signal the rest of the squadron to open fire, then withdrew offshore and took no further part in the bombardment, instead standing by to intervene if foreign warships, which had gathered near the harbor entrance, tried to interfere. Facing no opposition, Villa de Madrid, Reina Blanca, Resolución, and Vencedora began a three-hour bombardment of Valparaíso at 09:00 while Berenguela and the sidewheel paddle steamer Paquete de Maule stood by offshore to guard against any attempt at escape by Chilean merchant ships. By the time it ended at 12:00, the bombardment had killed two people, injured 10, and sunk 33 merchant ships in the harbor, destroying Chile's merchant fleet. It inflicted US$10 million (about US$224 million in 2011) in damage.

Méndez Núñez chose the heavily defended port of Callao, Peru, for his next attack. He divided the squadron into two divisions, the first made up of Berenguela, Numancia, Reina Blanca, Vencedora, and three auxiliary steamers and the second of Villa de Madrid, Resolución, the screw frigate Almansa, Paquete de Maule, and three transport frigates and, after burning prize ships his squadron had captured, set off on 14 April 1866 for San Lorenzo Island off Callao, the second division getting underway at 09:00 and the first division at 16:00. The first division made the voyage under steam and arrived at San Lorenzo Island on 25 April, while the second division, making the journey under sail and delayed by the low speed of one of the transport frigates, arrived on 27 April 1866. Several days of negotiations began on 26 April, during which Méndez Núñez granted neutral countries a four-day delay in his attack to give them time to salvage their interests in Callao. The Spanish ships used the delay to prepare for the attack: The frigates all lowered their topmasts and main yards and altered their rigging to reduce the likelihood of damage to their masts, set up on-board field hospitals, and painted over the white stripes on their hulls with black paint to reduce the ships' visibility and give Peruvian gunners less of an aiming point.

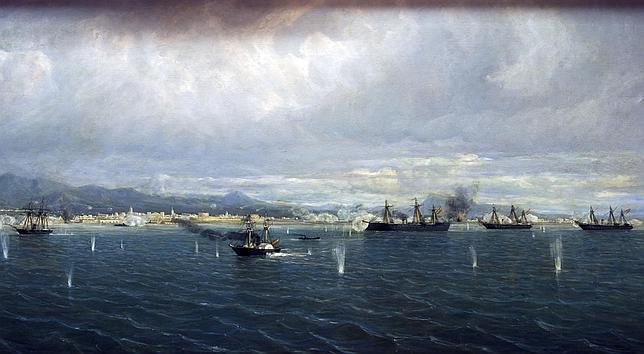
The 19th-century painting The Battle of Callao by Rafael Monleón y Torres (1843–1900). Numancia is at center.

On the morning of 2 May 1866 the Spanish ships entered Callao Bay, beginning the Battle of Callao, the largest battle of the Chincha Islands War. Vencedora and the auxiliary ships stood off near San Lorenzo Island while the other six Spanish ships attacked Callao, with Numancia, Almansa, and Resolución assigned to bombard the northern part of the harbor while Villa de Madrid, Berenguela, and Reina Blanca shelled the southern part. Numancia fired the first shot at 11:55. During the ensuing battle, Villa de Madrid was hit five times, including a hit by a 450-pound (204 kg) projectile that according to one source killed 14 men and wounded 13 and according to another inflicted a total of 35 casualties. The projectile destroyed her boilers and disabled her. Vencedora towed her out of danger, but Villa de Madrid fired over 200 rounds at the Peruvian fortifications during the maneuver. In command of a battery of guns on Villa de Madrid′s main deck, Teniente de navío (Ship-of-the-line lieutenant) Manuel de la Cámara, a future almirante (admiral), played an active and conspicuous role in the battle, the guns under his command firing until they ran out of ammunition. Running low on ammunition, the Spanish squadron ceased fire entirely at 16:40 as dusk fell and fog began to form in the harbor; by then all but three guns of the harbor defenses had been silenced. The most significant combat action of Villa de Madrid′s career, the Battle of Callao coincidentally took place on the 58th anniversary of the Madrid uprising for which she was named.

Méndez Núñez's squadron spent the next several days at San Lorenzo Island just off Callao, making repairs and tending to casualties. The Chincha Islands War ended in a ceasefire on 9 May 1866, Villa de Madrid having suffered a total of 74 men dead or wounded during the war. On 10 May 1866, Mendez Núñez's squadron burned and scuttled Paquete de Maule and departed South American waters. Mendez Núñez viewed an eastward passage around Cape Horn in winter as too dangerous for his damaged ships, so he decided to steam west across the Pacific Ocean. He divided the squadron, sending Berenguela, Numancia, Vencedora, and three auxiliary ships westward to the Philippines in the Spanish East Indies for repairs while he led the rest of the ships on a voyage eastward around Cape Horn to Rio de Janeiro, Brazil, with Villa de Madrid as his flagship. Villa de Madrid passed around Cape Horn under sail in winter without warm clothing or fresh food, and scurvy broke out among her crew. By the time the squadron made port at Rio de Janeiro on 24 June 1866, 31 members of Villa de Madrid′s crew had died and 350 more were sick.

After arriving at Rio de Janeiro, the squadron began patrols in the South Atlantic while Méndez Núñez took measures to address the needs of his own squadron and indiscipline at the Spanish Navy's Río de la Plata station. The arrival of the screw frigates Concepción and Navas de Tolosa finally allowed Méndez Núñez to release those of his ships in the poorest condition — Villa de Madrid, Reina Blanca, and Resolución — to return to Spain. Villa de Madrid got underway from Rio de Janeiro on 26 September 1866 and reached Spain on 4 November 1866, arriving at Cádiz to a jubilant welcome from the authorities and a crowd of civilians. She entered the Arsenal de la Carraca in San Fernando for careening and repairs.

=== Later service ===
In 1867, Giuseppe Garibaldi launched an expedition to capture Rome from the Papal States and complete the unification of Italy. Villa de Madrid steamed to the Papal States and anchored at Civitavecchia to provide transportation for Pope Pius IX in case he needed to evacuate Rome, but Garibaldi's defeat at the Battle of Mentana on 3 November 1867 made this unnecessary, and Villa de Madrid returned to Spain at the end of 1867, arriving at Cartagena. She entered the Cartagena Iron Drydock for repairs on 10 December 1867, emerging with her repairs complete on 19 December.

Villa de Madrid transported Infanta Isabel, Countess of Girgenti, and her husband Prince Gaetan, Count of Girgenti, to the Papal States for the couple's honeymoon in the spring of 1868, returning to Spain at Cartagena before proceeding to Cádiz. In July 1868 she transported Prince Antoine, Duke of Montpensier, and his family into exile in Lisbon, Portugal, arriving there on 3 August 1868. She then was assigned to San Sebastián, Spain, where the court of Isabella II was in residence.

Villa de Madrid arrived at Cádiz at the end of August 1868 for alterations to her armament, plans calling for her to undergo modifications that would give her twenty 200-millimetre (7.9 in) smoothbore and ten 160-millimetre (6.3 in) rifled guns. However, these plans were cancelled when the Glorious Revolution broke out in September 1868, resulting in the deposition of Isabella II. Under the command of Capitán de navío (Ship-of-the-Line Captain) Rafael Rodríguez de Arias y Villavicencio, she sided with the rebels. On either 23 or 25 September 1868, Villa de Madrid, with General Juan Prim aboard, and the armored frigate Zaragoza got underway from Cádiz for a cruise along the coast of Spain and North Africa to incite rebellion, during which they visited Algeciras, Ceuta, Málaga, Cartagena, Valencia, and Barcelona. After the cruise, she entered the Arsenal de la Carraca at San Fernando for repairs.

In December 1868, Villa de Madrid joined the Mediterranean Squadron, remaining at anchor at Santa Pola during this assignment. In June 1869 she arrived at Valencia for modification of her armament, emerging from it with thirty-four 200-millimetre (7.9 in) guns mounted in battery and six 160-millimetre (6.3 in) rifled guns mounted on her forecastle and stern.

Villa de Madrid was anchored at Cartagena on 24 November 1870 under the command of Capitán de navío (Ship-of-the-Line Captain) Don Eduardo Butler y Anguita and serving as the flagship of the squadron commander, Contraalmirante (Counteradmiral) José Ignacio Rodríguez de Arias when Minister of the Navy José María Beránger Ruiz de Apodaca and President of the Congress of Deputies Manuel Ruiz Zorrilla came aboard. Villa de Madrid, Numancia, and the armored frigate Vitoria then departed Cartagena on 26 November 1870 and steamed in company to La Spezia, Italy, where the Spanish dignitaries offered the Spanish crown to Prince Amadeo of Savoy. On the outward voyage she raised the royal standard without a monarch on board, the only time in the history of Spain that a ship has done so. Amadeo boarded Numancia and the Spanish ships returned to Spain, arriving at Cartagena on 30 December 1870. Amadeo subsequently ruled as Amadeo I of Spain until 1873.

Still part of the Mediterranean Squadron and under Butler's command, Villa de Madrid departed Cartagena in March 1871 for a diplomatic visit to Tangier in company with the armored frigate Arapiles to convey Spanish government demands to Sultan Muhammad IV of Morocco. In company with Numancia, she again visited Tangier in August 1871.

With her crew suffering from low morale and indiscipline, Villa de Madrid anchored at Barcelona on 17 March 1873, where Estanislao Figueras, the first president of the First Spanish Republic, came aboard and addressed the crew. When the Cantonal rebellion began in July 1873, fighting broke out in the Province of Cádiz between centralists who supported the First Spanish Republic's central government and cantonalists, centering around control of the Arsenal de La Carraca in San Fernando. On 30 July 1873, the cantonalists achieved one of their greatest successes when they persuaded part of the crew of Villa de Madrid to take control of the ship, which arrived in Cádiz from Barcelona flying the red flag of the Canton of Cartagena. Sixty members of her crew joined 200 men from the naval gunnery and boatswains schools in a triumphant parade through the streets of Cádiz. Most of her crew abandoned her to enjoy leave granted by the cantonalist government. Her engine was broken, so when the First Spanish Republic's central government attempted to regain control of Cádiz she played only a passive role in the defense of the Arsenal de La Carraca against the centralist squadron of Contraamlirante (Counteradmiral) Miguel Lobo y Malagamba. By 3 August 1873 the cantonalists in Cádiz were in retreat, and centralist sailors took possession of Villa de Madrid, which had been under guard by foreign sailors for several hours.

By a royal order of 15 September 1875, Villa de Madrid was designated as a training ship. She underwent armament modifications to make her more suitable for this role as well as repairs to allow her to conduct training at sea. She subsequently carried out both training cruises and gunnery target practice at the beach at Cape Roche. A 30 September 1878 proposal to install the boilers from Arapiles aboard Villa de Madrid to address Villa de Madrid′s chronic propulsion problems was deemed prohibitively expensive and was not carried out. In October 1879, Villa de Madrid was among the ships that escorted Numancia while Numancia transported King Alfonso XII and Queen Maria Christina from Cartagena to Cádiz.

In 1880, Villa de Madrid was assigned to the Training Squadron, which was under the overall command of Contraalmirale (Counteradmiral) José Polo de Bernabé. On 9 August 1881, Alfonso XII and Maria Christina presided over the squadron's maneuvers off Galicia. On 13 August 1881, the king and queen boarded the armored frigate Sagunto of the Training Squadron, and the rest of the squadron escorted Sagunto as she transported them to La Coruña. The escort duties continued as Sagunto carried the king and queen to Villagarcía de Arosa, arriving there on 15 August, and then on to Vigo in an overnight voyage on 18–19 August 1881. The king and queen then boarded another of the squadron's ships, the gunboat Pelícano, to travel to Bayonne, France, where the ships arrived under escort by the rest of squadron on 25 August 1881. After the king and queen completed their visit to France, the squadron returned to Spain, Villa de Madrid parting company with the rest of the squadron to steam to Vigo while the rest of the squadron proceeded to Ferrol.

== Decommissioning and disposal ==
Villa de Madrid was decommissioned in 1884 and disarmed. She was scrapped at Cádiz later in 1884.

A 600-kilogram (1,323 lb) anchor preserved as a monument on the edge of a pond in the Parque del Buen Retiro in Madrid bears a bronze commemorative plaque which reads "Homenaje a la mar. Ancla que fue de la fragata Villa de Madrid. 27 de febrero de 1982" ("Tribute to the sea. Anchor that belonged to the frigate Villa de Madrid. 27 February 1982"), the date apparently referring to the day on which the monument was dedicated. The plaque implies that the anchor belonged to Villa de Madrid. Although Villa de Madrid carried six anchors – four of 4,600.8 kilograms (10,143 lb), one of 1,242.22 kilograms (2,738.6 lb), one of 644.11 kilograms (1,420 lb), and one of 460.08 kilograms (1,014.3 lb) — she had no anchor matching the one preserved in the park. Apparently, the preserved anchor actually is an Admiralty-model anchor cast in 1930 by Fondeira Milanese Di Acciaio Vanzetti (Vanzetti Milanese Steel Foundry) in Milan, Italy, for the Spanish Compania Transmediterránea motor passenger ship Villa de Madrid, which operated from 1932 to 1979, when she was sold for scrap.
