= Spanish frigate Petronila =

Spanish Navy screw frigate of 1857–1863

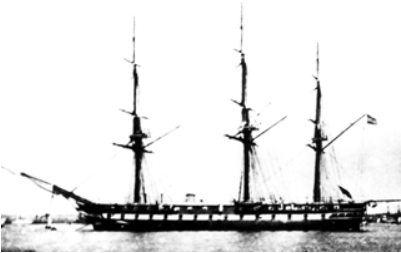

History

Spain
- Name: Petronila
- Namesake: Petronilla of Aragon (1136–1173)
- Ordered: 8 August or 8 October 1853 (see text)
- Builder: Arsenal de Cartagena, Cartagena, Spain
- Cost: 2,909,640 pesetas
- Laid down: 22 February 1854
- Launched: 27 February 1857
- Commissioned: February 1858
- Fate: Wrecked 8 August 1863

General characteristics
- Type: Screw frigate
- Displacement: 2,600 or 3,800 tonnes (2,600 or 3,700 long tons)
- Length: 64 m (210 ft 0 in)
- Beam: 13 m (42 ft 8 in)
- Height: 7.22 m (23 ft 8 in)
- Draft: 6.35 m (20 ft 10 in)
- Installed power: 360 hp (268 kW) (nominal)
- Propulsion: Mixed sail and steam; One steam engine, one shaft, 234 t (230 lt; 258 st) coal
- Speed: 12 to 13 knots (22 to 24 km/h; 14 to 15 mph)
- Complement: 390–400
- Armament: 11 × 200 mm (7.9 in) 68-pounder smoothbore guns; 26 × 160 mm (6.3 in) 32-pounder rifled guns

Petronila was a screw frigate of the Spanish Navy commissioned in 1858. She was the first screw frigate ever built at the Arsenal de Cartagena. She took part in the multinational intervention in Mexico in 1861–1862 and was wrecked in 1863.

Petronila was named for Petronilla of Aragon (1136–1173), sometimes spelled "Petronila" or "Petronella," who was Countess consort of Barcelona from 1150 to 1162, Countess of Barcelona from 1162 to 1164, and Queen Regent of Aragon from 1164 to 1173.

== Construction and commissioning ==
Petronila′s construction was authorized along with that of her two sister ships, the screw frigates Berenguela and Reina Blanca, by a royal order of either 8 August or 8 October 1853 (according to different sources). She was laid down at the Arsenal de Cartagena in Cartagena, Spain, on 22 February 1854 as a wooden-hulled screw frigate with mixed sail and steam propulsion, and was the first screw frigate built at the Arsenal de Cartagena. She carried one of her 200-millimetre (7.9 in) guns on her bow and the rest in her battery; one gun was rifled, the rest smoothbore. She was launched on 27 February 1857, and after fitting out she was commissioned in February 1858. Her total construction cost was 2,909,640 pesetas.

== Service history ==
=== 1858–1863 ===
Under the command of Capitán de fragata (Frigate Captain) José María Beránger, Petronila embarked the King Consort, Francisco de Asís, Duke of Cádiz, at Alicante, Spain, at the end of May 1858 and transported him to Valencia, escorted by a squadron of Spanish Navy warships. After the king consort returned to Cartagena aboard Petronila, the squadron was dissolved. On 8 July 1858, Petronila got underway from Cartagena and, after calling at Cádiz, headed into the Cantabrian Sea for operations along the northern coast of Spain. Subsequently, she was part of a squadron that escorted Queen Isabella II as she made a voyage aboard the ship-of-the-line Rey Don Francisco de Asís from Vigo to Ferrol, which the squadron reached on 1 September 1858. On 5 September 1858, Isabella II boarded Petronila at Gijón in northwestern Spain for a voyage to Ferrol and then to La Coruña, where she disembarked.

In 1859, Petronila embarked 346 marines of the Spanish Marine Infantry at Ferrol for transportation to Cadiz, but ran aground and had to undergo repairs at a naval dockyard. When she was assigned to the naval base at Havana in the Captaincy General of Cuba for duty with the Spanish Navy squadron in the Caribbean, she had to enter a commercial drydock for further repairs after she began to take on an excessive amount of water.

From Havana, Petronila made several voyages, visiting New York City in the United States, Santo Domingo in the Captaincy General of Santo Domingo, Veracruz in Mexico, and La Guaira in Venezuela. Under the command of Capitán de navío (Ship-of-the-Line Captain) Romualdo Martínez y Viñalet, she participated in a mulitnational intervention in Mexico to settle damage claims in 1861–1862 as part of a squadron under Joaquín Gutierrez de Rubalcava. The Spanish ships seized Veracruz on 14 December 1861 and French and British forces arrived in January 1862. Spanish and British forces withdrew from Mexico in April 1862 when it became apparent that France intended to seize control of Mexico, and Petronila embarked Spanish troops and returned to Cuba.

=== Loss ===
On 2 August 1863, Petronila, still under Martínez′s command, got underway from Havana to make a month-long cruise along the northwestern coast of Cuba between Matanzas and Cape San Antonio. On 8 August 1863, however, she ran hard aground at the entrance to the port of Mariel. On the morning of 9 August, the gunboat Isabel la Católica, a sidewheel paddle steamer, departed Havana to assist Petronila, then returned to Havana to report what she had found. On the afternoon of 9 August, Isabel la Católica returned with the gunboat Conde de Venadito, also a sidewheel paddle steamer, to begin an effort to salvage Petronila, bringing divers and equipment such as pumps.

Petronila was refloated on 17 August 1863, but her engines did not function and she again went aground. On 21 August 1863 she was deemed lost, and salvage work shifted to the recovery of her guns, machinery, and other valuable equipment, which the corvette Niña transported to Havana. Petronila′s machinery later was installed in the screw corvette Doña María de Molina, which was built at the Arsenal de La Carraca in San Fernando, Spain, between 1865 and 1869.

In a court martial held on 7 December 1863, Martínez was acquitted of wrongdoing in the loss of Petronila.
