= Spanish frigate Concepción (1860) =

Spanish Navy screw frigate of 1861–1890

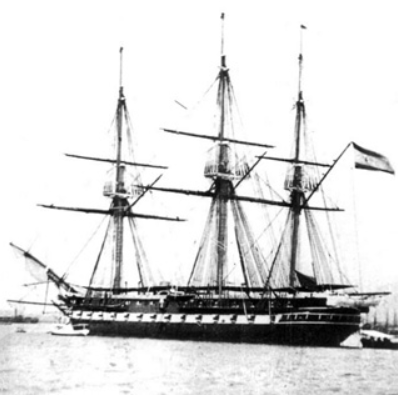

History

Armada Española Ensign First Spanish Republic
- Name: Concepción
- Namesake: The Immaculate Conception
- Ordered: 1858 (authorized)
- Builder: Arsenal de La Carraca, San Fernando, Spain
- Cost: 3,989,010 pesetas
- Laid down: 28 February 1858
- Launched: 2 August 1860
- Commissioned: 6 June 1861
- Decommissioned: 1890 or 1893 (see text)
- Fate: Hulked 1886; Sold for scrapping 1893 or 1897 (see text)

General characteristics
- Type: Screw frigate
- Displacement: 3,210 t (3,160 long tons)
- Length: 70 m (229 ft 8 in) or 70.18 m (230 ft 3 in) (see text)
- Beam: 13.80 m (45 ft 3 in) or 14 m (45 ft 11 in) (see text)
- Height: 6.82 m (22 ft 5 in)
- Draft: 6.12 m (20 ft 1 in) or 6.40 m (21 ft 0 in) (see text)
- Installed power: 600 hp (447 kW) (nominal)
- Propulsion: One John Penn and Sons steam engine, four boilers, one shaft; 360 tons coal
- Speed: 12 knots (22 km/h; 14 mph)
- Complement: 500
- Armament: As built: 1 x 220 mm (8.7 in) gun; 20 x 68-pounder (31 kg) 200 mm (7.9 in) smoothbore guns; 8 x 32-pounder (14.5 kg) 160 mm (6.3 in) smoothbore guns; 8 x 32-pounder (14.5 kg) 160 mm (6.3 in) rifled guns; 2 x 150 mm (5.9 in) bronze howitzers (for use in boats); 2 x 120 mm (4.7 in) rifled bronze guns (for use in boats); 2 x 80 mm (3.1 in) rifled bronze guns (for use in boats); 1870: 1 x 220 mm (8.7 in) gun; 20 x 68-pounder (31 kg) 200 mm (7.9 in) smoothbore guns; 4 x 32-pounder (14.5 kg) 160 mm (6.3 in) rifled guns; 1885: 20 x 68-pounder (31 kg) 200 mm (7.9 in) smoothbore guns; 2 x 32-pounder (14.5 kg) 160 mm (6.3 in) smoothbore guns; 2 x 32-pounder (14.5 kg) 160 mm (6.3 in) rifled guns; 1 x 120 mm (4.7 in) rifled gun; 4 x 80 mm (3.1 in) guns; 1886: Disarmed

Concepción was a Spanish Navy screw frigate commissioned in 1861. The lead ship of the Concepción-class frigates, she was named for the Immaculate Conception. She took part in the mulitnational intervention in Mexico of 1861–1862. She was disarmed and hulked in 1886 and decommissioned and sold for scrapping during the 1890s.

== Characteristics ==
Concepción was a screw frigate with a wooden hull. She had three masts and a bowsprit. She displaced 2,800 tons. According to one source, she was 70.18 metres (230 ft 3 in) long and 13.80 metres (45 ft 3 in) in beam, 6.82 metres (22 ft 5 in) in height, and 6.12 metres (20 ft 1 in) in draft; another source claims that she was 70 metres (229 ft 8 in) long, 14 metres (45 ft 11 in) in beam, and 6.40 metres (21 ft 0 in) in draft, and still another that she was 77 metres (252 ft) long, 15 metres (48 ft) in beam, and 7.11 metres (23 ft 4 in) in draft.

She had a John Penn and Sons steam engine rated at a nominal 600 horsepower (447 kW) which, with her four boilers, gave her a speed of 12 knots (22 km/h; 14 mph). She could carry up to 360 tons of coal. Her armament consisted of a 220-millimetre (8.7 in) swivel gun on her bow, twenty 68-pounder (31 kg) 200-millimetre (7.9 in) smoothbore guns, eight 32-pounder (14.5 kg) 160-millimetre (6.3 in) smoothbore guns, eight 32-pounder (14.5 kg) 160-millimetre (6.3 in) rifled guns, and six bronze guns — two 150-millimetre (5.9 in) howitzers, two 120-millimetre (4.7 in) rifled guns, and two 80-millimetre (3.1 in) rifled guns — for disembarkation and use in her boats. She had a crew of 500 men.

== Construction and commissioning ==
Concepción′s construction was authorized in 1858. Her keel was laid at the Arsenal de La Carraca in San Fernando, Spain, on 28 February 1858, She was launched on 2 August 1860 and commissioned on 6 June 1861.

== Service history ==
Concepción′s first assignment was to the Training Squadron. Later in 1861 she deployed to the Caribbean and was assigned to the naval base at Havana in the Captaincy General of Cuba. A break in relations between Spain and Mexico occurred that year when Spain insisted on the settlement of damage claims it had made. A Spanish squadron under the command of Joaquín Gutierrez de Rubalcava which included Concepción departed Havana to transport a landing force under the command of General Juan Prim to Veracruz as part of a mulitnational intervention in Mexico. The ships and landing force seized Veracruz on 14 December 1861, and French and British forces arrived in January 1862. Spanish and British forces withdrew from Mexico in April 1862 when it became apparent that France intended to seize control of Mexico, and Concepción returned to Cuba.

Concepción returned to Spain in August 1864. On 10 August 1866, she departed Cádiz bound for Rio de Janeiro, Brazil, to replace screw frigates in Contralmirante (Counter Admiral) Casto Méndez Núñez's squadron which had fought in the southeastern Pacific Ocean during the Chincha Islands War. After arriving at Rio de Janeiro on 18 September 1866, she formed a division that also included the screw frigates Almansa and Navas de Tolosa.

Concepción and the rest of Méndez Núñez's squadron arrived at the Rio de la Plata (River Plate) on 12 December 1866. After the Ministry of the Navy received word that a combined Chilean Navy-Peruvian Navy squadron planned to cross into the Atlantic Ocean, Méndez Núñez received orders to return to Rio de Janeiro. On 24 December 1866, the Ministry of the Navy ordered Méndez Núñez to move to Havana and prepare to defend the Antilles against attack. These orders reached Méndez Núñez on 1 February 1867. On 20 March 1867 Concepción, Almansa, and Navas de Tolosa arrived at Santiago de Cuba on the southeastern coast of Cuba under Méndez Núñez's overall command. The ships then proceeded to Havana, which they reached on 26 March 1867. After Méndez Núñez received new orders to proceed to Rio de Janeiro, he transferred his flag to Almansa and his squadron got underway, arriving at Rio de Janeiro in August 1867. The squadron again moved to the Rio de la Plata in November 1867.

In December 1868, Méndez Núñez turned over command of the squadron to Miguel Lobo y Malagamba, with Concepción and the screw frigate Reina Blanca forming a division. When an insurrection against the government broke out in Uruguay in May 1869, Lobo ordered Concepción to patrol the coast of the Río de la Plata to protect Spanish citizens. By the time Concepción arrived at Montevideo, Uruguay, on 13 June the insurrection had been defeated, so she returned to Rio de Janeiro.

The schooner Ceres relieved Concepción on the South American station in August 1869. Concepción got underway from Rio de Janeiro at 07:30 on 17 August 1869 with a crew of only 363 men to return to Spain, where she called at Vigo before proceeding to Ferrol. She underwent repairs and alterations to her armament which left her with a 220-millimetre (8.7 in) swivel gun on her bow, twenty 68-pounder (31 kg) 200-millimetre (7.9 in) smoothbore guns, and four 32-pounder (14.5 kg) 160-millimetre (6.3 in) rifled guns.

In 1870, Concepción was stationed at the Río de la Plata naval station at Montevideo along with Reina Blanca and the screw frigates Gerona and Villa de Madrid. That year she deployed to the Caribbean; based at Havana, she operated in the Antilles. She made a training cruise to the Philippines in 1875. She was based at Havana in 1885, when her armament consisted of sixteen 200-millimetre (7.9 in) smoothbore guns, two 160-millimetre (6.3 in) smoothbore guns, two 160-millimetre (6.3 in) rifled guns, a 120-millimetre (4.7 in) rifled gun, and four 80-millimetre (3.1 in) guns.

Concepción was disarmed in March 1886 and hulked as a floating jetty at Ferrol. She was decommissioned in either 1890 or 1893, according to different sources, and after her decommissioning served as a sanitary hulk at Ferrol. She was sold for scrapping in either 1897 or 1899, again according to different sources.
