= Peruvian frigate Apurímac =

Steam frigate of the Peruvian Navy

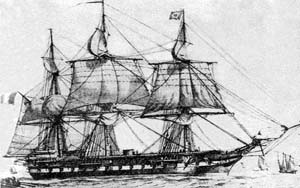
- The frigate Apurímac under sail

History

Perú
- Name: Apurímac
- Ordered: August 1852
- Builder: Richard & Henry Green Shipyard, Blackwall (United Kingdom)
- Laid down: 1853
- Launched: July 1854
- Commissioned: August 1855
- Renamed: Callao (1858-1863)
- Fate: Scuttled to prevent capture in Callao harbor, 16 January 1881
- Notes: Served as training ship from 1873

General characteristics
- Class & type: Screw-propelled steam frigate
- Tons burthen: 1,666 tons bm
- Length: 62.17 m (204 ft 0 in)
- Beam: 13.10 m (43 ft 0 in)
- Draft: 7.16 m (23 ft 6 in)
- Propulsion: 300 hp (220 kW) alternative steam engine made by James Watt & Co; 1-shaft with a folding helix
- Sail plan: Frigate sail rigging
- Speed: 9 knots (17 km/h; 10 mph) on steam; 14 knots (26 km/h; 16 mph) on sail
- Complement: 200
- Armament: in 1855: 44 × 32-pounder; in 1866: 12 × 32-pounder smoothbore guns; 8 × 68-pounder smoothbore guns; 1 × 130-pounder

BAP Apurímac was the second steam frigate of the Peruvian Navy, built in England in 1855 along with the steam schooners Loa and Tumbes as a part of a major build-up of the Navy during the government of President José Rufino Echenique. A veteran of two wars and many internal conflicts, due to her age, she served as training ship in Callao port from 1873 until 17 January 1881, when she was scuttled along with the rest of the Peruvian Navy to prevent capture by Chilean troops who occupied the port the following day after the defeat of the Peruvian Army in the battles of San Juan and Miraflores.

== Construction ==
In 1852, Peru had one of South America's most powerful navies. It had two steam warships, the paddle steamer Rímac and the screw frigate Amazonas, and was surpassed in the region only by Brazil, the United States, and the Pacific fleets of France and England (which had also recently been reinforced with steam warships). To prevent a European intervention—the Royal Navy having had several encounters with the Peruvian Navy in 1830 and 1844—a commission was sent to England to order three more steam warships: two schooners, and the screw frigate Apurímac. This was ordered in August 1852, and built in the Richard & Henry Green Shipyard in London under the supervision of Peruvian-Chilean Captain Jose Maria Salcedo, who served in the Peruvian Navy. She was commissioned in August 1855, and arrived at the port of Callao on 12 November 1855.

== Service history ==
=== Peruvian Civil War of 1856–1858 ===
On 16 November 1856, the frigate, anchored in Arica, was taken by two young officers in favor of Manuel Ignacio de Vivanco; these were Second Lieutenant Lizardo Montero and Lieutenant Miguel Grau, who took the opportunity to seize the ship when her commander, Captain José María Salcedo was on shore visiting the house of the local British consul. The first action of the rebel ship was the release of political prisoners taken by President Ramon Castilla who were held in the hulks Caupolicán and Highlander in Arica.

Then Apurímac sailed north and stirred up an insurrection on the schooner Loa, sent by the government to intercept the rebel ship. By this point, President Castilla had declared that the rebel ships were pirate ships, and set a reward of 200,000 pesos for Apurímac's capture. Therefore, the government sent the steamers Tumbes and Izcuchaca under the command of Captain Ignacio Mariátegui to capture the rebel ships. On 17 November, however, Tumbes defected to the rebels, leaving the government with only the steamer Ucayali as the sole significant warship of the Peruvian Navy, because the steam frigate Amazonas was en route to Hong Kong for repairs.

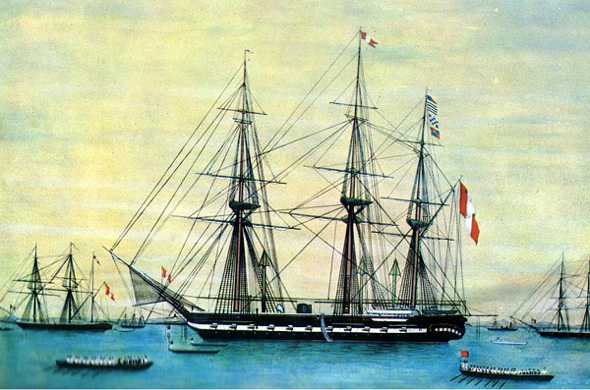
Apurímac, anchored in Callao in 1855

On 27 November 1856, Apurímac and Tumbes raided and then left the port of Arica after the refusal of the garrison to resupply the rebel ships. On 28 December, the fleet captured the Chincha Islands and the steamer Izcuchaca. On 31 December 1856, Apurímac along with the schooners Loa and Tumbes began a blockade of Callao, which was defended only by Ucayali and the old colonial fortress of Real Felipe. After 4 January, the blockade was sustained only by the frigate. She tried to capture Ucayali on 28 January, but that steamer was well defended by Captain Mariátegui and the guns on land. Finally, Apurímac left the port by 30 March to resupply in Pisco.

She returned on 30 April 1857, carrying Vivanco and his army on board with the help of the steamer Huaras, disembarking all the troops the next day at the mouth of the Rimac River with the intention of capturing the port by surprise, but the assault was a complete failure and Vivanco with his remaining troops left Callao on 26 April to meet the rest of the rebel fleet in the Chincha Islands.

The Peruvian government took new measures to recover the control of the sea, and on 21 May signed an accord with representatives of Great Britain and France to allow their ships to protect the production of guano and their economic interests. The original reward for Apurímac's capture was raised to 500,000 pesos. At the same time, President Castilla offered an unconditional pardon to the rebellious sailors. Knowing this, along with the fact that Apurímac could be defeated by the French and British steam frigates, the rebel officers decided to surrender the fleet, which left the Chincha Islands on 22 May and arrived at Callao two days later where it was seized by the government.

Apurímac was renamed Callao by President Castilla on 28 April 1858, in honor to the defenders of this province that fought for the Government against the rebels.

=== War with Ecuador of 1857–1860 ===
The frigate participated in the blockade of Guayaquil under the command of Admiral Ignacio Mariátegui y Telleria as flagship of the Peruvian Navy. This blockade started on 4 November 1858, and lasted for a year until the assault and capture of the port in November 1860.

After the campaign, the frigate was laid up in a floating dock near San Lorenzo Island, but on 17 December 1860, the ship sank along with the dock. On board the ship was her commander, Captain Silva Rodríguez and the entire crew, including cooks, musicians, and visitors from Callao. The ship rolled to port, killing 100 people, including crewman and dock operators, and leaving 88 wounded.

=== Raising and reconstruction ===
To recover the ship, the Plenipotentiary Minister of Perú in the United States, Federico Barreda, contracted the brothers Renton and Addison Crosby of Brooklyn to perform the difficult task for 100,000 pesos. The ship was almost raised on 11 September 1863, but the lack of hoses to extract water from the hull prevented the wreck from being completely raised, and she sank again.

After three years submerged, the ship was raised and beached on San Lorenzo Island on 16 April 1863, and renamed Apurímac again. She received extensive repairs between 1863 and 1864, which included the addition of rail armor in the floating line and the protection of the hull with chains, but these modifications reduced her speed to 7 knots (13 km/h) with steam, and affected her maneuverability. The start of the Civil War of 1865 caught Apurímac without masts, nevertheless the frigate participated in the bombardment of Arica that same year.

=== Chincha Islands War and the Naval Battle of Abtao ===
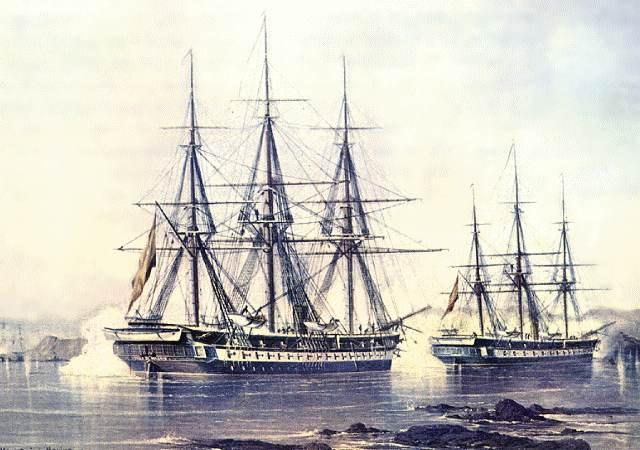
Villa de Madrid and Reina Blanca firing against the allied fleet in Abtao.

Immediately after the declaration of war against Spain, Apurímac (still unmasted), along with the steam frigate Amazonas, was sent to Chile under the command of Captain Lizardo Montero to join the Chilean schooner Covadonga in the Chiloé Archipelago, and to await the arrival of two new steam corvettes of the Peruvian Navy, Unión and America.

On 15 January 1866, almost arriving to the point of reunion, theAmazonas, that was with problems engine ran aground and was lost in Punta Quilque, in front of Abtao Island. Their guns were dismantled and transferred to other ships of the squadron and others were positioned as land batteries at the entrance to the Chayalhue Strait where the fleet was located. The fleet reunited on 4 February 1866, with Chilean auxiliary steamers Lautauro and Antonio Varas in the recently established Chayalhue naval post on Abtao Island, Apurimac became the flagship of the squadron and the Peruvian captain Manuel Villar, commander of the Peruvian division, was placed in command of the allied squadron.

On 7 February, the Spanish steam frigates Reina Blanca and Villa de Madrid appeared off the inlet of Abtao with the mission to destroy it. The allied fleet, aware of the enemy presence, Villar ordered to forme a line of battle in the opposite inlet, covering the three entrances to the naval post. The Spanish frigates slowly entered the cove but Apurímac started the battle by opening fire at 1,500 metres (1,600 yd), being followed by the rest of the allied fleet.

The Spanish ships returned fire, but the accurate gunnery of the allied ships forced them to seek cover behind Abtao island, and continue the battle with elevation shots. Finally, the Spaniards slowly retreated after two hours of battle and 1,500 shots from both sides. Apurímac received moderate damage, with three impacts in her floating line and minor damage on the main deck. The ship remained in Chile until the end of the war.

=== Later years: War of the Pacific ===
After her arrival at Callao, the ship received general repairs and was finally masted, serving until 1873 when her boilers and engine became unusable and were removed. The frigate was then recommissioned as a training vessel. In 1877, the rail and chain armor installed in 1865 was removed during a major repair, allowing the recovery of her original stability.

Apurímac continued in that role until the start of the War of the Pacific, when the frigate remained in Callao harbor as a hulk during the first part of the war. She escaped damage from the continuous attacks of the Chilean Navy during the blockade of Callao between 1880 and 1881, but during the night of 16 January 1881, after the defeat of the Peruvian Army in the battles of San Juan and Miraflores, the Secretary of the Navy, Captain Manuel Villar, ordered the destruction of port defenses and the remaining ships of the Peruvian Navy to prevent their capture by Chilean troops. This order was executed by the captains Luis Germán Astete and Manuel Villavicencio during the dawn of 17 January 1881, and the Apurímac was scuttled.
