= Spanish ship Concepción =

Various Spanish Navy ships

Four ships of the Spanish Navy have borne the name Concepción or La Concepción, after the Immaculate Conception:

- Spanish galleon Concepción, a galleon in service from 1640 to 1648.
- Spanish xebec Concepción, a 14-gun xebec commissioned in 1737.
- Spanish frigate Concepción (1788), a 20-to-30-gun frigate built in 1787 and last recorded in 1808.
- Spanish frigate Concepción (1860), a screw frigate commissioned in 1861, hulked in 1886, decommissioned in either 1890 or 1893, and sold in 1897 or 1899.
