= Battle of Abtao =

1866 naval battle of the Chincha Islands War

- Part of Chincha Islands War
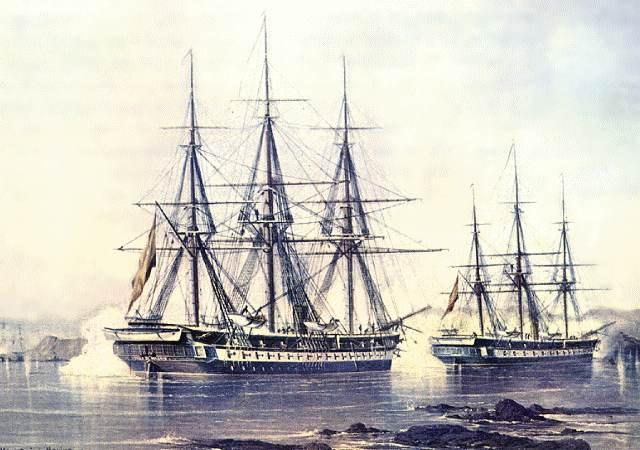
- Spanish screw frigates Reina Blanca and Villa de Madrid during the battle, by Federico Castellón Martínez. Naval Museum of Madrid
Date	February 7, 1866
Location	Abtao, near Chiloé 41°47′43.35″S 73°17′55.40″W
Result	Inconclusive

Belligerents
Spain	Peru; Chile

Commanders and leaders
(Spain) Claudio Alvargonzález Sánchez (Spain) Juan Bautista Topete	(Peru) Manuel Villar Olivera (Peru) Miguel Grau (Peru) Manuel Ferreyros (Chile) Manuel Thomson

Strength
2 frigates	1 frigate 2 corvettes 1 schooner

Casualties and losses
6 wounded	2 to 12 killed, 1 to about 20 wounded

The Battle of Abtao was a naval action fought on February 7, 1866, during the Chincha Islands War, between a Spanish squadron and a combined Peruvian-Chilean fleet, at the island of Abtao in the Gulf of Ancud near Chiloé Archipelago in south-central Chile. It was limited to a long-range exchange of fire between the two squadrons, as the allied ships, anchored behind the island, were protected by shallow waters inaccessible to the Spanish ships, whose gunnery, nevertheless, proved more accurate and inflicted damage to the Chilean and Peruvian ships.

== Background ==
Dispatched by Peruvian president Mariano Ignacio Prado, who had rallied the South American republics in defense against Spanish aggression, the allies had sailed in convoy from the town of Ancud to the island of Abtao to await the arrival of two new corvettes acquired by Peru.

The Spanish commander Casto Méndez Núñez, informed of the location of the Peruvian-Chilean fleet, ordered the steam frigates Villa de Madrid (Captain Claudio Alvargonzález) and Reina Blanca (Commander Juan Topete) to lift the blockade on Valparaíso and sail towards Abtao to intercept the enemy fleet.

On January 16, 1866, the combined Peruvian-Chilean fleet, composed of the Peruvian frigates Apurímac and Amazonas and the recently captured and refurbished Chilean schooner Covadonga, had convoyed from the port of Ancud towards the shipyards on the little island of Abtao, at the head of the southern Chiloé Archipelago. On Abtao island, the Chileans had also built some military fortifications, which were strategically located at the end of a shallow and treacherous channel.

During the difficult voyage, the 36-gun steam frigate Amazonas, overcome by the force of currents, collided with a submerged rock near Punta Quilque and sank. The rest of the allied ships arrived without problems and remained in Abtao with orders to wait for the arrival of the Peruvian corvettes Unión and América in order to start the offensive against the Spanish force. These ships arrived on February 4, 1866, without being detected by the enemy ships.

Meanwhile, the Spanish force was informed by the natives about the presence of other ships near Abtao and immediately set sail for the island.

== Order of battle ==
=== Spanish fleet ===
Name	Commander	Type	Displacement	Armament
Villa de Madrid	Claudio Alvargonzález	Frigate	4.731 metric tons (4.656 long tons; 5.215 short tons)	31 cannons of 68 lb
Villa de Madrid	Claudio Alvargonzález	Frigate	4.731 metric tons (4.656 long tons; 5.215 short tons)	6 cannons of 32 lb
Villa de Madrid	Claudio Alvargonzález	Frigate	4.731 metric tons (4.656 long tons; 5.215 short tons)	5 cannons of 16 cm
Villa de Madrid	Claudio Alvargonzález	Frigate	4.731 metric tons (4.656 long tons; 5.215 short tons)	2 cannons of 12 cm
Reina Blanca	Juan Bautista Topete	Frigate	3.800 metric tons (3.740 long tons; 4.189 short tons)	10 cannons of 68 lb
Reina Blanca	Juan Bautista Topete	Frigate	3.800 metric tons (3.740 long tons; 4.189 short tons)	26 cannons of 32 lb
Reina Blanca	Juan Bautista Topete	Frigate	3.800 metric tons (3.740 long tons; 4.189 short tons)	3 cannons of 12 cm

=== Allied fleet ===
Country	Name	Commander	Type	Displacement	Armament
Perú	Apurímac	Manuel Villar	Frigate	1.666 metric tons (1.640 long tons; 1.836 short tons)	8 cannons of 68 lb
Perú	Apurímac	Manuel Villar	Frigate	1.666 metric tons (1.640 long tons; 1.836 short tons)	20 cannons of 32 lb
Perú	Apurímac	Manuel Villar	Frigate	1.666 metric tons (1.640 long tons; 1.836 short tons)	1 cannon of 130 lb^{1}
Perú	Apurímac	Manuel Villar	Frigate	1.666 metric tons (1.640 long tons; 1.836 short tons)	1 cannon of 68 lb^{1}
Perú	Unión	Miguel Grau	Corvette	2.016 metric tons (1.984 long tons; 2.222 short tons)	12 cannons of 70 lb
Perú	Unión	Miguel Grau	Corvette	2.016 metric tons (1.984 long tons; 2.222 short tons)	2 lower cannons
Perú	América	Manuel Ferreyros	Corvette	2.016 metric tons (1.984 long tons; 2.222 short tons)	12 lower cannon70 lb
Perú	América	Manuel Ferreyros	Corvette	2.016 metric tons (1.984 long tons; 2.222 short tons)	2 lower cannons
Chile	Covadonga	Manuel Thomson	Schooner	630 metric tons (620 long tons; 690 short tons)	3 cannons of 68 lb
Chile	Covadonga	Manuel Thomson	Schooner	630 metric tons (620 long tons; 690 short tons)	2 cannons of 18 cm

== Battle ==
The frigates Villa de Madrid and Reina Blanca appeared off the inlet of Abtao on February 7, 1866, but did not enter, for fear of the shallow waters.

Manuel Villar, Commander of the Peruvian First Naval Division and commander of the combined fleet, ordered the attack when the Spaniards began to proceed through the widest channel. The allied ships (which included Apurímac, América, Unión, and Covadonga) formed a line of battle to cover both inlets of the channel with their artillery.

The allied fleet opened fire at 15:30 hours from 1,500 metres (1,640 yd), followed by fire of the Spanish fleet, which showed great accuracy despite the two frigates being forced to shoot alternately due to the position of the Allied fleet. The Apurímac was hit three times at the water line, forcing her to move north. The América was hit six times. The Unión, where two crewman were killed, was hit three times, and the Covadonga, one. The Spanish ships received fourteen hits, mainly by the América and the Unión, which caused little damage and left 6 crewmen wounded.

After two hours of battle and more of 1,500 shots from each side, the Spanish frigates, seeing that the allied fleet was well protected in her position around the shoals, decided to leave the reef and waited to go out to sea. But this did not happen, and at 9:00 am of the following day, the Spanish squadron returned to its base.

In his report to the Admiral Méndez Nuñez, the Spanish Captain Claudio Alvar González wrote:

The most effective and precise shots came from the Peruvian corvettes Unión and América.

== Aftermath ==
After the results of the Battle of Abtao, Rear Admiral Casto Méndez Núñez traveled south with the armoured frigate Numancia, the screw frigate Resolución, and Reina Blanca to try to force a new confrontation with the allies. But his efforts were unsuccessful. The allied fleet had moved to Huito, a position much more difficult to access than Abtao.

On March 25, the Peruvian corvettes Unión and América were sent to the Strait of Magellan to intercept the Spanish frigate Almansa, which according to intelligence reports had been dispatched from Spain to reinforce the Pacific fleet. The Peruvian ships remained in the area for over a month, but were not able to locate it. The Almansa didn't reach the Pacific coast until the end of April. The Chilean government also sent the steamer Maipú to the strait to intercept the Spanish steamers Odessa and Vascongada.

The rest of the allied fleet remained on the defensive in southern Chile, awaiting the arrival of the ironclads Huáscar and Independencia, which would be the factor to upset the balance of power. Both ships had departed from Brest on 26 February, in what was a long and difficult journey. They were accompanied by the British Steamer Thames, which transported coal and other provisions. On March 30, 1866, off the Brazilian coast, the Peruvian ironclads caused new problems for the Spaniards by intercepting the bergantines Dorotea and Paco. The Dorotea was destroyed, while the Paco was able to avoid capture by moving quickly. On August 22, 1866, the Spanish frigate Gerona captured the Chilean schooner Pampero when it set sail from the jetty of Funchal to Chile.

== Notable sailors in the battle ==
Sub-lieutenant Patricio Montojo y Pasarón, who later became an admiral and commander-in-chief of the Spanish Navy in the Philippines during the Spanish–American War, participated in this battle on the frigate Almansa.

Lieutenants Arturo Prat (Chilean) and Miguel Grau (Peruvian), who were later to battle each other at the Naval Battle of Iquique, were comrades in this battle.

== Bibliography ==
- Adamson, Robert E. & de St. Hubert, Christian (1991). "Question 12/89". Warship International. XXVIII (2): 199–205. ISSN 0043-0374.
- Warship International Staff (1975). "Question 84/73: Navies of Chile, Peru and Ecuador during the Spanish Intervention of 1866". Warship International. XII (4): 350–351. ISSN 0043-0374.
