= Abtao Island =

Part of the Chiloé Archipelago, Chile

Native name: Huapi Abtao
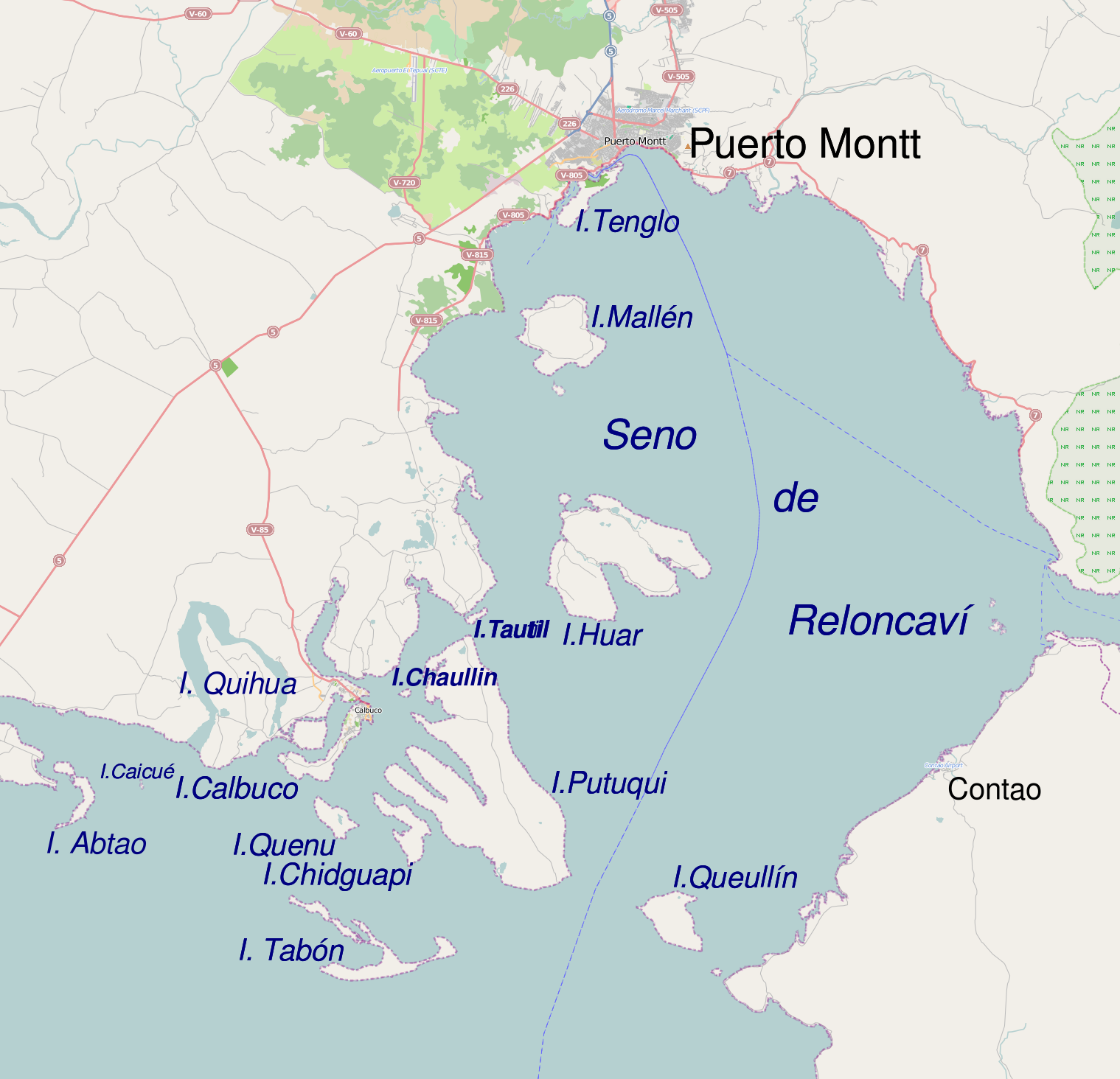
- Abtao Island, lower left
- Interactive map of Abtao Island

Geography
- Coordinates: 41°49′1″S 73°19′27″W
- Adjacent to: Reloncaví Sound, Chacao Channel
- Length: 5.2 km (3.23 mi)
- Width: .8 km (0.5 mi)

Administration
- Chile
- Region: Los Lagos
- Province: Llanquihue
- Commune: Calbuco

Additional information
- NGA UFI -871157

Abtao Island (Isla de Abtao) is part of the Chiloé Archipelago, Chile.

During the Chincha Islands War, the Battle of Abtao took place near the island on 7 February 1866.

== Geography ==
The island is volcanic, lying northwest–southeast off the east coast of the Challahue peninsula. It is about five kilometres (3.1 mi) long and averages about 800 metres (2,600 ft) in width. At its northwest end it terminates at Punta Barranco to the north and Punta Lilihue to the west. At about the northern third the island thins, and there is a protected port, Puerto Abtao, on the western side. At its southwest end it terminates at Punta Quilque. Its southern half is relatively flat, rising slightly higher, 47 metres (154 ft), to the north with a broken terrain. The island is partially forested.

== History ==
At the time of the Spanish colonization of the Americas the island was the domain of the nomadic indigenous Chono people. The island's name "Abtao" is of Chono origin.

The first recorded settlement on Abtao began in 1602 when about three hundred Huilliche who remained loyal to the Spanish fled from the city of Osorno after the Destruction of the Seven Cities, and settled on the island. This population was not subject to the encomienda, but was considered an independent group allied to the Spaniards of the Governorate of Chiloé. The Spanish built a fort on nearby Calbuco Island in 1603 to provide for the protection of this settlement and others in the Gulf of Ancud and Chiloé Archipelago.

The island was one of the last Spanish possessions in Chile, not falling to the Chilean nationalists until 1826.

The Battle of Abtao took place on 7 February 1866 in the channel that separates the island from Punta Auco on the Challahue peninsula to the northwest. As part of the blockade on Valparaiso during the Chincha Islands War the Spanish sent two ironclads to destroy the combined Chilean-Bolivian-Peruvian fleet. The attempt was unsuccessful. All three South American participants issued medals for the action. There is a small monument on the island to the battle, where, annually, Chilean Navy personnel commemorate the successful repulsing of the enemy.
