= Rafael Monleón =

Spanish painter, archaeologist and historian

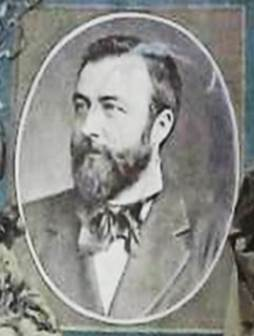
Monleón in 1885

Rafael Monleón y Torres (1843 – 24 November 1900) was a Spanish painter, archaeologist and historian who specialised in marine art.

== Life ==
He was born in Valencia. His father was the architect, Sebastián Monleón Estellés, a professor at the Real Academia de Bellas Artes de San Carlos. After studying there from 1855 to 1866, he joined the merchant marine and became a pilot; sailing around Europe. Later, he was a student of the marine artist Paul Jean Clays in Bruges, where he also studied engraving. Upon his return to Spain, he completed his studies with Carlos de Haes. At first, he was primarily a painter of azulejos, and his experience as a sailor gave him a particular talent for marine art. He focused on shipwrecks and other dramatic scenes, but he was also knowledgeable in regards to naval archaeology and history; which he was able to take advantage of when he was named the conservator/restorer for the Museo Naval de Madrid in 1870.

His most ambitious work was never published during his lifetime: the treatise on the Historia gráfica de la navegación y de las construcciones navales en todos los tiempos y en todos los países (Graphic History of Navigation and Naval Construction...). It was illustrated with over a thousand drawings, blue prints and watercolors; completed while he was at the museum, together with hundreds of texts and vignettes on every known type of ship, European and Oriental. A small excerpt was later published as La Construcción Naval española en la obra de Rafael Monleón Torres.

He participated in every National Exhibition of Fine Arts after 1864, except for 1892, owing to his involvement in the celebrations for the four-hundredth anniversary of the "Discovery of America", which included an elaborate scale model of the Santa María being made as a gift to the United States. As a result, he was awarded a second-class Cross of Naval Merit and the title of Commander in the Order of Charles III. As an engraver, he provided illustrations on marine topics for La Ilustración Española y Americana, Nuevo Mundo (New World) and other periodicals. He also created ceramics, some of which have been preserved at the González Martí National Museum of Ceramics and Decorative Arts. As a designer, he created his own office furniture. He died in Madrid, aged 57.

== Gallery ==
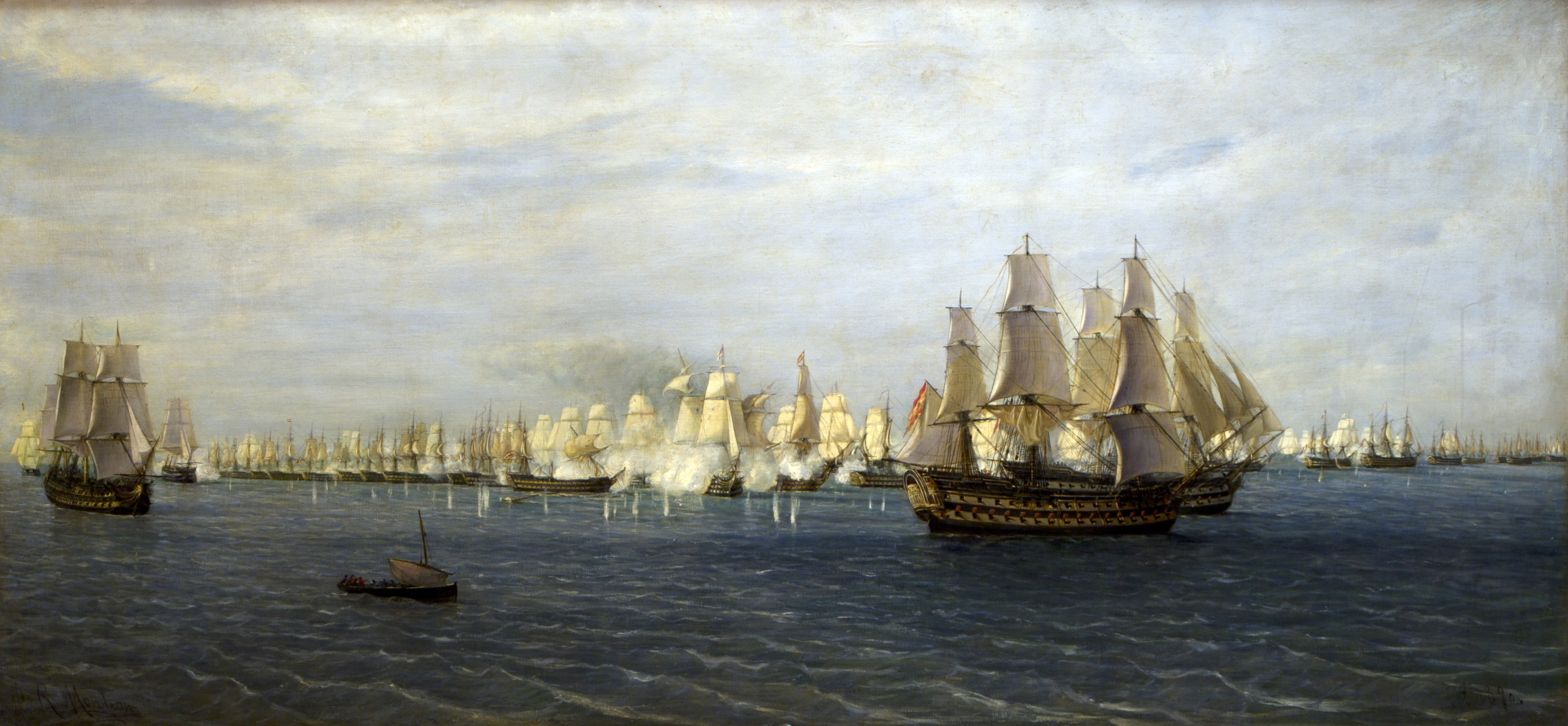
The battle of Trafalgar (1870)

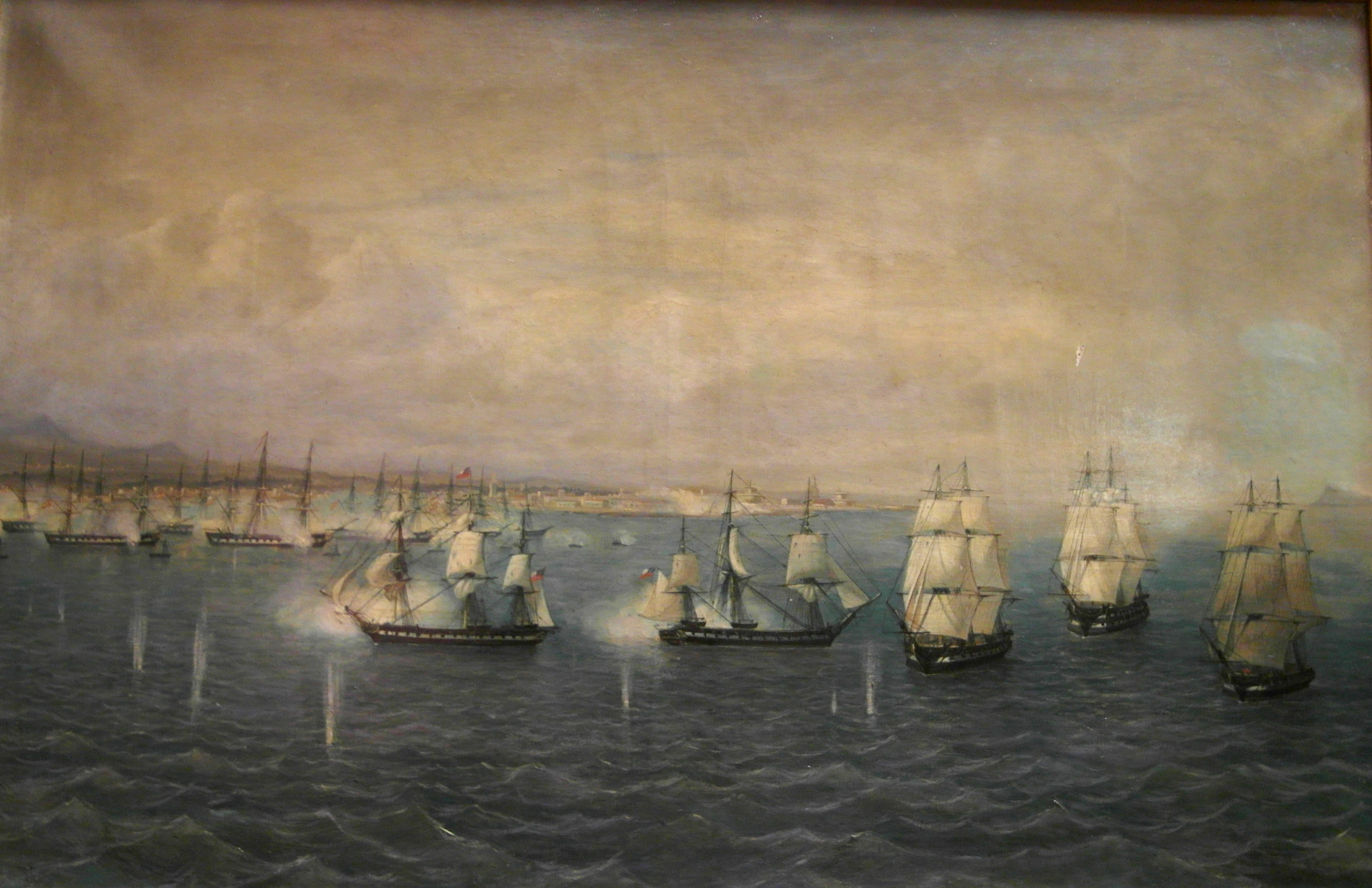
Attack on Callao by the Chilean independentists (1872)

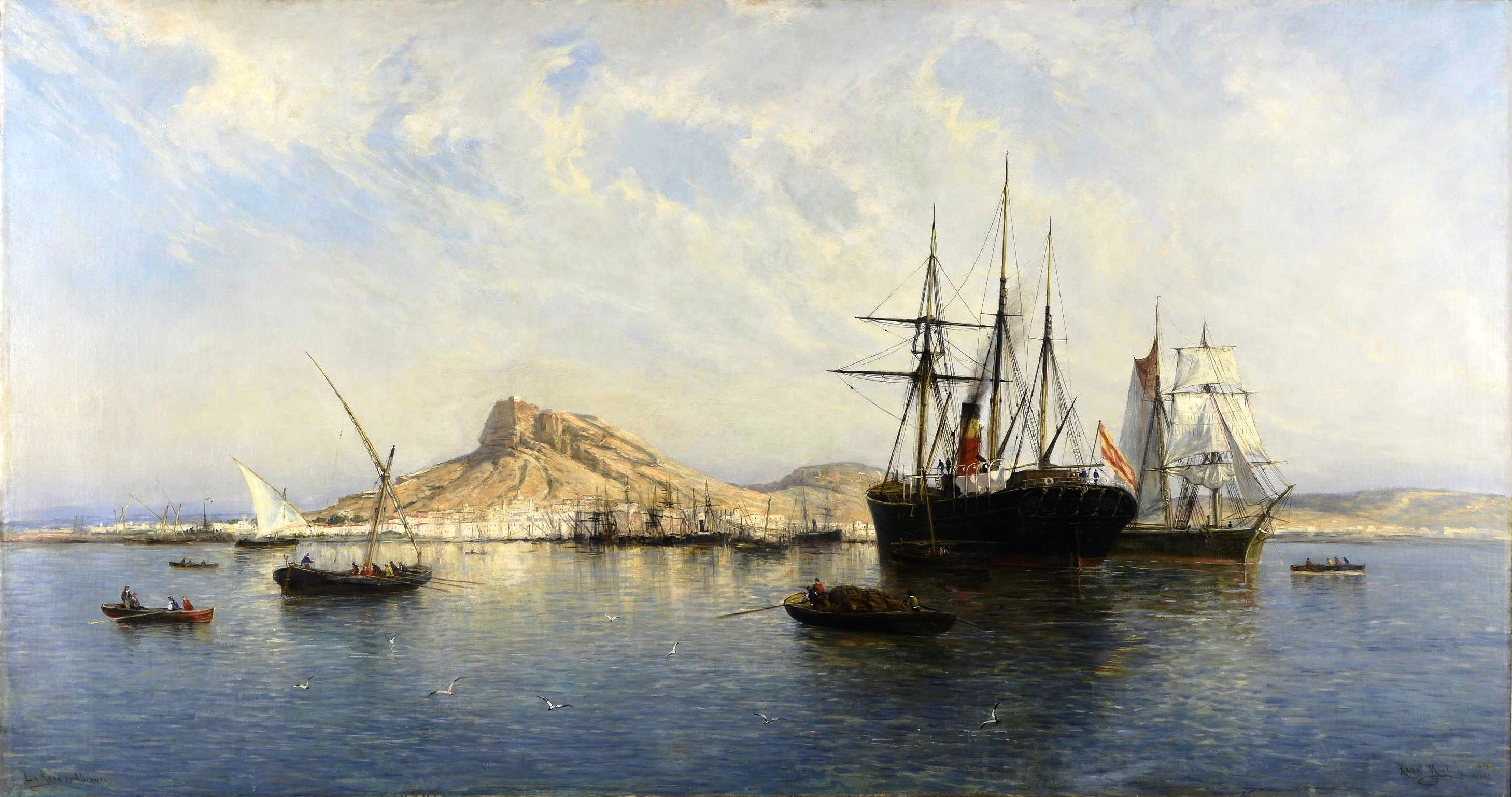
The harbour of Alicante (1881)

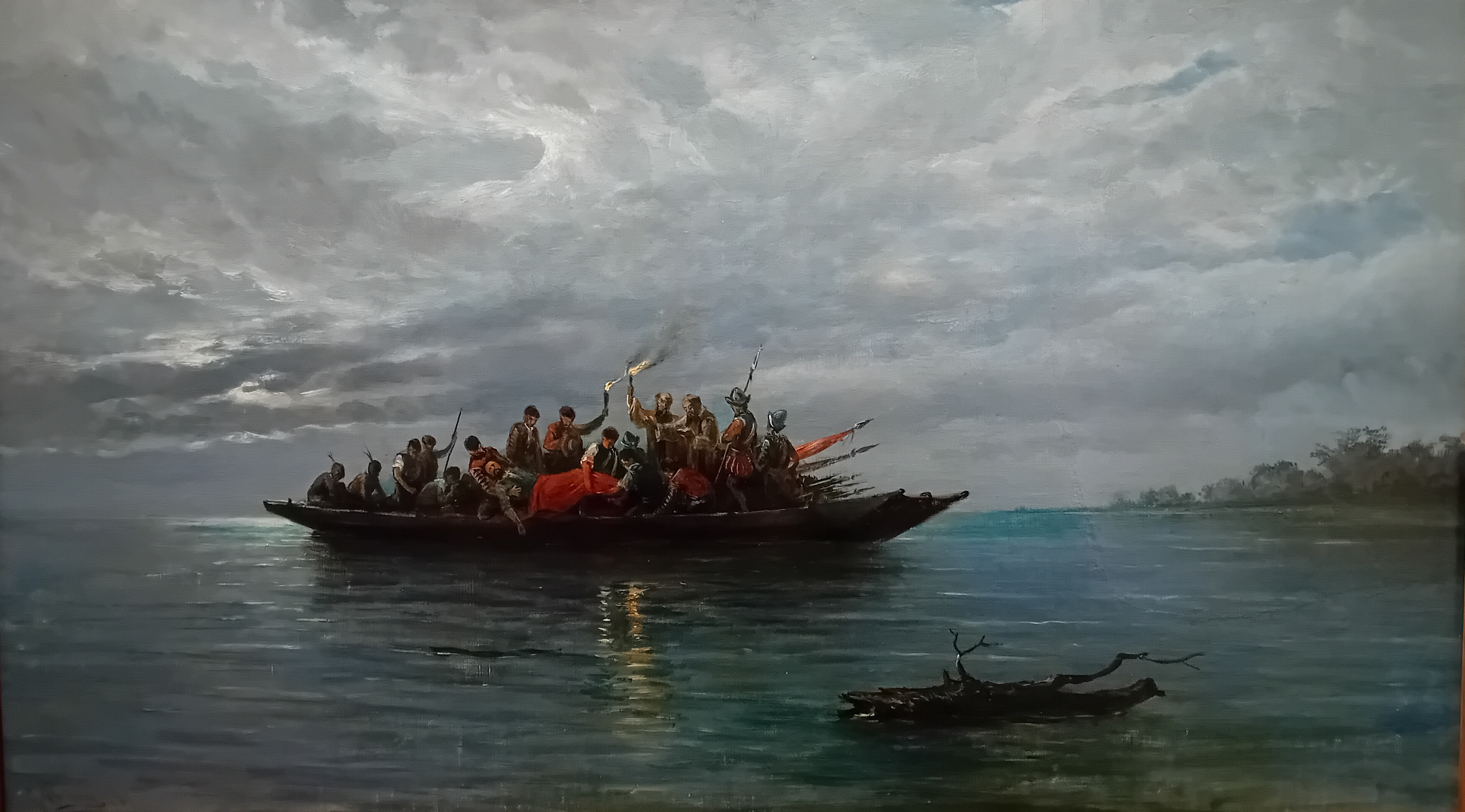
The corpse of Hernando de Soto is thrown into the Mississippi River, July 1542 (1887)

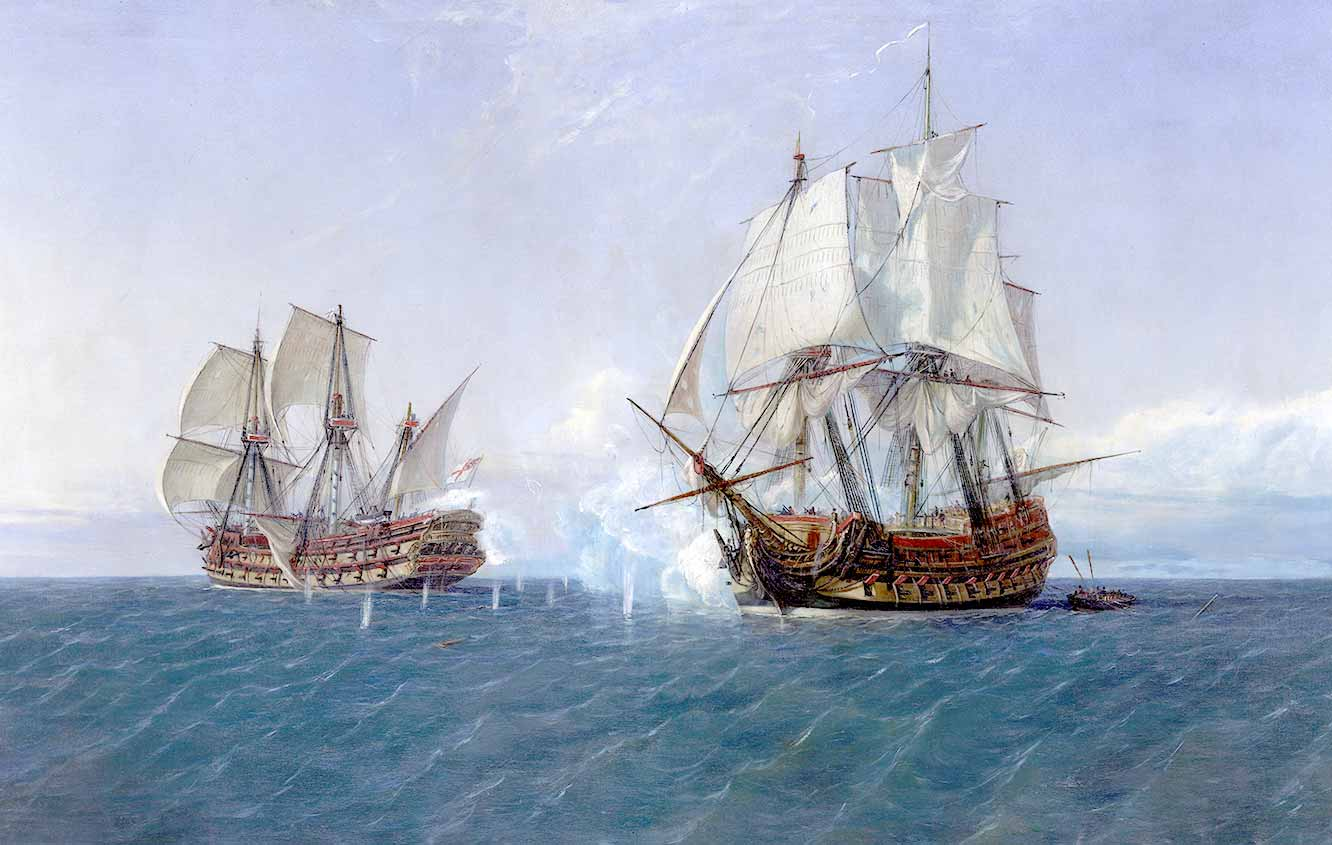
The battle of the Spanish ship of the line Catalán with the British Mary, in 1719 (1888)

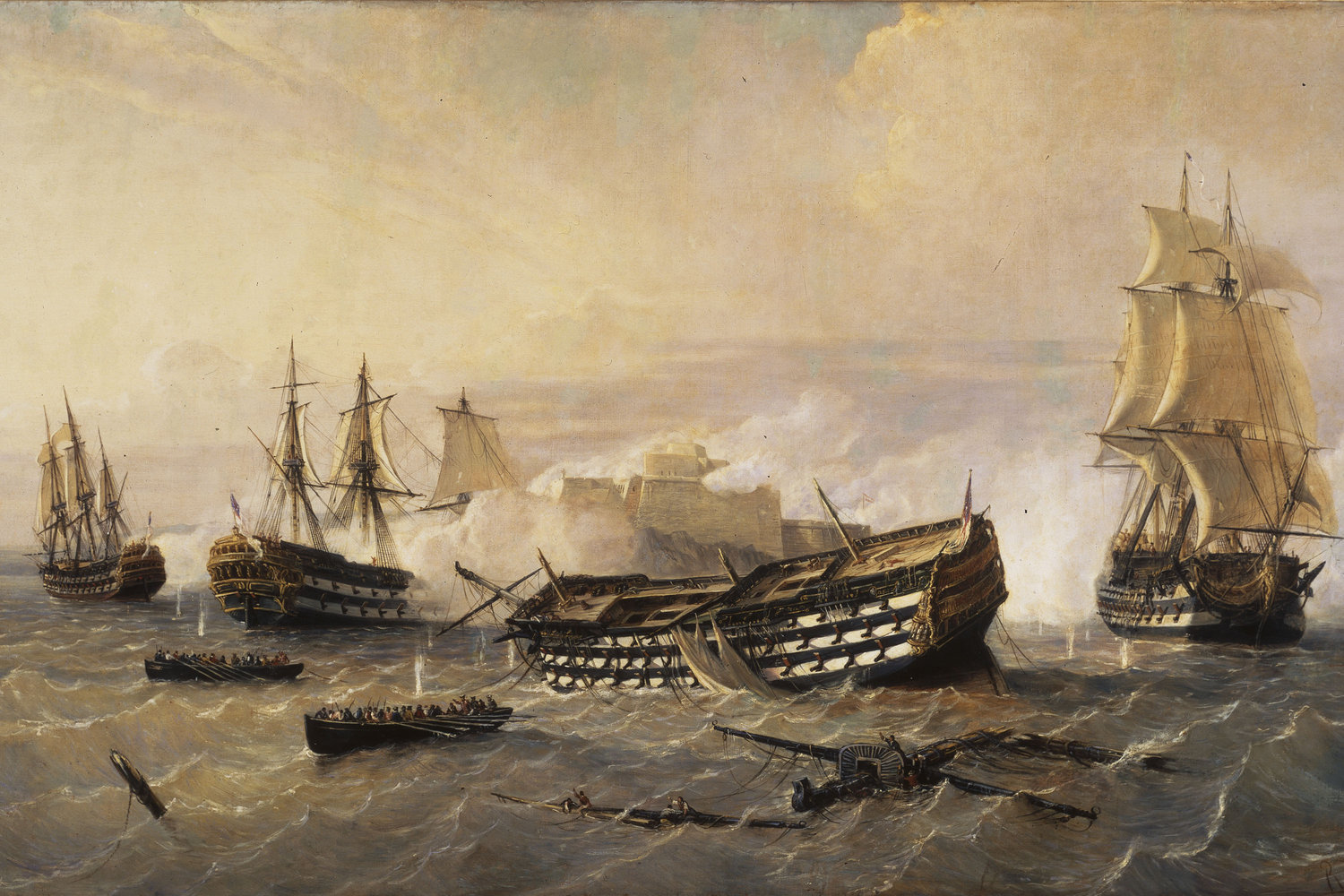
Defence of the Havana Promontory in 1762 (c. 1898)
