= Calbuco Island =

Island in Los Lagos Region, Chile

Native name: Isla Calbuco
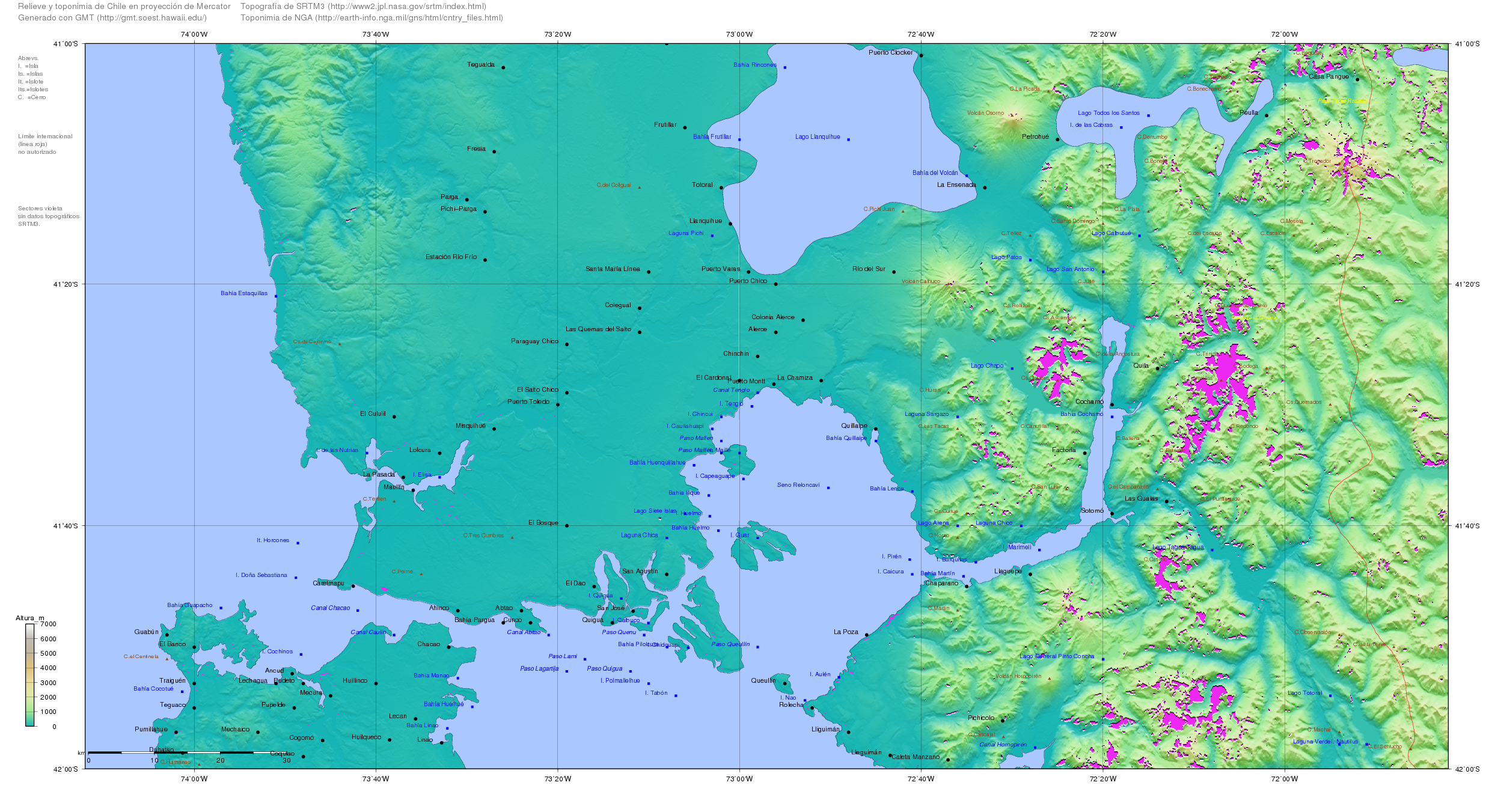
- See topography and toponym of the Region

- Location within Los Lagos

Geography
- Coordinates: 41.78014°S 73.13951°W
- Adjacent to: Reloncaví Sound, Pacific Ocean

Administration
- Chile
- Region: Los Lagos
- Province: Llanquihue
- Commune: Calbuco

Additional information
- NGA UFI -874659

Calbuco Island (also Caicaén Island) is an island in the commune of Calbuco, Llanquihue Province, Los Lagos Region, Chile. The city of Calbuco is on the island. The island was separated from the mainland by the Calbuco Channel (Spanish: Canal de Calbuco), but a causeway was built in 1965 to connect the island to the continent. Due to its protected location the channel hosts a series of aquaculture cultivations.

In 1603 the Spanish under the command of Francisco Hernández Ortiz-Pizarrro established a fort on the island to protect their settlements in the Gulf of Ancud.
