= Joaquín Gutiérrez de Rubalcava =

Spanish politician (1803–1881)

Joaquín Gutierrez de Rubalcaba
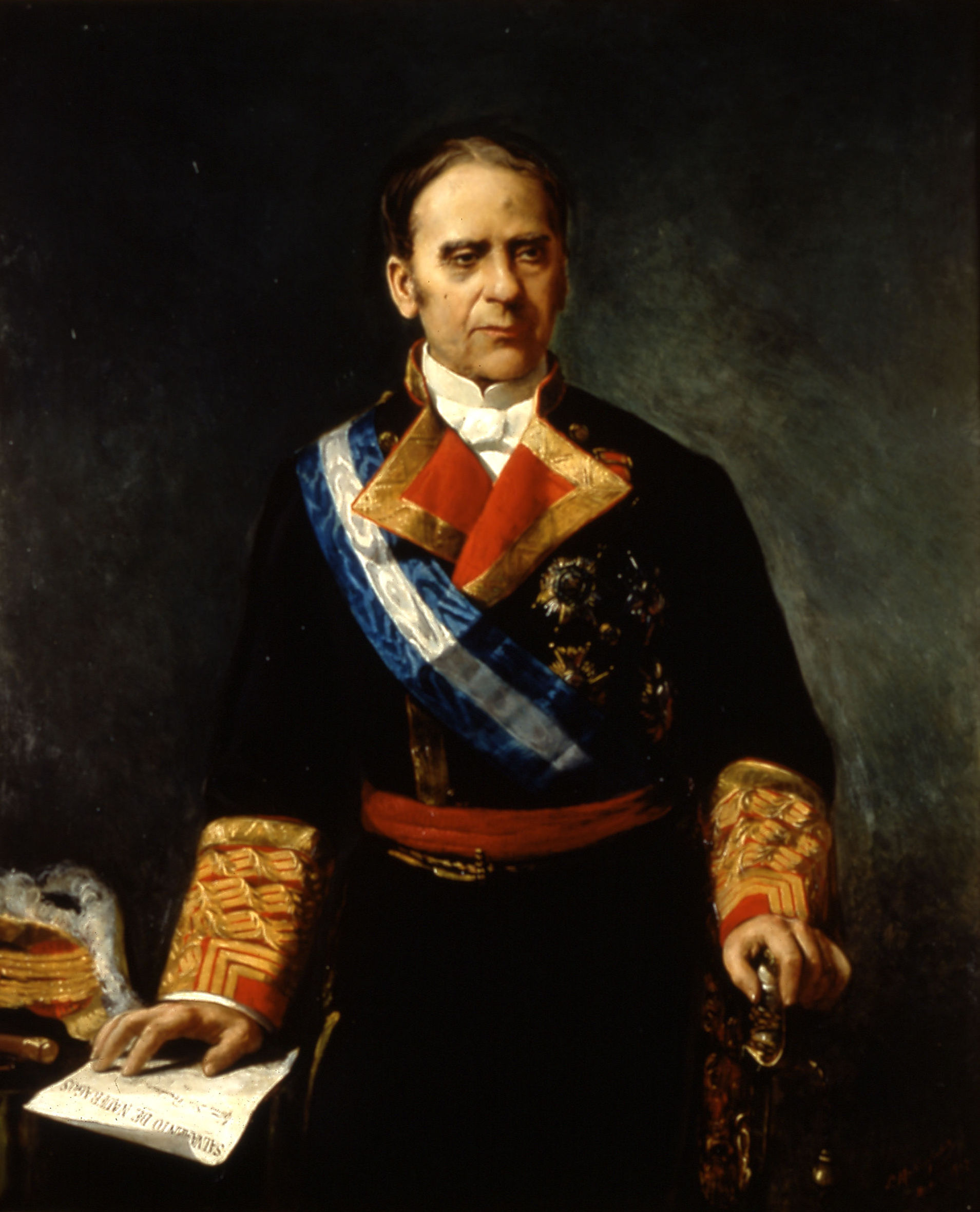
- Portrait by Salvador Martínez Cubells, c. 1882

Minister of the Navy (Spain)
- In office January 17, 1864 – March 1, 1864
- Monarch: Queen Isabella II
- President: Lorenzo Arrazola Garcia
- Succeeded by: Jose Manuel Pareja

Personal details
- Born: March 19, 1803 Ferrol, Spain
- Died: April 13, 1881 (aged 78) Madrid, Spain

Joaquín Gutiérrez de Rubalcava Casal (March 19, 1803 – April 13, 1881) was a Galician military man and politician, admiral of the Spanish Navy and minister during the reign of Isabel II of Spain.

== Biography ==
He was the son of Alejo Gutiérrez Rubalcava y Medina, a knight of the Order of Saint James. In 1819, he entered Ferrol as a midshipman and embarked on the frigates Fama, María Isabel and Ninfa; on the schooner Belona and the brig Vengador. In 1821, he was promoted to ensign, in 1825 to ensign, in 1833 to lieutenant and in 1840 to captain. He was sent to Lima and in 1842, he fought ships of the Chilean Navy on the island of Chiloé. In 1842 and 1846, he was elected deputy for A Coruña. In 1846, he was promoted to captain and in 1848, he was sent to Havana as Port Captain. In 1852, he was promoted to brigadier and in 1853, he was appointed commander-in-chief of the Mediterranean Naval Division. In 1854, he was appointed director of the Hydrographic Deposit and member of the board of directors of the Geographical Map of Spain. In 1856, he was appointed major general of the Spanish Navy and in 1857 chief of the squadron. In 1859, he was captain general of Cartagena and in 1860 he was commander-in-chief of the Havana Post. In 1861, he sent Spanish warships to force Haitian President Fabre Geffrard to cease all support of the Dominican revolutionary Francisco del Rosario Sánchez. During 1862, he participated in an expedition in support of Maximilian I of Mexico under the orders of Juan Prim. In 1863, he was appointed president of the Superior Consultative Board of the Spanish Navy and senator for life. In 1864, he was appointed lieutenant general and minister of the navy under the government of Lorenzo Arrazola García (January–March 1864). He would again be minister of the navy in the last government of Ramón María Narváez (1866–1867).

After the Glorious Revolution, he requested separation from the corps. Following the Bourbon restoration he requested reinstatement and was once again appointed senator for life, president of the naval section of the Council of State and in 1875 he was promoted to admiral. Among other decorations, he received the Grand Crosses of the Order of Saint Hermenegild, the Order of Charles III and the Order of Isabella the Catholic, as well as the Cross of Naval Merit with red badge.

== See also ==
- Dominican Restoration War
- Glorious Revolution
