= José Romero y Fernández de Landa =

Spanish military officer (1735–1807)

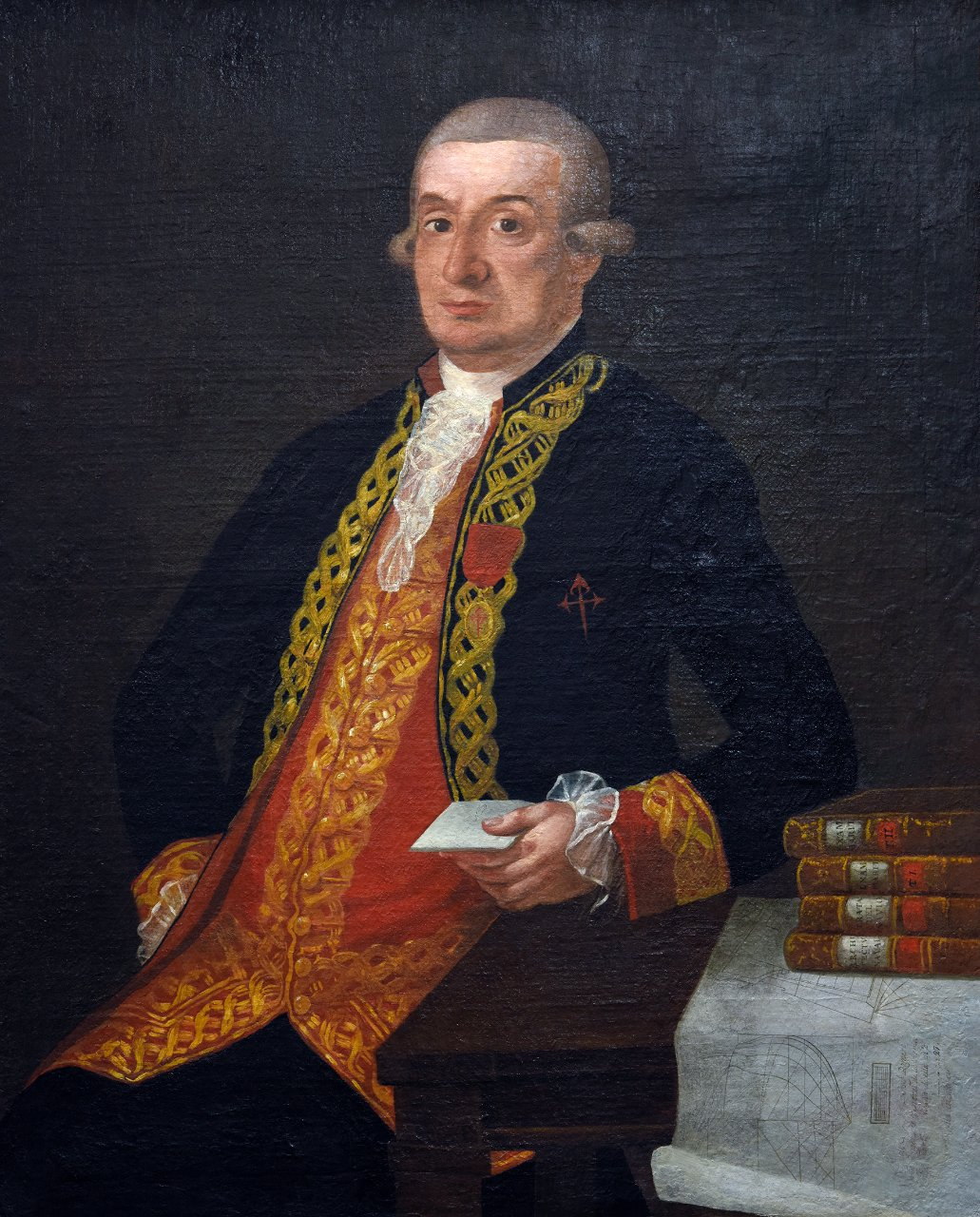
- Portrait of de Landa
- Born: 27 May 1735; Huelva, Spain
- Died: 5 August 1807 (aged 72); Madrid, Spain

José Romero y Fernández de Landa (27 May 1735 – 5 August 1807) was a Spanish military officer and shipwright who was the Spanish Navy's first official ship designer. He designed several ships of the line in the late 18th and early 19th centuries which fought at the Battle of Cape St. Vincent and the Battle of Trafalgar. He is also notable as the writer of Reglamento de maderas necesarias para la fábrica de los baxeles del Rey (Rules for the wood necessary for building the King's ships), published in 1784, and which specified the number and dimensions of the hulls, equipment, masts and rigging for ships of 100, 74, 64 and 34 guns.

== Life ==
On 27 May 1752 Romero Landa joined the Regimiento de Dragones de Edimburgo at Villa de Arcos, commanding a company. In 1754 he transferred to the navy, becoming an 'alférez de fragata' (ensign) and commanded the 5th Company of the 2nd Battalion of Marines at Ferrol.

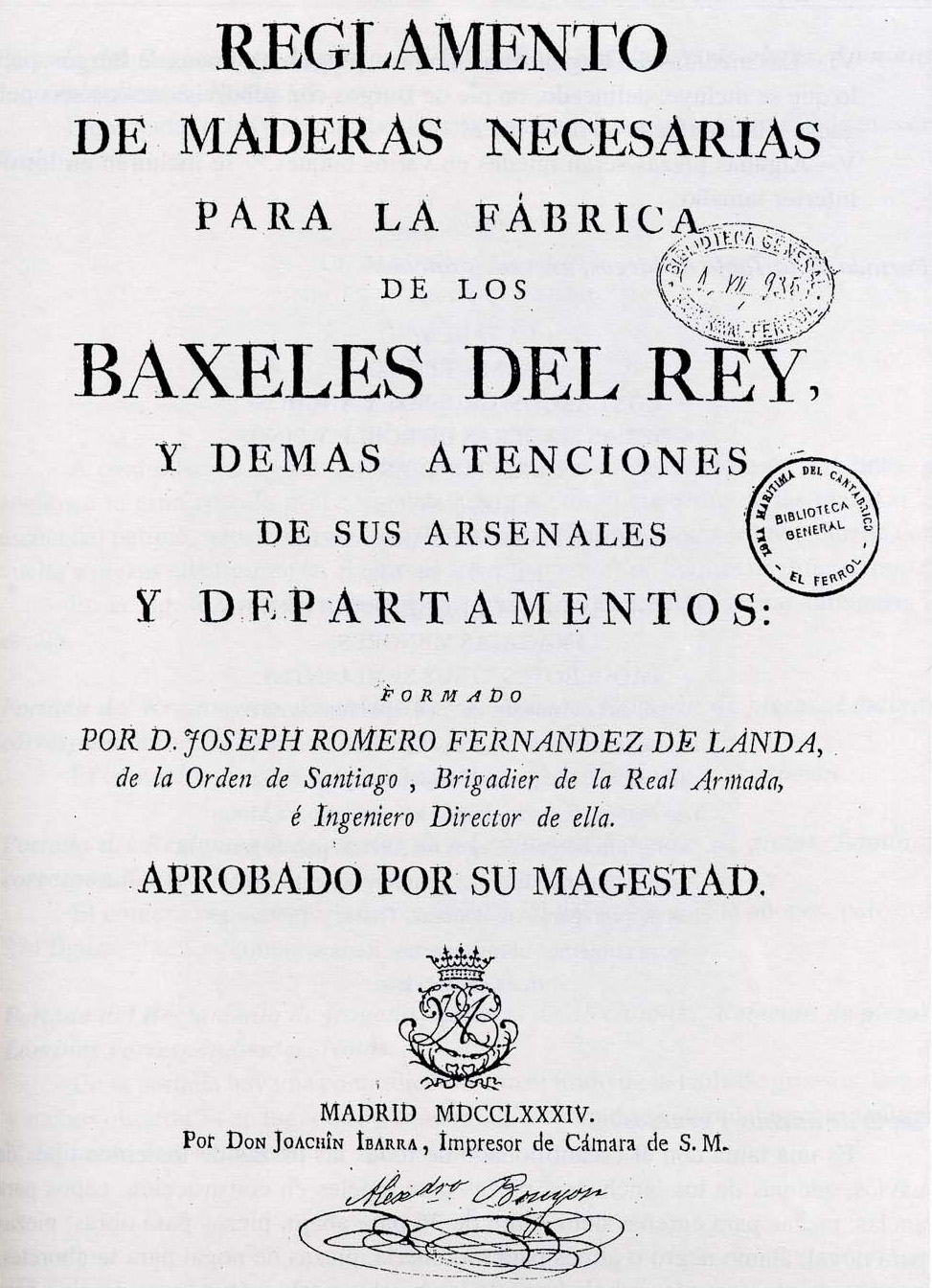
Cover of the Reglamento de maderas necesarias para la fábrica de los baxeles del Rey by Romero Landa (1784)

On 1 November 1765 he started working at the shipyard at Guarnizo, under the ship designer Francisco Gautier. In October 1770, on the creation of the Cuerpo de Ingenieros de Marina, he was one of its few officials from the Cuerpo de Oficiales de Guerra to join the new body. Promoted to frigate captain, he was appointed Commandant of the Engineers and Engineer General, rising to Engineer General of the Fleet on 28 January 1786.

== Warships designed by Romero Landa ==
=== 112-gun ships ===
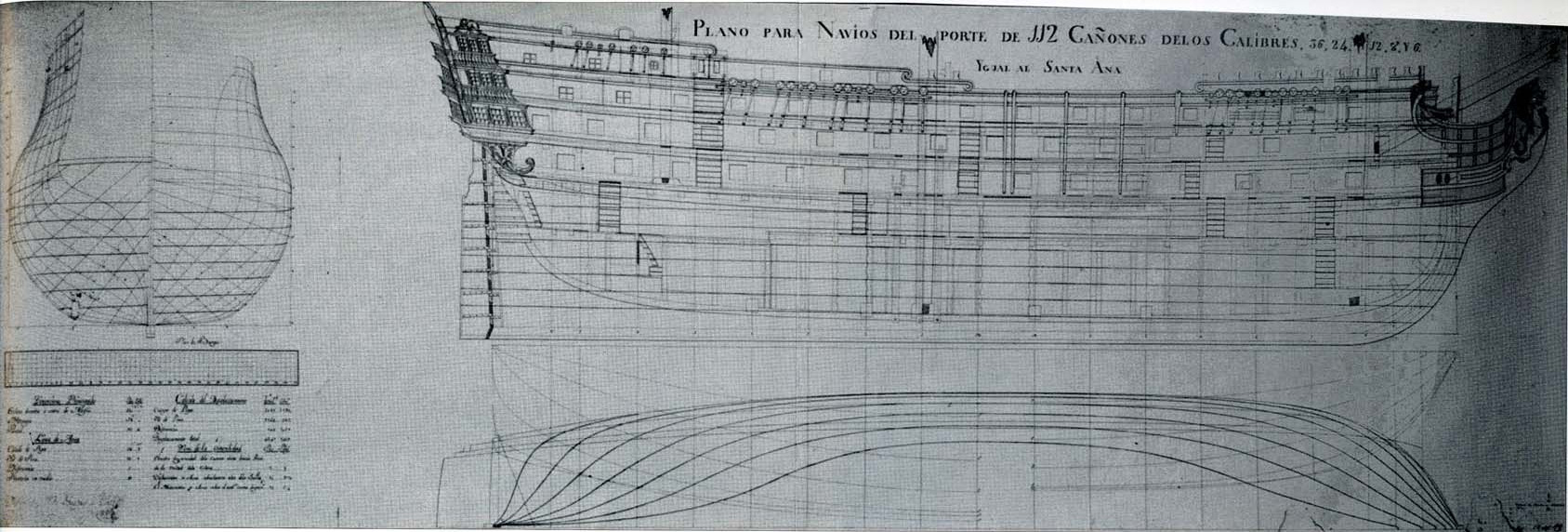
Plan of a Santa Ana class 112-gun ship

| Launch date | Name | Alias/Advocacy | Shipyard | In service |
|---|---|---|---|---|
| 28 September 1784 | Santa Ana | Santana | Ferrol | 1784–1816 |
| 20 January 1786 | Mexicano | San Hipólito | Havana | |
| 4 November 1786 | Conde de Regla | Nuestra Señora de Regla (Our Lady of Regla) | Havana | |
| 2 May 1787 | Salvador del Mundo | El Salvador | Ferrol | |
| 4 November 1787 | Real Carlos | Santiago | Havana | |
| 20 January 1789 | San Hermenegildo | | Havana | |
| 12 September 1791 | Reina María Luisa | Reina Luisa (Queen Louise) | Ferrol | |
| 28 January 1794 | Príncipe de Asturias | Los Santos Reyes (The Holy Kings) | Havana | 1794–1812 |

=== 74-gun ships ===
| Launch date | Name | Alias/Advocacy | Shipyard | In service |
|---|---|---|---|---|
| 22 January 1785 | San Ildefonso | San Ildefonso, Segovia | Cartagena | 1784–1805–1816 |
| 20 June 1788 | San Telmo | | Ferrol | |
| 20 December 1788 | San Francisco de Paula | | Cartagena | |
| 19 October 1789 | Europa | San Lesmes | Ferrol | |
| 20 November 1790 | Intrépido | | Ferrol | |
| 9 December 1791 | Conquistador | | Cartagena | |
| 22 November 1792 | Infante don Pelayo | | Havana | |
| 1794 | Monarca | | Ferrol | 1794–1805 |

=== 64-gun ships ===
The three 64-gun ships designed by Romero Landa were an extension of his 74-gun designs, changing its main dimensions on a scale of α=49,5/52.

| Launch date | Name | Shipyard | In service |
|---|---|---|---|
| 3 November 1787 | San Fulgencio | Cartagena | |
| 27 November 1787 | San Leandro | Ferrol | 1787–1812 |
| 27 June 1788 | San Pedro Alcántara | Havana | |

=== Frigates ===
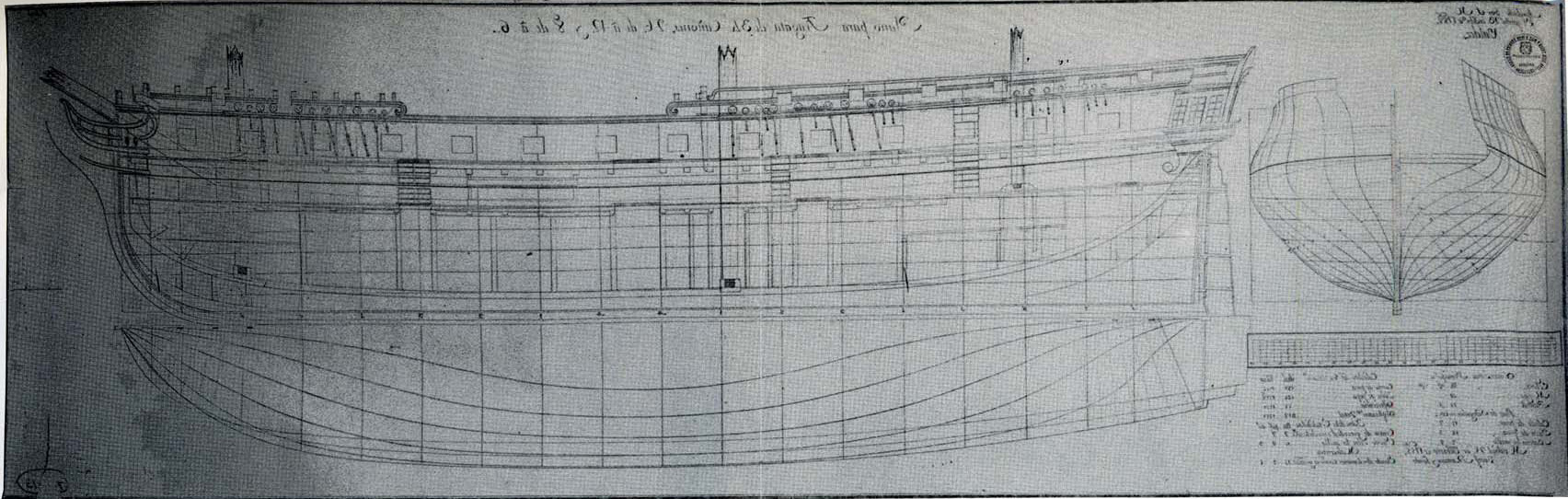
Plan of a 34-gun frigate

| Launch date | Name | Shipyard |
|---|---|---|
| 12 March 1784 | Santa Casilda | Cartagena |
| 4 March 1786 | Santa Florentina | Cartagena |
| 3 May 1788 | Nuestra Señora de la Soledad | Cartagena |
| 2 October 1789 | Mahonesa | Mahón |
| 31 July 1789 | Perla | Cartagena |
| 1791 | Preciosa | Cádiz |

== Battle of Trafalgar ==
Five of the ships built to Romero Landa's design saw action at Trafalgar:

- Santa Ana (112 guns)
- Príncipe de Asturias (112 guns)
- San Ildefonso (74 guns)
- Monarca (74 guns)
- San Leandro (64 guns)

== Bibliography ==
- Juan-García Aguado, José María (1998). José Romero Fernández de Landa, un Ingeniero de Marina del Siglo XVIII. Universidade da Coruña. ISBN 84-89694-66-4
