= Spanish ship Real Carlos =

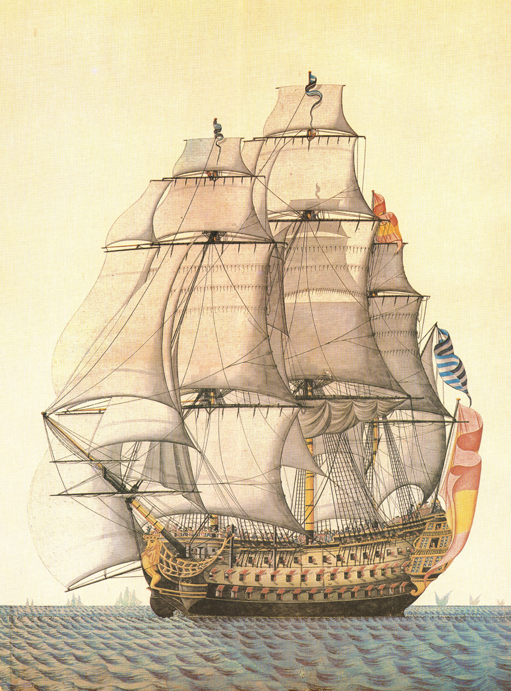
- Illustration of Real Carlos by Alejo Berlinguero

History

Spain
- Name: Real Carlos
- Builder: Havanna
- Launched: 4 November 1787
- Fate: Burned and exploded 13 July 1801
- Notes: Participated in: Second Battle of Algeciras (1801)

General characteristics
- Class & type: Santa Ana-class ship of the line
- Tonnage: 2,112 tonnes
- Length: 56.14 m
- Beam: 15.5 m
- Draught: 7.37 m
- Sail plan: Full-rigged ship
- Complement: 801
- Armament: On launch: 30 × 36-pounder cannon; 32 × 24-pounder cannon; 32 × 12-pounder cannon; 18 × 8-pounder cannon
- Armour: None

Real Carlos was a 112-gun ship of the line of the Spanish Navy built at Havana in 1787 to plans by José Romero y Fernández de Landa. One of the eight very large ships of the line of the Santa Ana class, also known as los Meregildos, Real Carlos served in the Spanish Navy during the French Revolutionary Wars and was destroyed with heavy loss of life during the Second Battle of Algeciras.

== Construction ==
The Santa Ana class was built for the Spanish fleet in the 1780s and 1790s as heavy ships of the line, the equivalent of Royal Navy first rate ships. The other ships of the class were the Santa Ana, Mexicano, Salvador del Mundo, Conde de Regla, San Hermenegildo, Reina María Luisa and Príncipe de Asturias. Three of the class were captured or destroyed during the French Revolutionary Wars.

== History ==
In 1793 the Real Carlos was under the command of Baltasar Sesma y Zaylorda as the flagship of Admiral Francisco de Borja. Borja led an expedition to Sardinia, capturing the islands of San Pietro Island for Spain and Sant'Antioco for France.

On 8 April 1799, Real Carlos was flagship of the Ferrol squadron under Francisco Melgarejo, alongside Argonauta, Monarca, San Agustín, Castilla and three smaller ships. This squadron sailed in an effort to unite with the French Atlantic Fleet operating in the Croisière de Bruix, but missed the rendezvous and spent much of the rest of the year at anchor in Rochefort, returning on 11 September. The following year Real Carlos participated in repelling the Ferrol Expedition.

By July 1801, Real Carlos was at Cádiz. When a French squadron repelled a British force at the First Battle of Algeciras on 6 July, Real Carlos joined the squadron sent to escort the French from Algeciras back to Cádiz. During the night of 12 July the combined force was returning through the Straits of Gibraltar when a British squadron attacked them at the Second Battle of Algeciras. During the confused night action which followed, HMS Superb cut through the rearguard and between Real Carlos and San Hermenegildo. The Spanish ships opened fire, striking one another, as a fire spread across Real Carlos's decks. In the darkness the two huge Spanish ships collided, fire spreading out of control until both exploded in a fireball that could be seen from shore. More than 1,700 men were killed in the blast, one of the greatest losses of life at sea to that time. The heavy Spanish casualties incurred by the defeat contributed to a breakdown of the Franco-Spanish alliance.

== Bibliography ==
- Winfield, Rif; Tredrea, John M; García-Torralba Pérez, Enrique & Blasco Felip, Manuel (2023). Spanish Warships in the Age of Sail 1700—1860: Design, Construction, Careers and Fates. Seaforth Publishing. ISBN 978-1-5267-9078-1.
