= Action of 1 May 1781 =

Naval engagement

- Part of the American War of Independence
| Date | 1 May 1781 |
| Location | 210 miles (340 km) off Brest, France |
| Result | British victory |

Belligerents
| Spain | Great Britain |

Commanders and leaders
| (Spain) Don Francisco Winthuysen (surrendered) | (Kingdom of Great Britain) Sir George Collier |

Strength
| 1 frigate Santa Leocadia 40 guns (reduced to 34) | 1 ship of the line HMS Canada 74 guns |

Casualties and losses
| 1 frigate captured 80 killed 106 wounded 200 captured | 13 casualties |

The action of 1 May 1781 was a naval engagement nearly 210 miles off the Port of Brest in which HMS Canada, a 74-gun third rate of the Royal Navy under Captain George Collier chased, intercepted and captured the 40-gun Spanish frigate Santa Leocadia, captained by Don Francisco Wenthuisen.

== Battle ==
On 30 April, the 74-gun ship HMS Canada, Captain Sir George Collier, having been detached by Vice-Admiral George Darby, commander-in-chief of the Channel Fleet, to watch the port of Brest, discovered a squadron of small ships. The squadron dispersed on her approach, upon which Canada chased the largest, the Santa Leocadia. After a pursuit of 210 miles (340 km), the Canada overtook the Santa Leocadia on the morning of 1 May.

After a running fight, which lasted up to an hour and a half, and in heavy seas which prevented the Canada from opening her lower deck ports, the frigate surrendered. She had suffered heavy casualties, with 80 men killed and 106 wounded (nearly half her complement), including her captain, Don Francisco Wenthuisen, who lost an arm. The Canada had one of the trunnions of a lower deck gun shot off and suffered ten casualties.

What was remarkable about Santa Leocadia is that she was noted before the battle as being a remarkably fast-sailing ship. The discovery that she was coppered when she was captured came in some ways as a surprise. It was now known to the British Admiralty that other navies had decided to copper their ships as well as the Royal Navy. The Santa Leocadia was the first in the Spanish service that was coppered, and she was added to the British navy under the same name.
