= Spanish ship Conde de Regla (1786) =

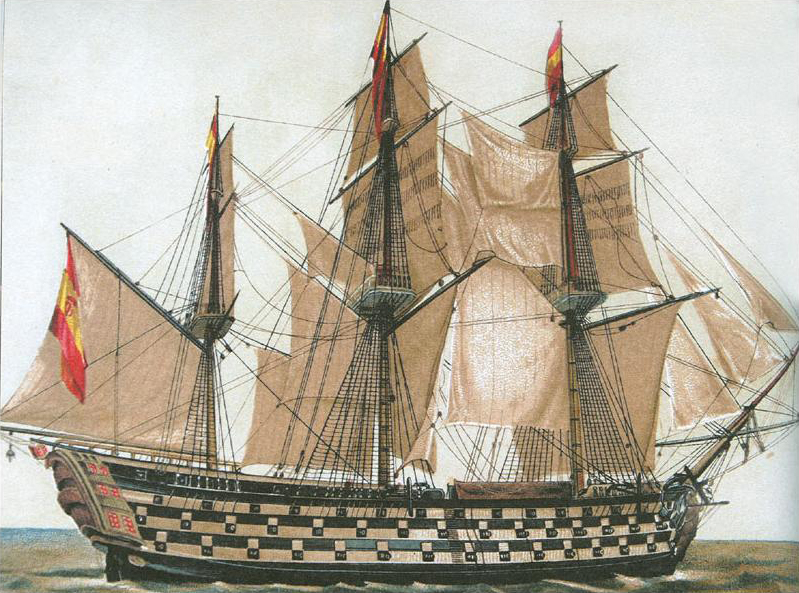
- Conde de Regla's sister ship Santa Ana

History

Spain
- Name: Conde de Regla
- Builder: Havana
- Launched: 4 November 1786
- Fate: Broken up Port Mahon, 1810
- Notes: Participated in: Battle of Cape St Vincent (1797)

General characteristics
- Class & type: Santa Ana-class ship of the line
- Tonnage: 2,112 tonnes
- Length: 56.14 m
- Beam: 15.5 m
- Draught: 7.37 m
- Sail plan: Full-rigged ship
- Complement: 801
- Armament: On launch: 30 × 36-pounder cannon; 32 × 24-pounder cannon; 32 × 12-pounder cannon; 18 × 8-pounder cannon
- Armour: None

Conde de Regla was a 112-gun ship of the line of the Spanish Navy built at Havana in 1786 to plans by José Romero y Fernández de Landa. One of the eight very large ships of the line of the Santa Ana class, also known as los Meregildos. Conde de Regla served in the Spanish Navy for three decades throughout the French Revolutionary and Napoleonic Wars. Although she was a formidable part of the Spanish battlefleet throughout these conflicts, the only major action Conde de Regla participated in was the Battle of Cape St. Vincent in 1797.

== Construction ==
The Santa Ana class was built for the Spanish fleet in the 1780s and 1790s as heavy ships of the line, the equivalent of Royal Navy first rate ships. The other ships of the class were the Santa Ana, Mexicano, Salvador del Mundo, Real Carlos, San Hermenegildo, Reina María Luisa and Príncipe de Asturias. Three of the class were captured or destroyed during the French Revolutionary Wars.

Conde de Regla was constructed at Havana, funded by Pedro Romero de Terreros, Count of Regla, after whom the ship was named.

== History ==
Conde de Regla's sea-trials took place in 1787 under Juan de Lángara y Huarte, who reported that the ship sailed smoothly and the gun batteries operated efficiently. In 1797, Conde de Regla was with the Spanish fleet which fought the British at the Battle of Cape St. Vincent. The Spanish fleet was defeated and four ships of the line were captured; Conde de Regla survived the battle but suffered losses of 9 killed, including Brigadier Claude-François Renart d'Amblimont and 16 seriously wounded, including Commandant Jerónimo Bravo.

Between 1799 and 1801, Conde de Regla was with the combined French and Spanish fleet stationed at Brest after participating in the Croisière de Bruix campaign. During the Napoleonic Wars Conde de Regla was laid up at Arsenal de la Carraca. In mid-1810, she was in poor repair and with Spanish authorities lacking the materials to repair her Conde de Regla was broken up at Mahón, with her timbers being used as firewood by the local population.
