= HMS San Nicolas =

Ship of the line of the Royal Navy

- San Nicolás de Bari (centre) at the Battle of Cape St. Vincent

History

Spain
- Name: San Nicolás
- Captured: By the British at the Battle of Cape St. Vincent on 14 February 1797

United Kingdom
- Name: HMS San Nicolas
- Acquired: 14 February 1797
- Reclassified: Prison ship in 1800
- Fate: Sold on 3 November 1814

General characteristics
- Type: 80-gun ship of the line
- Tons burthen: 1,942 tons
- Length: 180 ft (55 m)
- Beam: 49 ft 6 in (15.09 m)
- Propulsion: Sails
- Sail plan: Full-rigged ship
- Armament: 80 guns

San Nicolás de Bari was an 80-gun ship of the line of the Spanish Navy.

She was present at the Battle of Cape St. Vincent on 14 February 1797, when she was boarded by a number of British sailors from HMS Captain led by Horatio Nelson. They successfully took the ship, then crossed from her decks to board San José, which had come to the aid of San Nicolás de Bari, but had become encumbered with her. Nelson and his men then captured San José as well.

Admiral Sir John Jervis put Commander Peter Puget, in HMS Raven in charge of San Nicolás de Bari, still crewed by Spaniards. Puget suppressed a mutiny and delivered the crew to Lisbon.

San Nicolás de Bari was commissioned into the Royal Navy as HMS San Nicolas. She became a prison ship in 1800, and was sold for breaking up on 3 November 1814.

== Bibliography ==
- Colledge, J. J.; Warlow, Ben & Bush, Steve (2020). Ships of the Royal Navy: The Complete Record of all Fighting Ships of the Royal Navy from the 15th Century to the Present (5th revised and updated ed.). Seaforth Publishing. ISBN 978-1-5267-9327-0.
- Winfield, Rif (2008) [2005]. British Warships in the Age of Sail 1793–1817: Design, Construction, Careers and Fates (2nd, revised ed.). Seaforth. ISBN 978-1-84415-717-4.
- Winfield, Rif; Tredrea, John M.; García-Torralba Pérez, Enrique & Blasco Felip, Manuel (2023). Spanish Warships in the Age of Sail 1700—1860: Design, Construction, Careers and Fates. Seaforth Publishing. ISBN 978-1-5267-9078-1.
