= Spanish ship Mexicano =

112-gun three-decker ship of the line

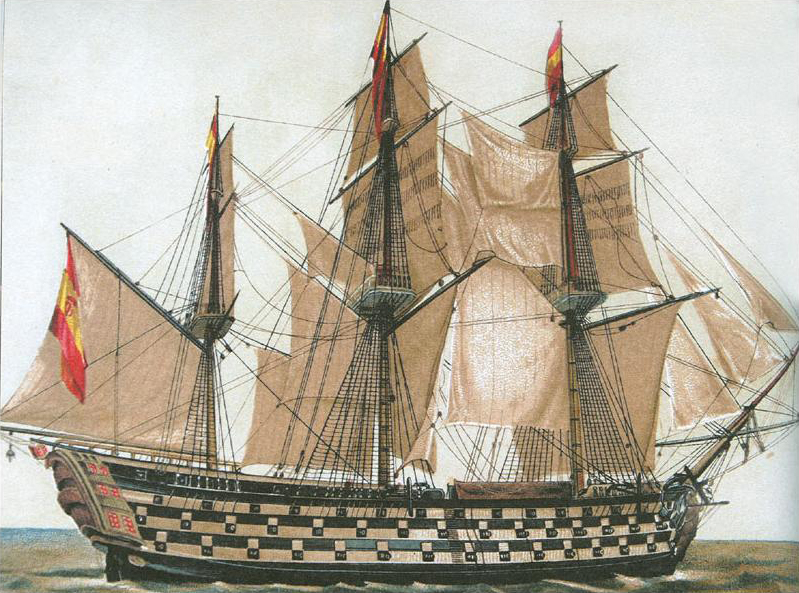
- Mexicano's sister ship Santa Ana

History

Spain
- Name: Mexicano
- Builder: Havanna
- Launched: 20 January 1786
- Fate: Sold, Ferrol, 1815
- Notes: Participated in: Battle of Cape St. Vincent (1797)

General characteristics
- Class & type: Santa Ana-class ship of the line
- Tonnage: 2,112 tonnes
- Length: 56.14 m
- Beam: 15.5 m
- Draught: 7.37 m
- Sail plan: Full-rigged ship
- Armament: On launch: 30 × 36-pounder cannon; 32 × 24-pounder cannon; 32 × 12-pounder cannon; 18 × 8-pounder cannon

Mexicano (or Mejicano) was a 112-gun ship of the line of the Spanish Navy built at Havana in 1786 to plans by José Romero y Fernández de Landa. One of the eight very large ships of the line of the Santa Ana class, also known as los Meregildos. Mexicano served in the Spanish Navy for three decades throughout the French Revolutionary and Napoleonic Wars, finally being sold at Ferrol in 1815. Although she was a formidable part of the Spanish battlefleet throughout these conflicts, the only major action Mexicano participated in was the Battle of Cape St. Vincent in 1797.

== Construction ==
The Santa Ana class was built for the Spanish Navy in the 1780s and 1790s as heavy ships of the line, the equivalent of Royal Navy first-rates. The other ships of the class were the Santa Ana, Conde de Regla, Salvador del Mundo, Real Carlos, San Hermenegildo, Reina María Luisa and Príncipe de Asturias. Three of the class were captured or destroyed during the French Revolutionary Wars. Mexicano was constructed at Havanna, built over eleven months in 1785 at a cost of 328,000 pesos, most of which was supplied by the Cabildo of New Spain, known as Mexico and from where the ship took its name.

== History ==
The maiden voyage of Mexicano was made from Havanna to Ferrol with a light armament of 80 guns under Captain Miguel Felix Goycoechea, who reported that the ship sailed smoothly and with endurance.

In 1797, Mexicano was with the Spanish fleet which fought the British at the Battle of Cape St. Vincent. The Spanish fleet was defeated and four ships were lost, although Mexicano survived the battle with losses of 25 killed, including Captain Francisco de Herrara and 46 seriously wounded. Between 1799 and 1801, Mexicano was with the combined French and Spanish fleet blocked in Brest after participating in the Croisière de Bruix campaign. By the end of the Napoleonic Wars Mexicano was laid up at Ferrol, her hull in a bad condition, and at the end of the war the ship was sold out of service and broken up.

== Bibliography ==
- Winfield, Rif; Tredrea, John M; García-Torralba Pérez, Enrique & Blasco Felip, Manuel (2023). Spanish Warships in the Age of Sail 1700—1860: Design, Construction, Careers and Fates. Barnsley, UK: Seaforth Publishing. ISBN 978-1-5267-9078-1.
- This article is based on a translation of an article from the Spanish Wikipedia.
