= Claude-François Renart d'Amblimont =

French naval officer

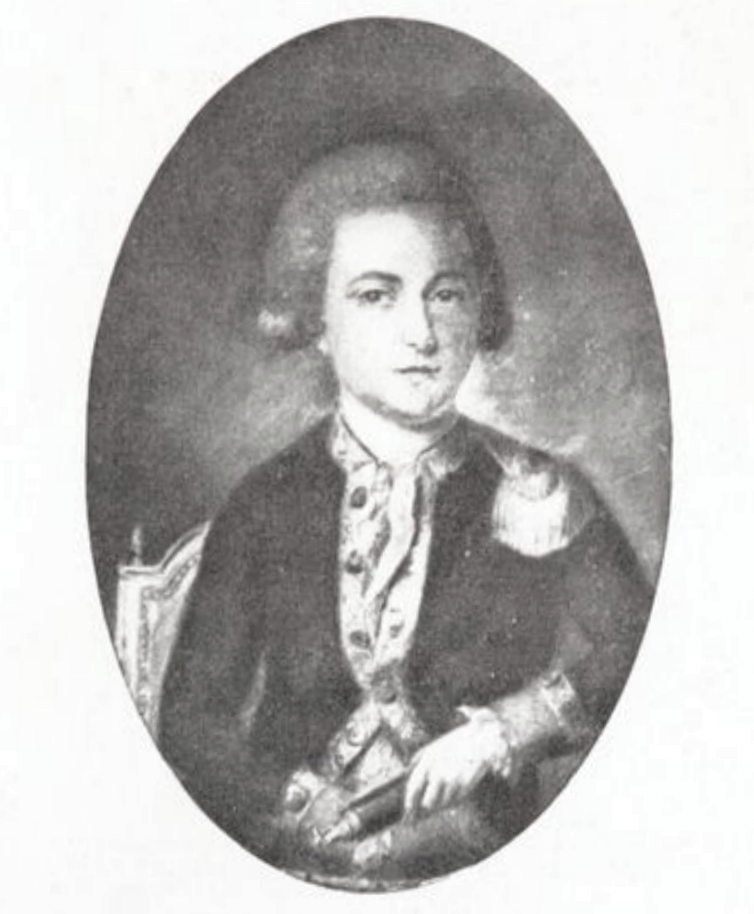
- Born: 1736
- Died: 14 February 1797 (aged 60–61) Conde de Regla, near Cape St. Vincent
- Branch: French Navy; Spanish Navy
- Rank: Counter admiral
- Conflicts: Battle of Martinique; Battle of the Saintes; Battle of Cape St. Vincent

Claude-Marguerite François Renart de Fuchsamberg d'Amblimont (1736 — 14 February 1797) was a French naval officer who served in the French Navy and Spanish Navy and saw action in the American Revolutionary War and the French Revolutionary Wars. He was killed in action at the Battle of Cape St. Vincent in 1797 while commanding the Spanish ship of the line Conde de Regla.

== Biography ==
Amblimont was born to the family of Chef d'Escadre Claude-Thomas Renart d'Amblimont, and was the grandchild on Thomas-Claude Renart de Fuchsamberg Amblimont. He joined the Navy as a Garde-Marine in on 20 December 1751.

He was promoted to Ensign in 1754, and to Lieutenant in 1760.

In 1770, he was made a Knight in the Order of Saint Louis.

On 18 February 1772, he was promoted to Captain. In 1776, he was in command of the frigate Diligente, taking part in the exercises of the Escadre d'évolution.

He captained the 64-gun Vengeur in October 1778 when she and the frigate Belle Poule captured the privateer St Peters.

In 1757, he fought to repel the Louisbourg Expedition.

He invented a new type of Capstan.

In 1779, he was promoted to Brigadier. In 1781, he was given command of the 74-gun Hercule, part of the squadron under Guichen and Orvilliers. He took part in the Battle of Martinique on 17 April 1780. Later, he transferred on Brave. He took part in Battle of the Saintes on 12 April 1782, where he was taken prisoner by the British.

On 20 August 1784, he was promoted to Chef d'Escadre. In 1788, he authored Tactique Navale, a well-received book on naval tactics. He was promoted to Contre-amiral on 1 January 1792.

Amblimont then joined the Spanish Navy. He was given command of a division, with his flag on Conde de Regla. He was killed by a cannonball at the Battle of Cape St. Vincent on 14 February 1797.
