= Spanish ship Salvador del Mundo =

First rate ship of the line

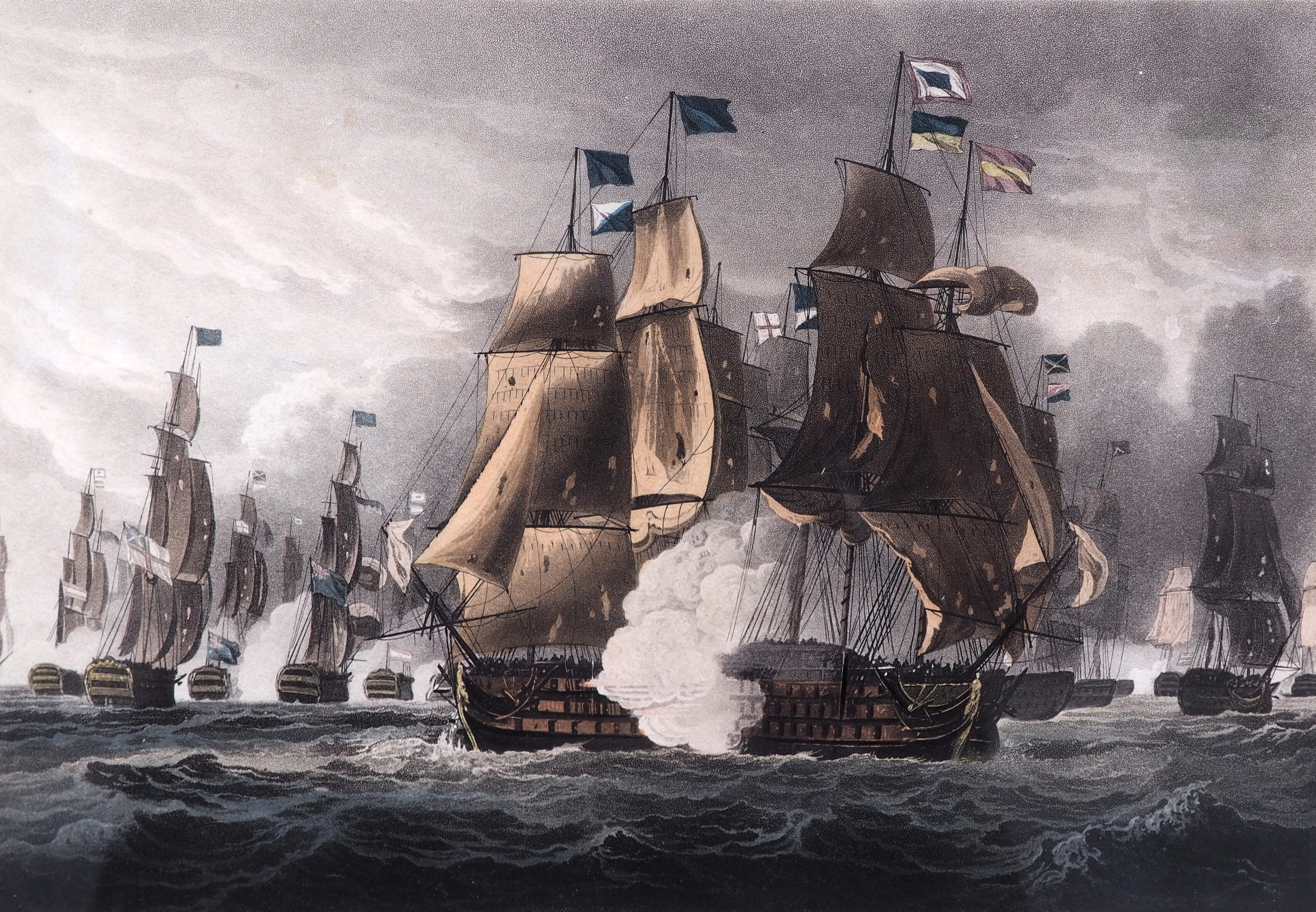
- Salvador del Mundo (centre-right) at the Battle of Cape St. Vincent

History

Spain
- Name: Salvador del Mundo
- Builder: Reales Astilleros de Esteiro, Ferrol
- Launched: 2 May 1787
- Captured: Captured by Royal Navy at the Battle of Cape St. Vincent
- Notes: Participated in: Battle of Cape St. Vincent (1797)

United Kingdom
- Name: HMS Salvador del Mundo
- Acquired: Captured on 14 February 1797
- Fate: Broken up in 1815

General characteristics
- Class & type: Santa Ana-class ship of the line
- Tonnage: 2,112 tonnes
- Length: 56.14 m
- Beam: 15.5 m
- Draught: 7.37 m
- Sail plan: Full-rigged ship
- Complement: 801
- Armament: On launch: 30 × 36-pounder cannon; 32 × 24-pounder cannon; 32 × 12-pounder cannon; 18 × 8-pounder cannon
- Armour: None

Salvador del Mundo was a 112-gun ship of the line of the Spanish Navy. Launched in 1787, she was built at Ferrol to plans by José Romero y Fernández de Landa and was one of the eight ships of the line of the Santa Ana-class. Salvador del Mundo served in the French Revolutionary Wars until she was captured at the Battle of Cape St. Vincent by a British fleet on 14 February 1797. The ship was taken into Royal Navy service as HMS Salvador del Mundo and served in the Napoleonic Wars on harbour duties until she was sold and broken up in 1815.

== Construction ==
The Santa Ana class was built for the Spanish fleet in the 1780s and 1790s as heavy ships of the line, the equivalent of Royal Navy first rate ships. The other ships of the class were the Santa Ana, Mexicano, San Hermenegildo, Conde de Regla, Real Carlos, Reina María Luisa and Príncipe de Asturias. Three of the class, including Salvador del Mundo, were captured or destroyed during the French Revolutionary Wars.

== History ==
In 1797, Salvador del Mundo participated in the Battle of Cape St. Vincent against the Royal Navy on 14 February under Brigadier Antonio Yepes. During the battle, Salvador del Mundo was dismasted and badly damaged before being captured by the British, with losses of 41 killed, including Yepes, and 124 wounded. William Prowse took command of the prize ship. Three other Spanish ships were captured during the battle.

Salvador de Mundo was taken into the Royal Navy under her own name and subsequently served throughout the remainder of the French Revolutionary Wars and the ensuing Napoleonic Wars on harbour duties. A court martial was held aboard her on 1 September 1804 to try an Irish sailor accused of "distributing seditious songs" among the crew. The sailor was convicted and sentenced to 500 lashes and a two-year term in Marshalsea prison.

At the conclusion of the wars, Salvador del Mundo was decommissioned and broken up.

== Bibliography ==
- Grocott, Terence (1997). Shipwrecks of the Revolutionary and Napoleonic Eras. Chatham Publishing. ISBN 1-86176-030-2.
- Winfield, Rif (2007). British Warships in the Age of Sail 1714–1792: Design, Construction, Careers and Fates. Seaforth Publishing. ISBN 978-1-84415-700-6.
- Winfield, Rif; Tredrea, John M; García-Torralba Pérez, Enrique & Blasco Felip, Manuel (2023). Spanish Warships in the Age of Sail 1700—1860: Design, Construction, Careers and Fates. Seaforth Publishing. ISBN 978-1-5267-9078-1.
