= Spanish ship Reina María Luisa =

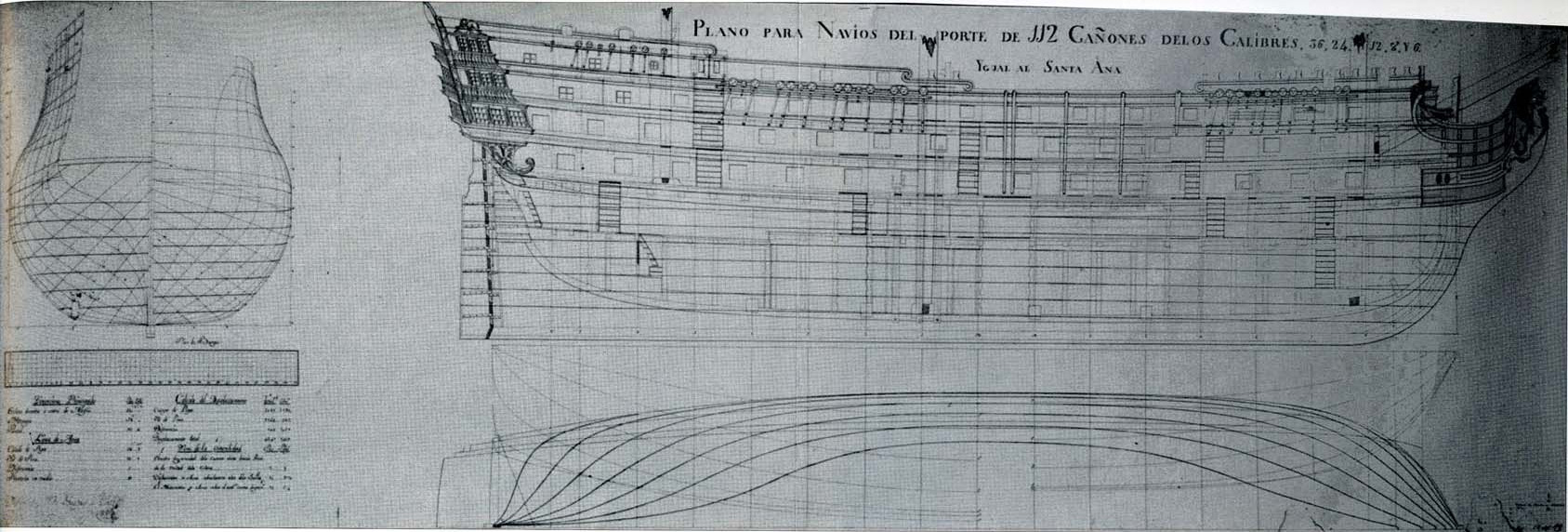
- Ship plan of Reina María Luisa

History

Spain
- Name: Reina María Luisa
- Builder: Reales Astilleros de Esteiro, Ferrol
- Launched: 12 September 1791
- Renamed: Fernando VII, 1809
- Fate: Foundered off Béjaïa, 10 December 1815

General characteristics
- Class & type: Santa Ana-class ship of the line
- Tonnage: 4,341 tons displacements
- Tons burthen: 2,308 tons
- Length: 58.506 m
- Beam: 16.159 m
- Draught: 8.024 m
- Depth of hold: 7.542 ms
- Sail plan: Full-rigged ship
- Complement: 801
- Armament: On launch: 30 × 36-pounder cannon; 32 × 24-pounder cannon; 32 × 12-pounder cannon; 18 × 8-pounder cannon

Reina María Luisa was a 112-gun ship of the line of the Spanish Navy built at Ferrol, Spain, in 1791 to plans by José Romero y Fernández de Landa. One of the eight very large ships of the line (navíos in Spanish) of the Santa Ana class, also known as Los Meregildos. Reina María Luisa served in the Spanish navy for three decades throughout the French Revolutionary and Napoleonic Wars, being renamed Fernando VII in 1809 and wrecked off Béjaïa in 1815. Although she was a formidable part of the Spanish battlefleet throughout these conflicts, she did not participate in any major operations.

== Construction ==
The Santa Ana class was built for the Spanish fleet in the 1780s and 1790s as heavy ships of the line, the equivalent of Royal Navy first rate ships. The other ships of the class were the Santa Ana, Mexicano, Salvador del Mundo, Real Carlos, San Hermenegildo, Conde de Regla and Príncipe de Asturias. Three of the class were captured or destroyed during the French Revolutionary Wars. Reina María Luisa was named for Queen Maria Luisa.

An error during the construction of Reina María Luisa meant that she was given a larger keel than described in the plans, resulting in a slightly deeper draft in the stern and shallower in the bow.

== History ==
In 1793 during the War of the Pyrenees, Reina María Luisa was the flagship of the Spanish fleet commanded by Juan de Lángara operating at the Siege of Toulon, alongside the British fleet under Vice-Admiral Samuel Hood. Reina María Luisa was subsequently engaged at the action of 14 February 1795.

In 1809, Reina María Luisa was renamed Fernando VII. In 1810, under the command of Manuel de Posadas, Fernando VII sailed from Gibraltar to Port Mahon, suffered a leak that could not be detected and upon arrival, was disarmed. In 1815, in poor condition, Fernando VII was ordered to travel from Port Mahon to Cartagena on 4 December with a reduced crew partly made up of American sailors from USS United States, which accompanied Fernando VII on the journey alongside USS Ontario and HMS Boyne. United States and Fernando VII separated from the other ships south of the island of Cabrera, in good weather but on 6 December a heavy storm began. Despite jettisoning 13 guns and an anchor to relieve weight, the leaking ship began to founder and sank on 10 December off the African coast near Béjaïa. Although all of the crew were saved, they were held prisoner at Algiers until the Spanish returned an Algerian ship recently seized off Spain. The exchange occurred in May 1816, following which the crew were acquitted by a court martial for the loss of the ship.

== Bibliography ==
- Winfield, Rif; Tredrea, John M; García-Torralba Pérez, Enrique & Blasco Felip, Manuel (2023). Spanish Warships in the Age of Sail 1700—1860: Design, Construction, Careers and Fates. Barnsley, UK: Seaforth Publishing. ISBN 978-1-5267-9078-1.
