= José de Córdoba y Ramos =

Spanish Navy officer and explorer (1732–1815)

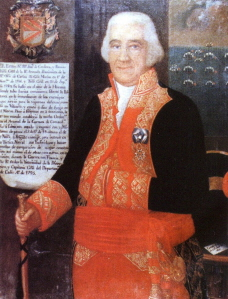
Portrait of Córdoba

Lieutenant-General José de Córdoba y Ramos (September 26, 1732 – April 3, 1815) was a Spanish Navy officer and explorer who served in the War of Jenkins' Ear, Seven Years' War, American Revolutionary War and French Revolutionary Wars.

== Biography ==
Born into a family of sailors, he was the son of Don Ramón Antonio de Córdova-Lasso de la Vega y Córdova-Lasso de la Vega, and Doña Mariana Josefa Ramos de Garay y Mexiá.

Córdoba took to the seas at the age of 13. After sailing under Andrés Reggio, he was appointed to sail his own ship from Cádiz to Manila Bay via the Cape of Good Hope. In command of the frigate Astrea, he set sail in April 1770 with a crew of 289 men. Arriving in Manila Bay, he affirmed that he only had two patients with scurvy, pointing out that the low incidence of scurvy was due to the gaspacho that he ordered to be given to the crew. Setting course back to Spain on January 6, 1771, he arrived at the Isla de León on August 1, 1771. Later in his career he sailed several times to the Philippines, where he oversaw improvements in the design of the Manila Galleon.

On September 21, 1789, he became Teniente general (lieutenant general) of the Navy. At the outbreak of war with Britain in 1796, he was put in command of the Spanish fleet. While in command of the fleet he suffered a serious defeat at the Battle of Cape St Vincent (1797) on board the Santísima Trinidad (which was successfully attacked by Commodore Horatio Nelson and after surrendering Córdoba's flagship was only saved because of the intervention of two other Spanish ships).

After St Vincent, Córdoba was dismissed from the Spanish Navy and forbidden from appearing at court. After Napoleon's France attacked Spain in 1808, the political landscape shifted dramatically. While Córdoba was technically reinstated onto the navy's retired list after an appeal, he was in his late 70s by this point and was never given an active military command again.

He lived the rest of his life in comfortable retirement in Cadiz. Lord Byron met the Admiral and his family when passing through Cadiz in 1809.

== Family ==
He married Julia de Rojas and they had one son, José de Córdoba y Rojas, a loyalist commander in the Spanish American wars of independence. He was also the grandfather of:

- Luis Fernández de Córdova, general in the Carlist Wars, diplomat and Marquis of Mendigorría
- Fernando Fernández de Córdova, fought in the Carlist Wars, politician and Prime minister of Spain for one day.

== Sources ==
Content in this article is translated from the existing Spanish Wikipedia article at es:José de Córdova y Ramos; see its history for attribution.

- (in Spanish) Pedro Sánchez Núñez, Venturas y desventuras de un marino utrerano: José de Córdova y Ramos, 2002, 348 pages
- (in Spanish) Francisco de Paula Pavía y Pavía, Galería biográfica de los generales de marina, jefes y personajes notables que figuraron en la misma corporación desde 1700 a 1868, Volume 1, Impr. J. Lopez, 1873, p. 343 and following.
- (in Spanish) Google Books Catalogo descriptivo de los objetos que contiene El Museo Naval, Impr. de L. Beltran, Madrid, 1862, p. 20

== Links ==
- (in Spanish) José de Córdova y Ramos: Circunvaló el globo terráqueo, article in ABC Journal, Seville edition by Ignacio Fernández Vial.
- Kurzbiographie Vizeadmiral Jose de Cordoba y Ramos de Garay
