= Battle of Cape St. Vincent (1797) =

1797 battle of the War of the First Coalition

- Part of the Anglo-Spanish War and War of the First Coalition
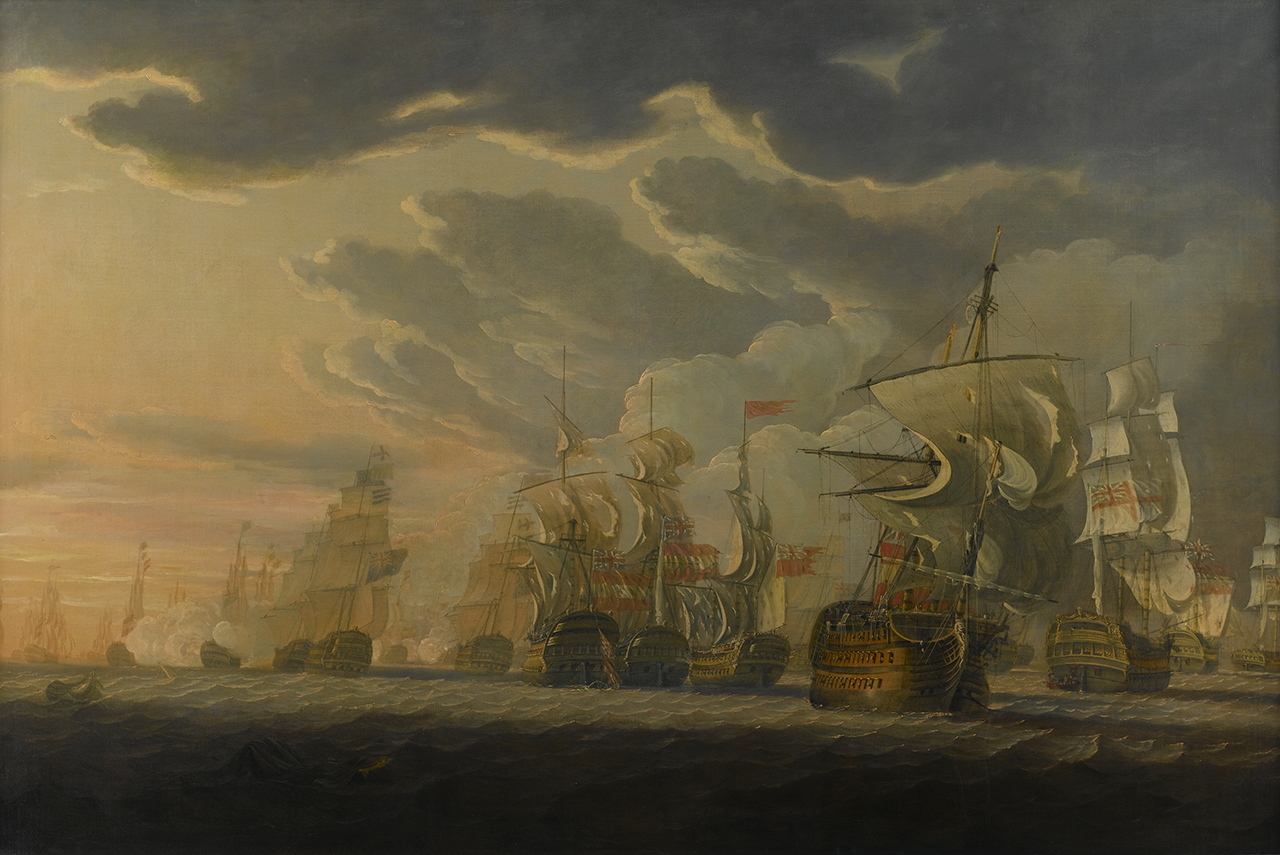
- 1798 painting of the battle
Date	14 February 1797
Location	Off Cape St. Vincent, Atlantic Ocean 37°01′30″N 8°59′40″W
Result	British victory

Belligerents
Great Britain	Spain

Commanders and leaders
Sir John Jervis; William Waldegrave; Charles Thompson; William Parker; Horatio Nelson (WIA)	José de Córdoba y Ramos; Francisco Javier Morales; Francisco Winthuysen †; Juan de Mondragón; Conde de Amblimont †

Strength
15 ships of the line 5 frigates 1 sloop 1 cutter	25 ships of the line 7 frigates 1 brig 4 merchantmen

Casualties and losses
73 killed 227 wounded	430 killed 856 wounded 3,000 captured 4 ships of the line captured

The Battle of Cape St. Vincent was a fleet action fought on 14 February 1797 between the British and Spanish navies off Cape St. Vincent in Portugal as part of the War of the First Coalition. In one of the opening battles of the recently declared war between Britain and Spain, a British fleet under Admiral of the Blue Sir John Jervis defeated a larger Spanish fleet under Lieutenant-general José de Córdoba y Ramos which had left Cádiz to confront the British navy. Commodore Horatio Nelson distinguished himself in the battle by boarding and capturing two Spanish ships of the line.

Córdoba's fleet ultimately suffered 430 killed and 856 wounded while having 4 ships of the line and 3,000 men captured, while the British suffered only 73 killed and 227 wounded. The defeated Spanish fleet returned to Cádiz where it was blockaded until the 1802 Peace of Amiens, while the 3,000 prisoners were landed in Portugal. Jervis and his officers were rewarded for the victory, which allowed British forces to return to the Mediterranean after evacuating the region in 1796, while Córdoba was dismissed from the Spanish Navy and forbidden from appearing at court.

== Background ==
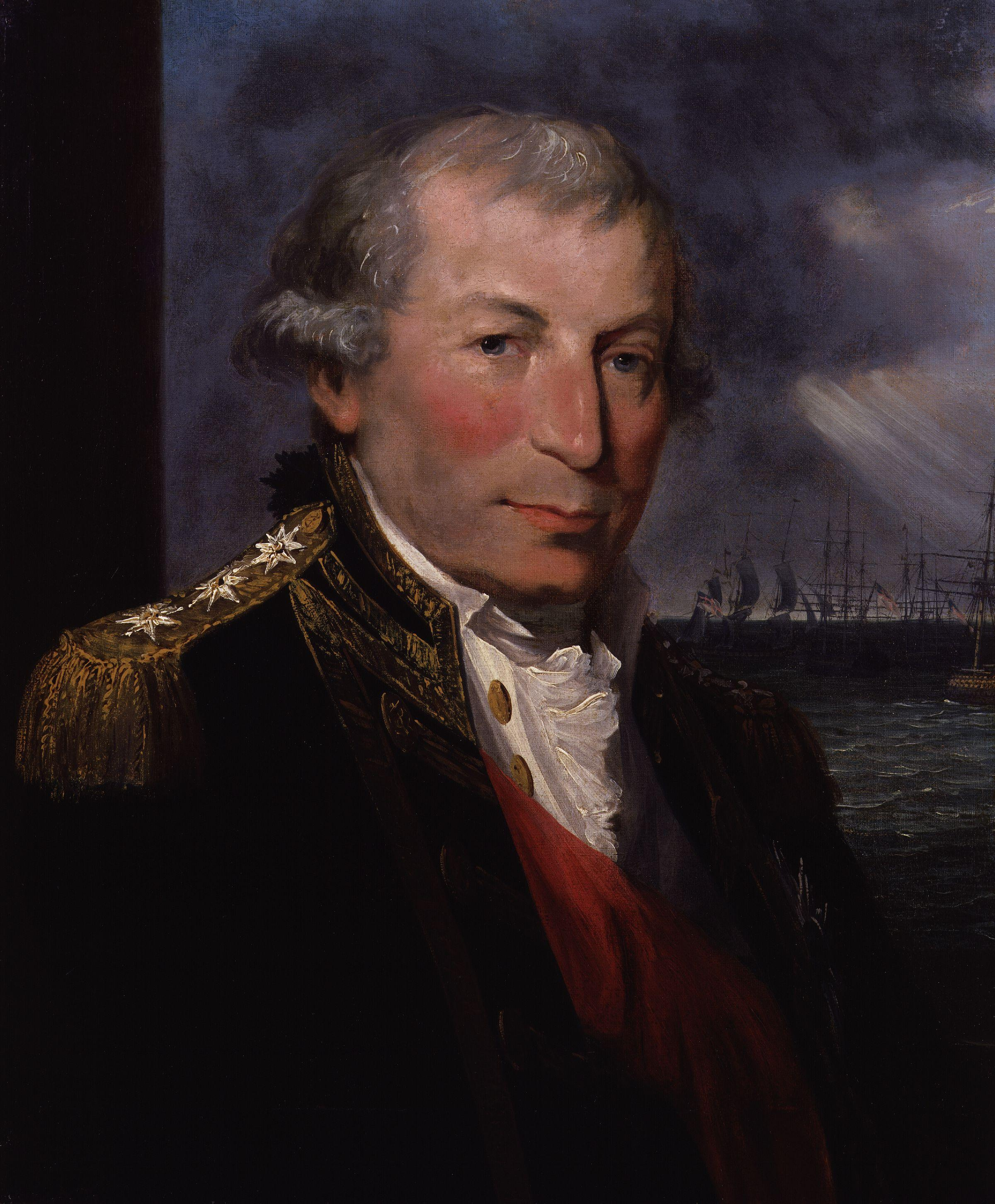
Sir John Jervis

After the signing of the Treaty of San Ildefonso in 1796 allying Spanish and French forces against Great Britain, the Royal Navy blockaded Spain in 1797, impairing communications with its empire. The Spanish declaration of war on Britain and Portugal in October 1796 made the British position in the Mediterranean untenable. The combined Franco-Spanish fleet of 38 ships of the line heavily outnumbered the British Mediterranean Fleet of fifteen ships of the line, forcing the British to evacuate their positions in first Corsica and then Elba. Early in 1797, the Spanish fleet of 27 ships of the line lay at Cartagena on the Mediterranean Sea. The Spanish planned to join the French fleet at Brest and escort a large merchant convoy, carrying mainly mercury for gold and silver production, from Cádiz. The convoy entered Cádiz harbour along with warships Neptuno, Terrible and Bahama, prior to running into the British force.

A Spanish fleet under Lieutenant-general José de Córdoba y Ramos left Cartagena on 1 February and might have reached Cádiz safely but for a fierce Levanter, the easterly wind, blowing between Gibraltar and Cádiz, which pushed the Spanish fleet further out into the Atlantic than intended. As the winds died down, the fleet began working its way back to Cádiz. In the meantime, the British Mediterranean Fleet, under Admiral of the Blue Sir John Jervis, had sailed from the Tagus with ten ships of the line to try to intercept the Spanish fleet. On 6 February, Jervis was joined off Cape St. Vincent by a reinforcement of five ships of the line from the Channel Fleet under Rear-Admiral William Parker. On 11 February, the British frigate HMS Minerve, under the command of Commodore Horatio Nelson, passed through the Spanish fleet unseen due to heavy fog. Nelson reached the British fleet of fifteen ships off Spain on 13 February, and told the location of the Spanish fleet to Jervis, commanding the fleet from his flagship Victory. In the fog, Nelson had not been able to count the Spanish ships, but Jervis's squadron immediately sailed to intercept them as they continued toward Cádiz. Early on the 14th, Jervis learnt that the Spanish fleet was 35 miles to windward.

== Battle ==
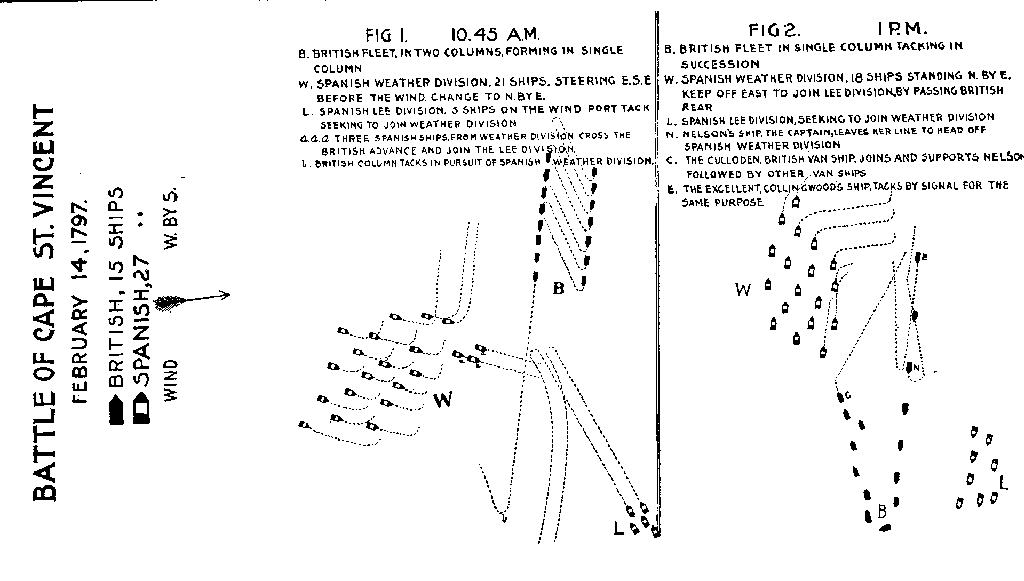
Plan of the fleet deployment during the Battle of Cape St. Vincent, 14 February 1797 by Alfred Thayer Mahan

Though Jervis still had no idea of the size of the fleet he was up against, during the night came the sounds for which he had been waiting: Spanish signal guns in the fog. At 2:50 a.m. came the report that the Spanish fleet was some fifteen miles distant. By 5:30 a.m., Niger reported them closer still, as a cold and foggy February dawn rose on the British fleet, formed in two lines of battle. Jervis turned to his officers on the quarterdeck of Victory and said, "A victory to England is very essential at this moment." Jervis put Captain Thomas Troubridge in Culloden in the lead. At 6:30 a.m., Culloden signalled that she could see five enemy sail to the south east, and along with Blenheim and Prince George turned toward the Spanish ships. As they loomed up out of the fog, a signal lieutenant in Barfleur described them as "thumpers, looming like Beachy Head in a fog." On the quarterdeck of Victory, Jervis, Captain Robert Calder and Captain Benjamin Hallowell counted the enemy ships: the British were outnumbered nearly two-to-one.

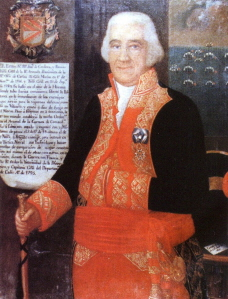
José de Córdoba

It would be difficult to disengage, and the situation would only get worse were the Spanish fleet to join up with the French: Jervis decided to continue. Hearing this, the Canadian Captain Hallowell became so excited he thumped the Admiral on the back, "That's right Sir John, and, by God, we'll give them a damn good licking!" The Spanish were formed in two loose columns, one of about 18 ships to windward and the other, of about nine ships, somewhat closer to the British. At about 10:30 a.m., the Spanish ships in the weather column were seen to wear ship and turn to port. This gave the impression that they might form a line and pass along the weather column of the British fleet, exposing the smaller British column to the fire of the larger Spanish division. At 11:00 a.m., Jervis ordered: "Form in a line of battle ahead and astern of Victory as most convenient." When this was completed the British fleet had formed a single line of battle, sailing south to pass between the two Spanish columns. At 11:12 a.m., Jervis made his next signal: "Engage the enemy" and then at 11:30 a.m.: "Admiral intends to pass through enemy lines". The Battle of Cape St. Vincent had begun.

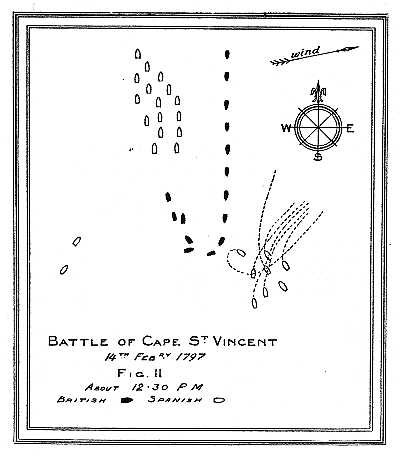
The Battle of Cape St. Vincent fleet deployment at about 12:30 p.m.

To the British advantage, the Spanish fleet was formed into two groups and was unprepared for battle, while the British were already in line. Jervis passed between the two Spanish groups, minimising the fire they could put into him, while letting him fire in both directions.

Culloden tacked to reverse her course and take after the Spanish column, followed by Blenheim, then Prince George. The Spanish lee division now put about to the port tack to break the British line at the point where the ships were tacking in succession. Orion came round untouched, but Colossus was going about when her foreyard and foretop yard were shot away. She was forced to wear ship instead of tack and the leading Spanish vessel came close enough to threaten her with a broadside. Saumarez in Orion saw the danger to Colossus and backed his sails to give covering fire. As Victory came to the tacking point, another attempt was made to break the British line, but Victory was too fast and Principe de Asturias received two raking broadsides as she tacked close to her. "We gave them their Valentine in style," later wrote a gunner in Goliath. As the last ship in the British line passed the Spanish, the British line had formed a U shape with Culloden in the lead and on the reverse course but chasing the rear of the Spanish. At this point the Spanish lee division bore up to make an effort to join their compatriots to windward. Had they managed this, the battle would have ended indecisively with the Spanish running for Cádiz and the British harrying their sterns in the manner of the Armada in 1588.

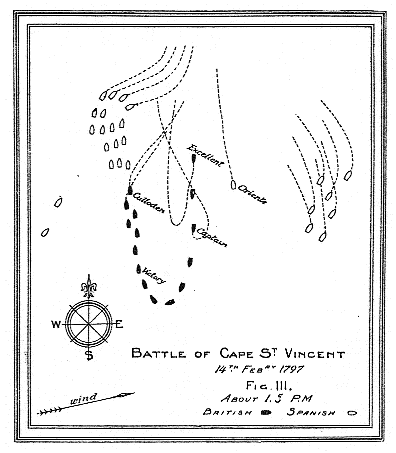
Situation around 1:05 p.m.

At 1:05 p.m., Jervis hoisted a signal:

Take suitable stations for mutual support and engage the enemy as coming up in succession

Nelson had returned to his ship Captain (a seventy-four) and was now towards the rear of the British line, much closer to the larger group. He saw that Jervis's manoeuvre could not be completed before the Spanish escaped, relatively unharmed. Taking the battle into his own hands, Nelson ordered Captain Ralph Willett Miller to wear ship and take Captain out of line to engage the smaller group.

As soon as the seventy-four was around, Nelson directed her to pass between Diadem and Excellent and ran across the bows of the Spanish ships forming the central group of the weather division. This group included the Santísima Trinidad, the largest ship afloat at the time and mounting 130 guns; the San José, 112; Salvador del Mundo, 112; San Nicolás, 84; San Ysidro, 74; and Mexicano, 112.

As a junior commander, Nelson was acting against Jervis's order to "form line ahead and astern of Victory", and using his own wide interpretation of "take suitable stations" in the later signal. Had his action failed, Nelson would have been subject to court-martial for disobeying orders in the face of the enemy, with subsequent demotion and disgrace.

At about 1:30 p.m., Culloden was gradually overhauling the Spanish rear and began a renewed but not very close engagement of the same group of ships. Jervis signalled his rearmost ship, Excellent, to come to the wind on the larboard tack and following this order, Collingwood brought his ship round to a position ahead of Culloden. After a few more minutes, Blenheim and Prince George came up behind and the group of British ships prevented the Spanish from grouping together.

The Captain was now under fire from as many as six Spanish ships, of which three were 112-gun three-deckers and a fourth Córdoba's 130-gun flagship Santísima Trinidad. At about 2:00 p.m., Culloden had stretched so far ahead as to cover the Captain from the heavy fire poured into her by the Spanish four-decker and her companions, as they hauled up and brought their broadsides to bear. Of the respite thus afforded to her, the Captain took immediate advantage, replenishing her lockers with shot and splicing and repairing her running rigging.

At about 2:30, Excellent, having been directed by signal to bear up, edged away and at 2:35, arriving abreast of the disabled Spanish three-decker Salvator del Mundo, engaged the latter on her weather bow for a few minutes; then passing on to the next Spanish ship, San Ysidro, whose three topmasts had already been shot away. This ship Captain Collingwood engaged closely until 2:50 when, after a gallant defence in her crippled state, San Ysidro hauled down the Spanish flag.

Moments later, Excellent and Diadem commenced an attack on Salvador del Mundo, with Excellent stationing herself on the weather bow and Diadem on the lee quarter of the Spanish three-decker. Salvador del Mundo, more or less disabled, saw Victory was about to pass close astern firing her bow guns and judiciously hauled down her flag.

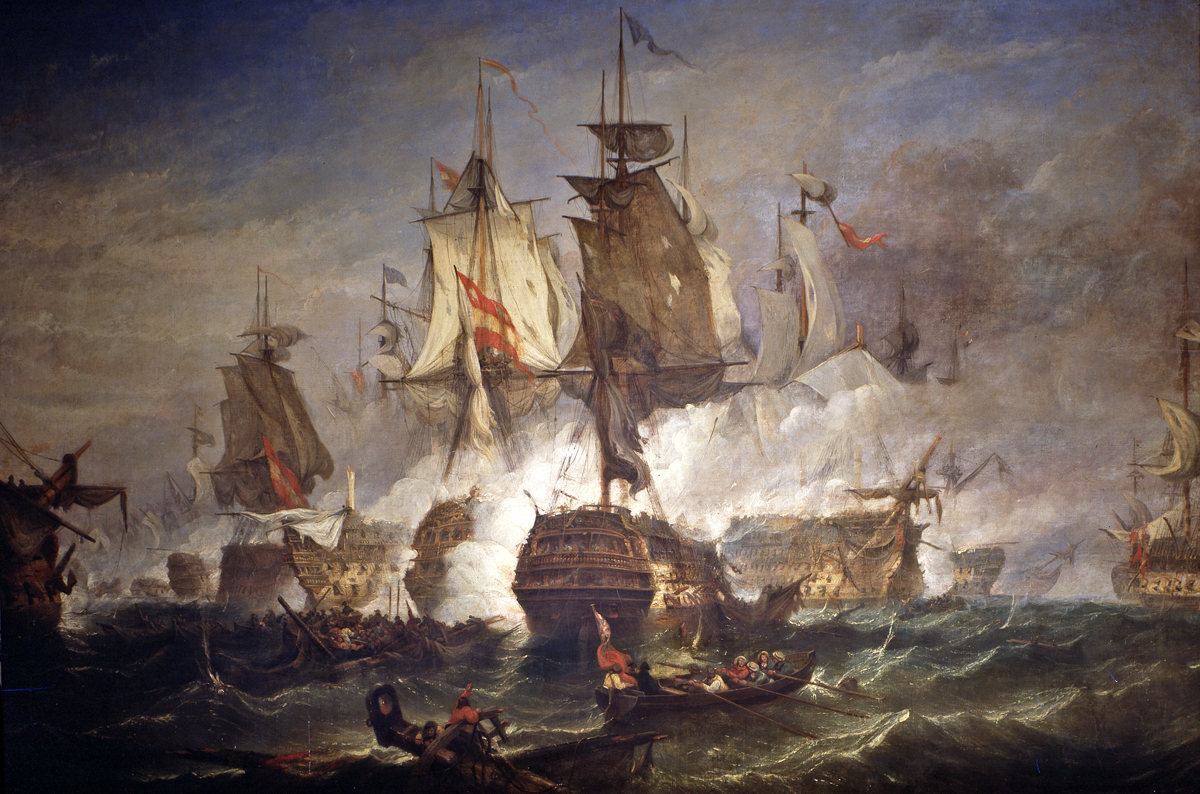
Battle off Cape St. Vincent, 1797 by William Adolphus Knell

By about 3:00, Excellent was already in close action with San Nicolás which, with foretop mast shot away, had encountered Captain. Excellent fired broadsides into San Nicolás and then made sail to clear ahead. To avoid Excellent, San Nicolás luffed up and ran foul of San José, which had suffered the loss of mizzen mast and other damage.

Captain was by now almost uncontrollable with her wheel shot away. At this point, her foretop mast fell over the side leaving her unmanageable, with little option but to board the Spanish vessels. Captain opened fire with her larboard broadside, and then put the helm over and hooked her larboard cat-head with the starboard quarter of San Nicolás.

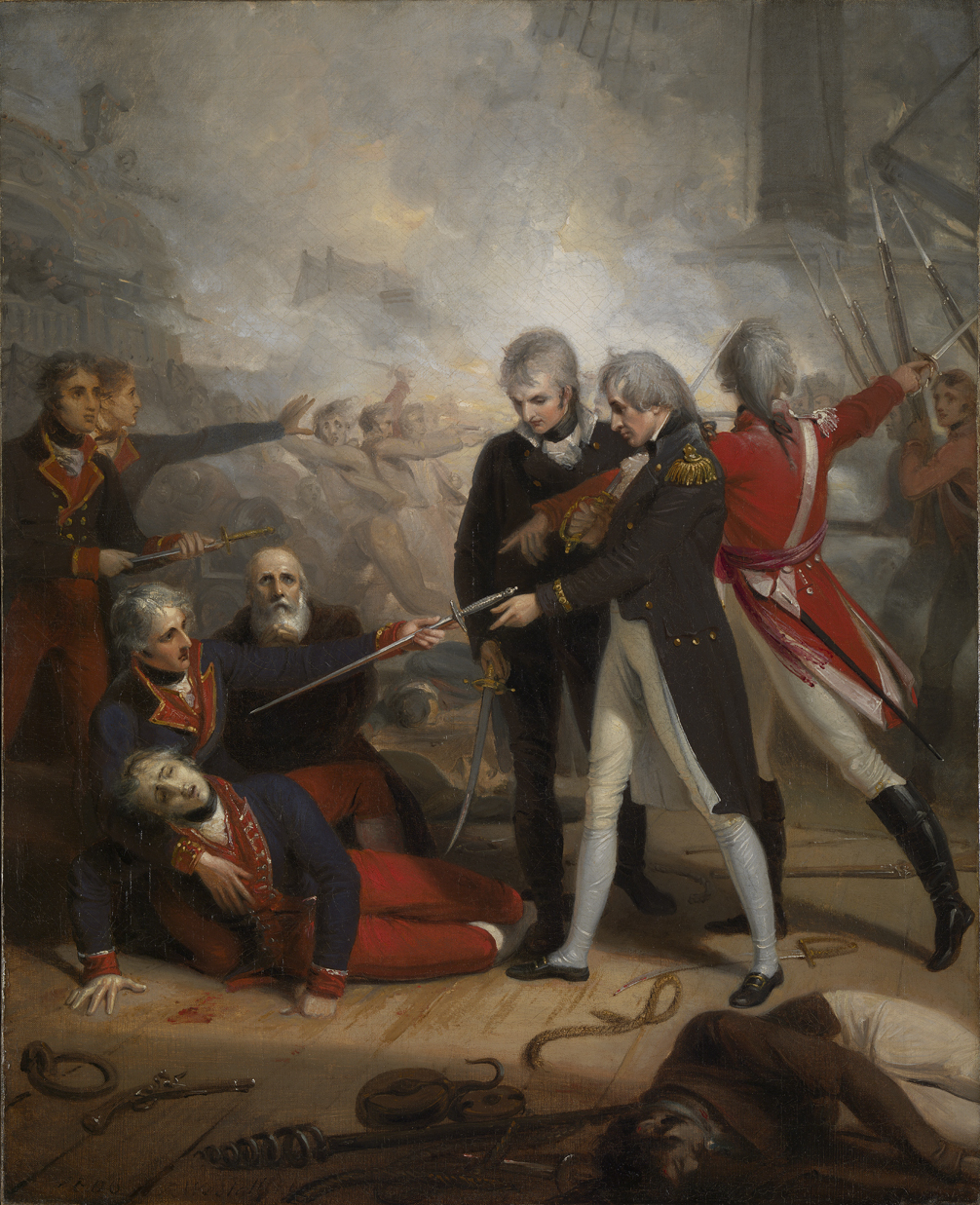
Nelson receives the surrender of the San Nicholas, portrait by Richard Westall

At 3:20, with a cry of "Westminster Abbey or Glorious Victory!", Nelson ordered his boarders to cross the first Spanish ship onto the second. He later wrote,

The soldiers of the 69th, with an alacrity which will ever do them credit, and Lieutenant Pearson of the same regiment, were almost the foremost on this service – the first man who jumped into the enemy's mizen chains was Commander Berry, late my First Lieutenant (Captain Miller was in the very act of going also, but I directed him to remain); he was supported from our sprit sail yard, which hooked in the mizen rigging. A soldier of the 69th Regiment having broken the upper quarter-gallery window, I jumped in myself, and was followed by others as fast as possible. I found the cabin doors fastened, and some Spanish officers fired their pistols: but having broke open the doors the soldiers fired, and the Spanish Brigadier fell, as retreating to the quarter-deck. I pushed immediately onwards for the quarter-deck, where I found Commander Berry in possession of the poop, and the Spanish ensign hauling down. I passed with my people, and Lieutenant Pearson, on the larboard gangway, to the forecastle, where I met two or three Spanish officers, prisoners to my seamen: they delivered me their swords. A fire of pistols, or muskets, opening from the stern gallery of the San Josef, I directed the soldiers to fire into her stern; and calling to Captain Miller, ordered him to send more men into the San Nicolas; and directed my people to board the first-rate, which was done in an instant, Commander Berry assisting me into the main chains. At this moment a Spanish officer looked over the quarter deck rail, and said they surrendered. From this most welcome intelligence, it was not long before I was on the quarter deck, where the captain, with a bow, presented me his sword, and said the admiral was dying of his wounds. I asked him on his honour if the ship was surrendered. He declared she was: on which I gave him my hand, and desired him to call on his officers and ship's company and tell them of it: which he did – and on the quarter deck of a Spanish first-rate, extravagant as the story may seem, did I receive the swords of vanquished Spaniards: which as I received, I gave to William Fearney, one of my bargemen, who put them, with the greatest sang-froid, under his arm.

Both Spanish vessels were successfully captured. This manoeuvre was so unusual and so widely admired in the Royal Navy that using one enemy ship to cross to another became known facetiously as "Nelson's patent bridge for boarding enemy vessels."

Infante Don Pelayo and San Pablo, which had been dispatched from de Córdoba's group at 8.00 a.m. to investigate guns heard to the north, now sailed in and bore down on Diadem and Excellent. By this time Santísima Trinidad had struck her colours to surrender, but Infante Don Pelayo under Ship-of-the-line Captain Cayetano Valdés y Flores came to Santísima Trinidad's assistance and the Spanish flagship re-raised her colours. By 4:00 p.m., Santísima Trinidad was relieved by two of her escorts and made away. Lieutenant-general Juan Joaquín Moreno de Mondragón's squadron put together the survivors of de Córdoba's group and turned to assist the harassed Spanish sails. Jervis signalled his fleet to cover the prizes and disabled vessels and at 4:15 the frigates were directed to take the prizes in tow. At 4:39 the fleet was ordered to take station in line astern of Victory. The battle was by now almost over with only some remaining skirmishing between Britannia, Orion and the departing Spanish covering Santísima Trinidad (which was to later be captured at the Battle of Trafalgar).

Nelson remained on board the captured Spanish ships while they were secured – and was cheered by the British ships as they passed. He returned to the Captain to thank Captain Miller and presented him with the sword of the captain of the San Nicolás.

At 5:00, Nelson shifted his pennant from the disabled Captain to Irresistible. Still black with smoke and with his uniform in shreds, Nelson went on board Victory where he was received on the quarter-deck by Jervis – "the Admiral embraced me, said he could not sufficiently thank me, and used every kind expression which could not fail to make me happy."

The British suffered 73 killed and 227 wounded during the battle, including Nelson. Spanish casualties were far higher, suffering 430 killed and 856 wounded; aboard San Nicolás alone 144 of her crew were killed in action.

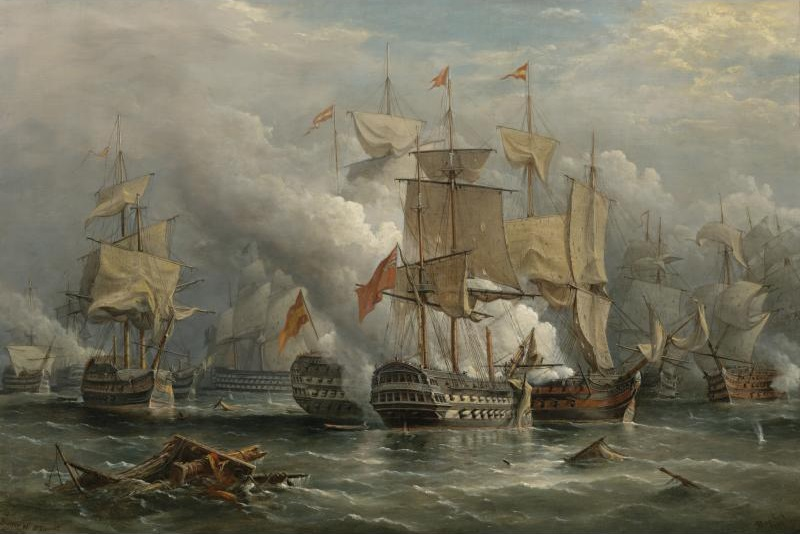
The Battle of Cape Saint Vincent, Richard Brydges Beechey, 1881

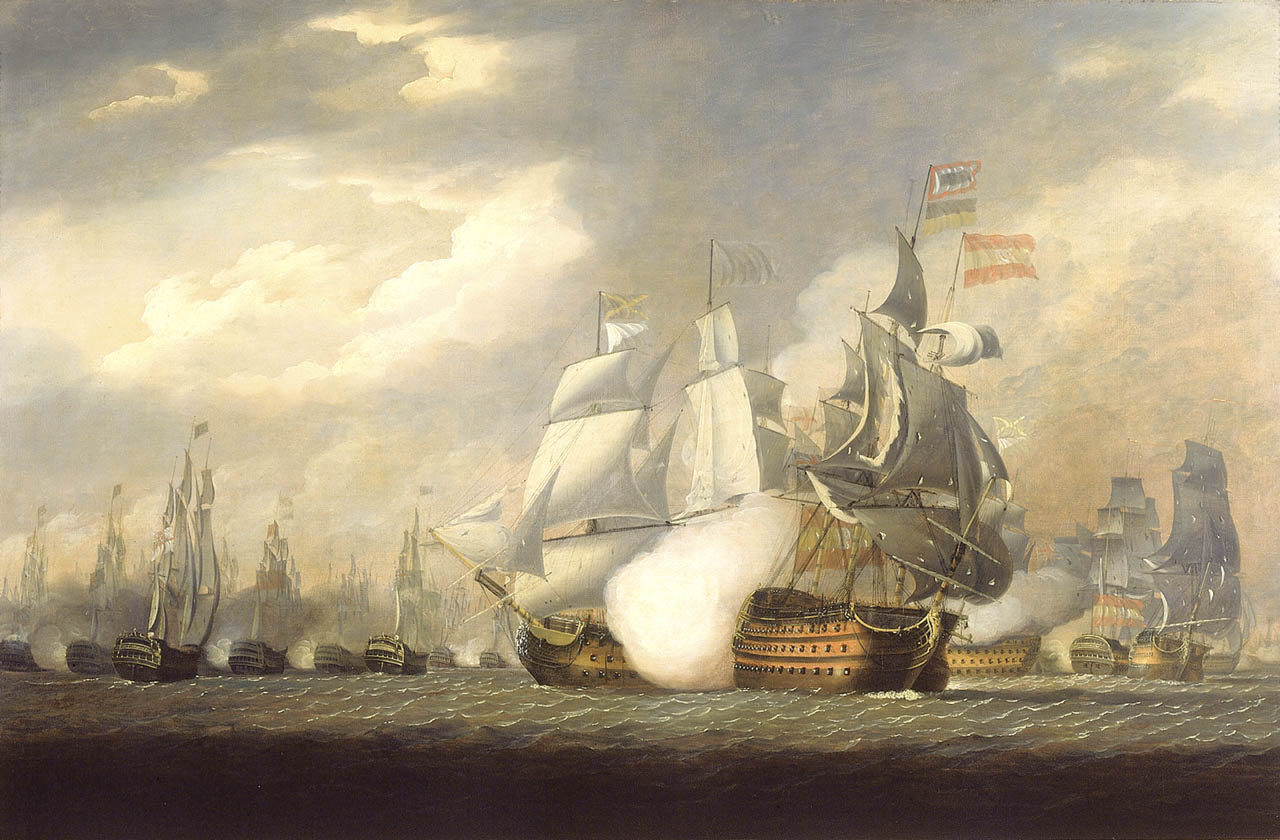
Salvador del Mundo receiving raking fire from HMS Victory by Robert Cleveley

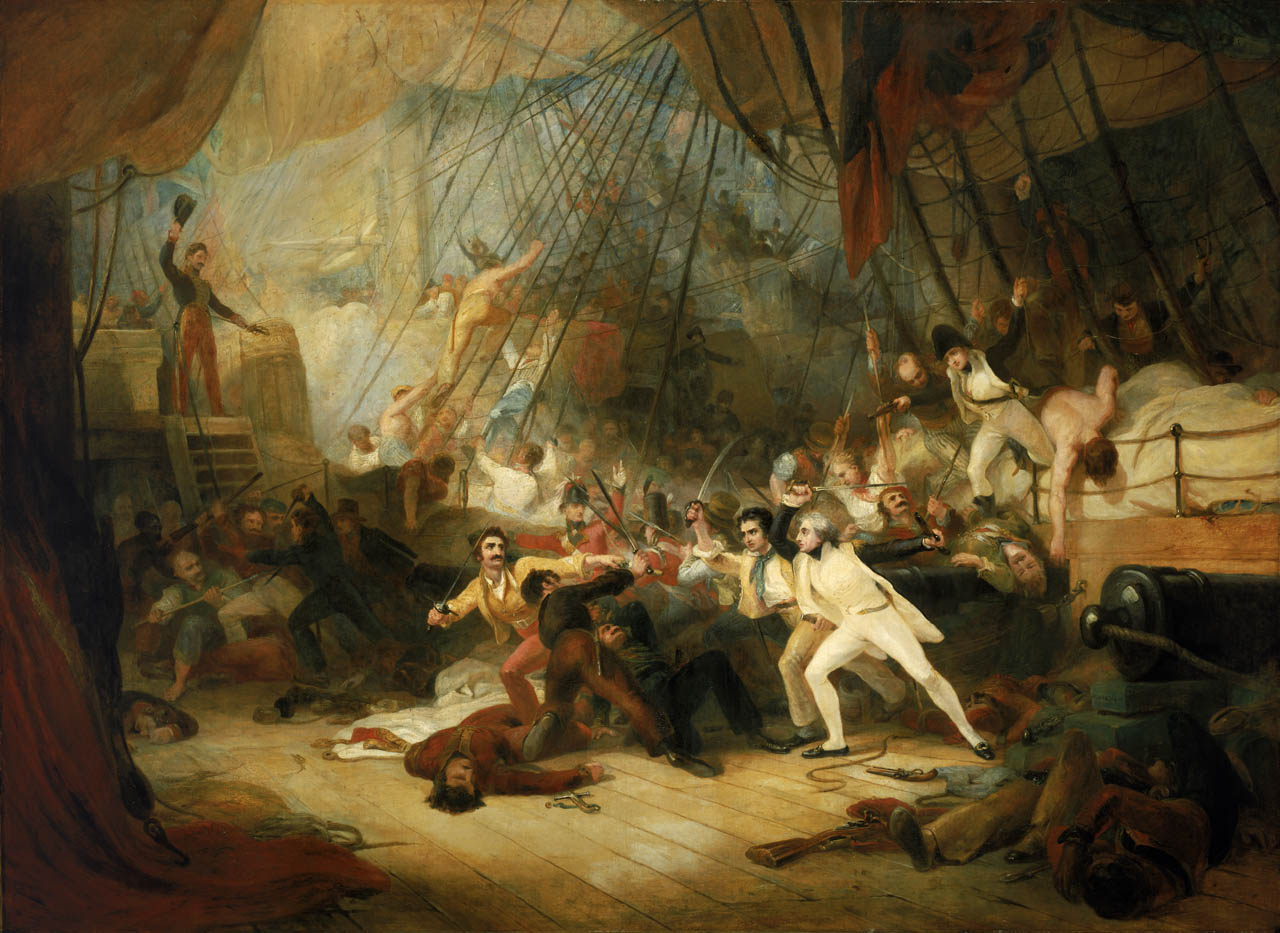
Nelson Boarding the San Josef by George Jones, 1829

HMS Captain capturing the 'San Nicolas' and the 'San Josef' at the Battle of Cape St Vincent (Nicholas Pocock, 1801)

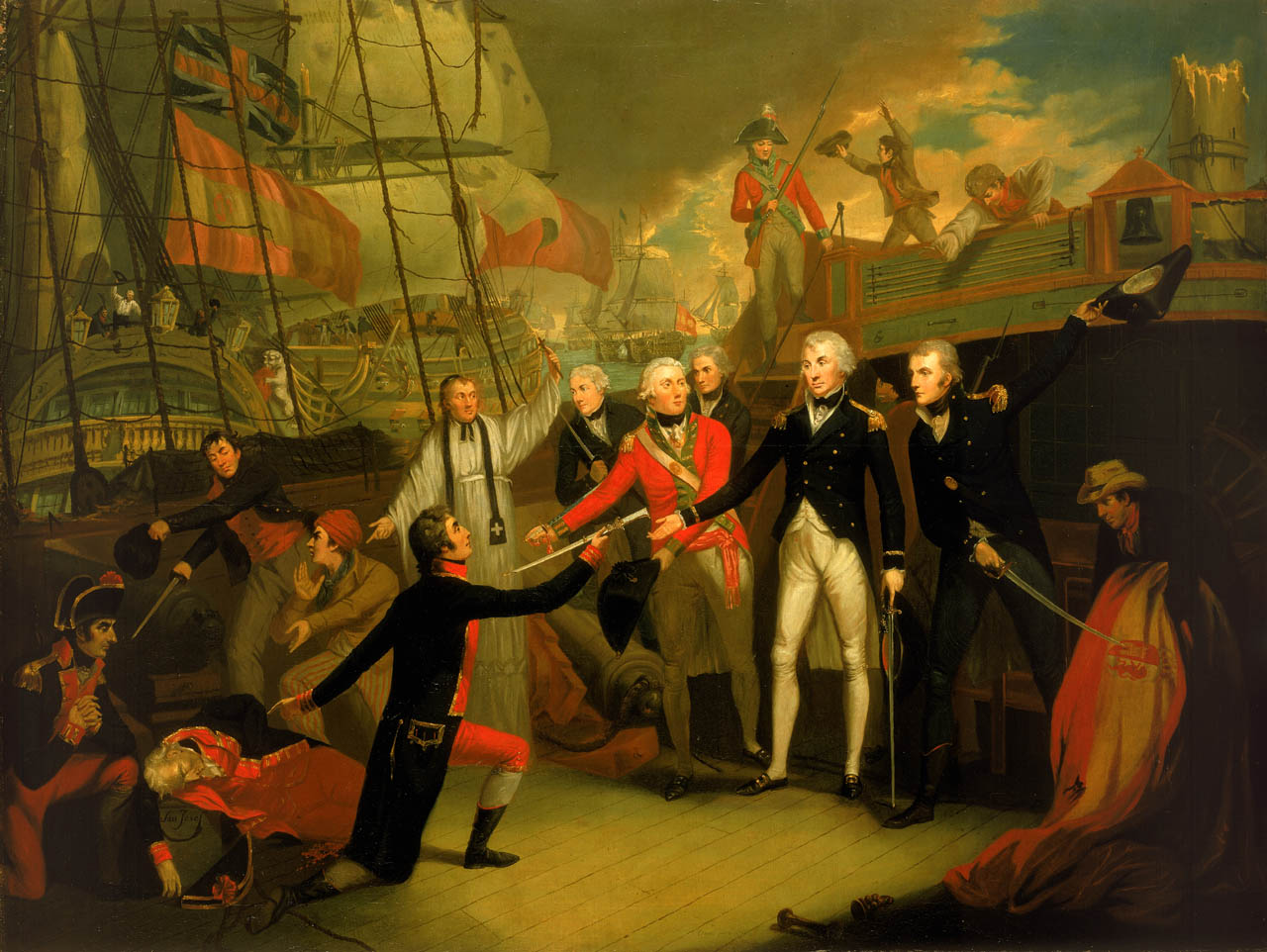
Nelson receiving the surrender of the San José by Daniel Orme, painted 1799

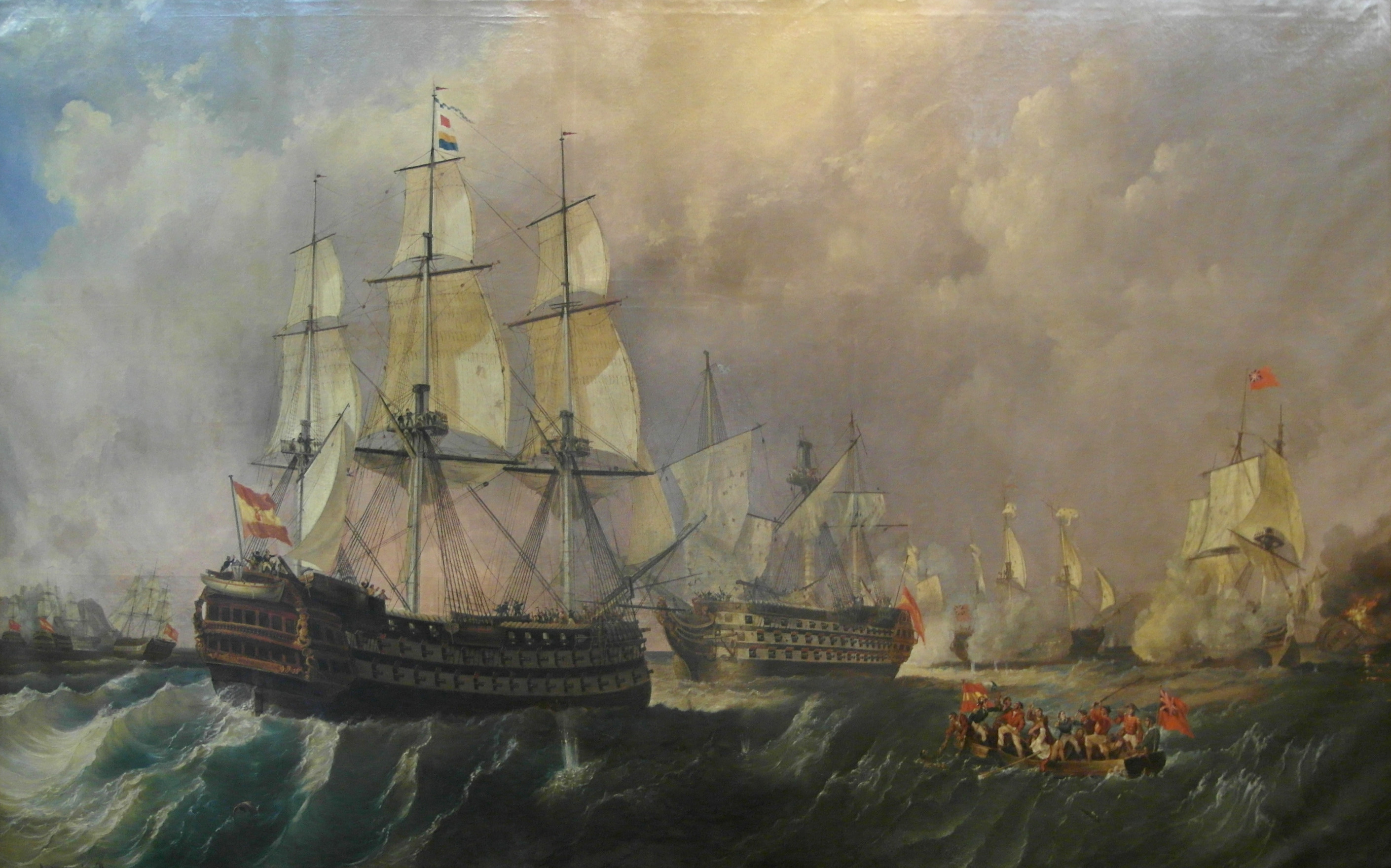
Infante Don Pelayo attempts to rescue the Santísima Trinidad by Antonio Brugada

== Aftermath ==
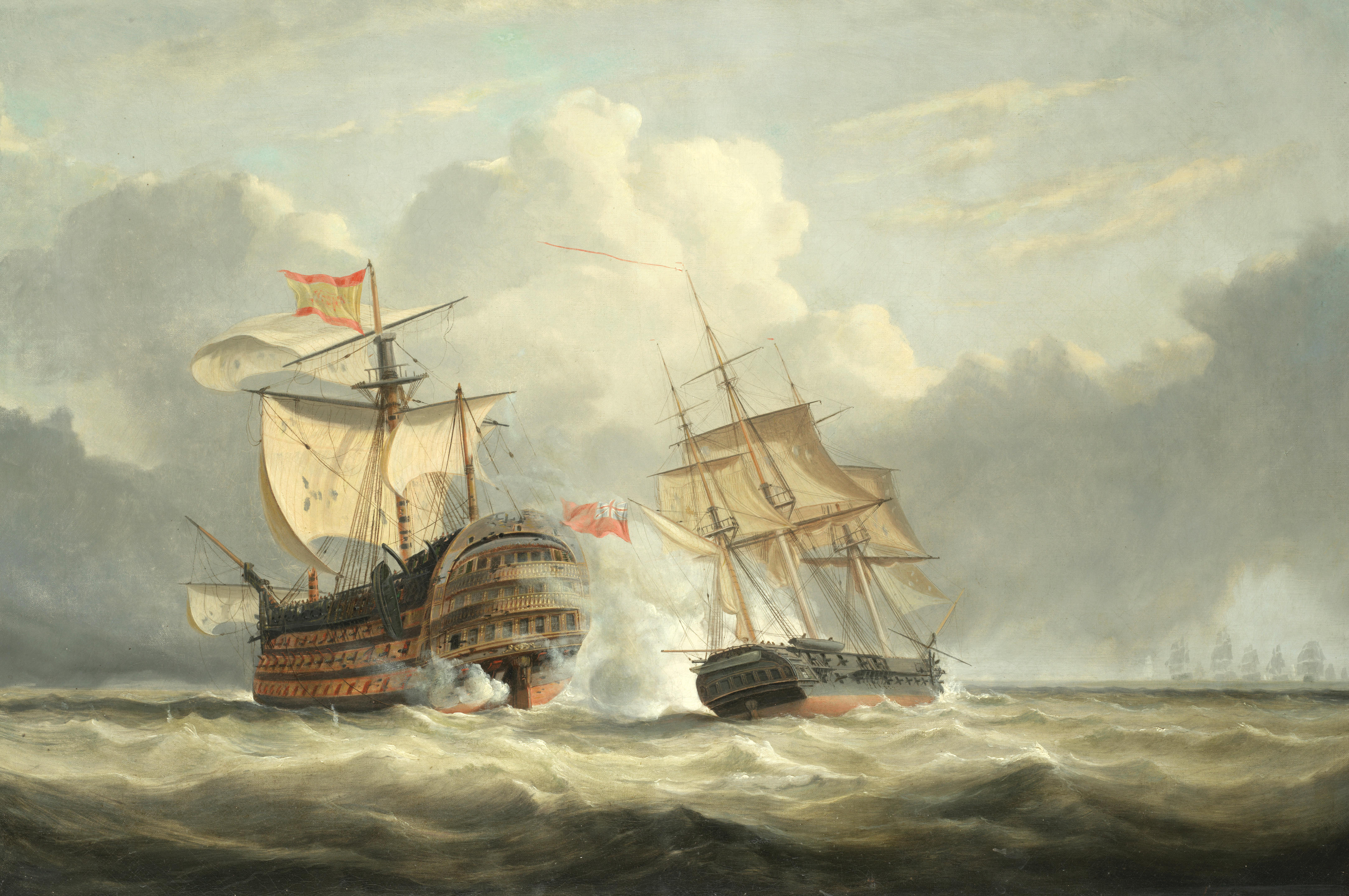
HMS Terpsichore attacking the Santissima Trinidad after the battle

Jervis had given orders to destroy the four prizes had the action restarted. Several days later, the frigate HMS Terpsichore (32) spotted the damaged Santísima Trinidad making her way back to Spain. The captain, Orozco, now commissioned by de Cordoba, had flown his flag in frigate Diana. Terpsichore engaged but kept dodging out of range from the Santísima Trinidad's stern guns. Terpsichore nonetheless was hit twice in a sudden move, resulting in damage in her rigging, masts and sails as well as some impacts on her hull. Captain Richard Bowen then ordered to keep the pursuit from a longer distance, but the frigate vanished away.

While the British fleet lay at Lagos Bay in Portugal, approximately 3,000 Spanish prisoners from the four prizes were landed. Jervis resumed his blockade of the Spanish fleet in Cadiz. The continuation of the blockade for most of the following three years largely curtailed the Spanish fleet until the Peace of Amiens in 1802. The containment of the Spanish threat and the further reinforcement of his fleet enabled Jervis to send a squadron under Nelson back into the Mediterranean the following year. That squadron, including Saumarez's Orion, Troubridge's Culloden, and Goliath, now under Foley, re-established British command of the Mediterranean at the Battle of the Nile.

Jervis was made Baron Jervis and Earl St. Vincent, and granted a lifetime pension of £3,000 per annum. Nelson was knighted as a member of the Order of the Bath. Nelson's promotion to Rear-Admiral was not a reward for his services, but simply a happy coincidence: promotion to flag rank in the Navy of the time was based on seniority on the Captain's list and not on achievement. The City of London presented Jervis, now Earl St. Vincent, with the Freedom of the City in a gold box valued at 100 guineas, and awarded both him and Nelson a ceremonial sword. The presentation box and sword are both currently held at the National Maritime Museum, Greenwich. The swords awarded Jervis and Nelson were the first of their kind to be issued by the City of London. St. Vincent was awarded the thanks of both Houses of Parliament and given a gold medal by the King. The London Gazette published an advertisement in 1798 regarding the prize money due to the commander, officers, and men in the battle, a sum of £140,000.

In a March issue of The Evening Mail, an article entitled "Nelson's New Art of Cookery" featured a purported recipe from Nelson for the Spanish stew olla podrida:

Commodore Nelson's Receipt to make an Olla Podrida. Take a Spanish first-rate, and an 80-gun ship, and after well battering and basting them for an hour, keep throwing in your force balls, and be sure to let them be well seasoned. Your fire must never slacken for a single moment, but must be kept up as brisk as possible during the whole time. So soon, as you perceive your Spaniards to be well stewed and blended together, you must then throw your own ship on board of the two-decker. Lash your sprit sail yard to her mizzen-mast; then jump into her quarter's gallery, sword in hand, and let the rest of your boarders follow as they can. The moment you appear on the 80 gun ship's quarter deck, the Spaniards will all throw down their arms and fly; you will then have only to take a hop, step, and a jump, from your stepping-stone, and you will find yourself in the middle of the first-rate's quarter deck, with all the Spaniards at your feet. Your Olla Podrida may now be considered as completely dished, and fit to be set before his MAJESTY.

Though the Spanish navy was defeated, it was not a decisive defeat, such as the Royal Navy would inflict on the French in the Battle of the Nile two years later. Looking to reform for future engagements against the British, de Cordóba was blamed for the loss, dismissed from the Spanish Navy and forbidden from appearing at court. In 1847, the Admiralty authorized the issuance of the Naval General Service Medal with clasp "St. Vincent" to all surviving claimants from the battle.

== Order of battle ==
=== British fleet ===
Admiral of the Blue Sir John Jervis's Fleet
Ship	Rate	Guns	Commander	Casualties			Notes
Ship	Rate	Guns	Commander	Killed	Wounded	Total	Notes
Culloden	Third rate	74	Captain Thomas Troubridge	10	47	57	
Blenheim	Second rate	90	Captain Thomas L. Frederick	12	49	61	
Prince George	Second rate	98	Rear-Admiral William Parker; Captain John Irwin	8	7	15	
Orion	Third rate	74	Captain James Saumarez	0	9	9	
Colossus	Third rate	74	Captain George Murray	0	5	5	
Irresistible	Third rate	74	Captain George Martin	5	14	19	
Victory	First rate	100	Admiral Sir John Jervis; Captain Robert Calder (captain of the fleet); Captain George Grey (flag captain)	1	5	6	
Egmont	Third rate	74	Captain John Sutton	0	0	0	
Goliath	Third rate	74	Captain Charles Henry Knowles	0	8	8	
Barfleur	Second rate	98	Vice-Admiral William Waldegrave; Captain James Richard Dacres	0	7	7	
Britannia	First rate	100	Vice-Admiral Charles Thompson; Captain Thomas Foley	0	1	1	
Namur	Second rate	90	Captain James Hawkins Whitshed	2	5	7	
Captain	Third rate	74	Commodore Horatio Nelson; Captain Ralph Willett Miller	24	56	80	Nelson was wounded during the action.
Diadem	Third rate	64	Captain George Henry Towry	0	2	2	
Excellent	Third rate	74	Captain Cuthbert Collingwood	11	12	23	
Total recorded casualties: 73 killed, 227 wounded

==== Other British vessels ====
Ship	Guns	Commander	Rate
Minerve	38	Captain George Cockburn	Fifth-rate frigate
Lively	32	Captain Lord Garlies	Fifth-rate frigate
Niger	32	Captain Edward James Foote	Fifth-rate frigate
Southampton	32	Captain James Macnamara	Fifth-rate frigate
Bonne Citoyenne	20	Commander Charles Lindsay	Unrated Sloop-of-war
Raven	18	Commander William Prowse	Unrated brig-sloop
Fox	10	Lieutenant John Gibson	Unrated cutter

=== Spanish fleet ===
Fleet Commander – Lieutenant-general José de Córdoba y Ramos
2nd Squadron / Vanguard – Lieutenant-general Francisco Javier Morales de los Ríos
1st Division (Note: The 1st Division originally included the 80-gun Neptuno (under Brigadier José Lorenzo de Goicoechea), 74-gun Bahama (under Squadron commander Domingo de Nava y Porlier and Captain José Aramburu) and 34-guns Santa Brigida (under Frigate Captain José González Ortiz) and Santa Casilda (under Frigate Captain Marcos Fonguion), which had been sent with the 74-gun Terrible and 34-gun Santa Dorotea to escort into Algéciras 28 gunboats intended to supplement the bombardment of Gibraltar. Terrible and Santa Dorotea then rejoined Córdoba's fleet, but the other two ships of the line and two frigates remained in Algéciras.)
Ship	Type (Note: The Spanish navy had no equivalent to the rating system of the Royal Navy.)	Guns	Commander (Note: The British equivalents to the Spanish ranks, are, in order: Vice admiral (equivalent to Lieutenant general), Rear admiral (equivalent to Squadron commander), Commodore (equivalent to Brigadier) and Captain (equivalent to Ship-of-the-line Captain and Frigate Captain). Where two names are included under "Commander", the first is the flag officer for the division and the second is the ship's own captain.)	Casualties				Notes
Ship	Type	Guns	Commander	Killed	Seriously Wounded	Slightly Wounded	Total	Notes
Infante don Pelayo	Ship of the line	74	Ship-of-the-line Captain Cayetano Valdés y Flores	4	4	0	8	
San Pablo	Ship of the line	74	Ship-of-the-line Captain Baltasar Hidalgo de Cisneros	-	-	-	-	
2nd Division
Purísima Concepción	Ship of the line	112	Lieutenant-general Francisco Javier Morales de los Ríos; Brigadier José Escaño	8	21	0	29	
Perla	Frigate	34	Frigate Captain Francisco Moyúa	-	-	-	-	
Santo Domingo	Ship of the line	64	Ship-of-the-line Captain Manuel María de Torres Valdivia	2	0	0	2	
Conquistador	Ship of the line	74	Ship-of-the-line Captain José Butler	6	0	0	6	
San Juan Nepomuceno	Ship of the line	74	Ship-of-the-line Captain Antonio Boneo	-	-	-	-	
Nuestra Señora de las Mercedes	Frigate	34	Frigate Captain José Vasco	-	-	-	-	
San Genaro	Ship of the line	74	Ship-of-the-line Captain Agustín Villavicencio	-	-	-	-	
1st Squadron / Battle Line – Lieutenant-general José de Córdoba y Ramos
3rd Division
Mexicano	Ship of the line	112	Squadron commander Pedro de Cárdenas; Brigadier Francisco de Herrera y Crusat (†)	25	46	42	113	
Nuestra Señora de la Paz	Frigate	40	Commander Santiago Irizarri	-	-	-	-	
Oriente	Ship of the line	74	Ship-of-the-line Captain Juan Suárez de Barros	8	20	0	100	
Soberano	Ship of the line	74	Brigadier Juan Vicente Yáñez; Ship-of-the-line Captain Francisco Ley (†)	25	46	33	104	
Terrible	Ship of the line	74	Ship-of-the-line Captain Francisco Javier Uriarte					
Santa Dorotea	Frigate	34	Frigate Captain Manuel Guerrero y Serón	-	-	-	-	
4th Division
Nuestra Señora de la Santísima Trinidad	Ship of the line	130	Lieutenant-general José de Córdoba y Ramos; Brigadier Rafael Orozco; Major-general Ciriaco Ceballos	69	141	92	302	badly damaged
Vigilante	Brig	12	Lieutenant José de Córdoba y Rojas	-	-	-	-	
San Nicolás de Bari	Ship of the line	80	Brigadier Tomás Geraldino (†)	144	59	-	203	captured
San Isidro	Ship of the line	74	Ship-of-the-line Captain Teodoro Argumosa de Cisneros	29	63	-	92	captured
Salvador del Mundo	Ship of the line	112	Brigadier Antonio Yepes (†)	42	124	-	166	captured
San Ildefonso	Ship of the line	74	Ship-of-the-line Captain Rafael Maestre y Thous	-	-	-	-	
Nuestra Señora de Guadalupe	Frigate	34	Frigate Captain Juan Morales	-	-	-	-	
Santa Teresa	Frigate	34		-	-	-	-	
3rd Squadron / Rearguard – Lieutenant-general Juan Joaquín Moreno de Mondragón
5th Division
Conde de Regla	Ship of the line	112	Brigadier Claude-François Renart d'Amblimont (†); Brigadier Jerónimo Bravo	9	17	27	53	
Santa Matilde	Frigate	34	Frigate Captain Manuel Vitoria de Lerea y Vélez	-	-	-	-	
San Fermín	Ship of the line	74	Ship-of-the-line Captain José María de Torres del Campo	-	-	-	-	
Firme	Ship of the line	74	Ship-of-the-line Captain Bruno Ayala	2	1	0	3	
Principe de Asturias	Ship of the line	112	Lieutenant-general Juan Joaquín Moreno de Mondragón; Brigadier Antonio de Escaño	10	19	0	29	
Diana	Frigate	34	Frigate Captain Juan José Varela	-	-	-	-	
6th Division
San Antonio	Ship of the line	74	Ship-of-the-line Captain Salvador Medina	-	-	-	-	
Glorioso	Ship of the line	74	Ship-of-the-line Captain Juan de Aguirre	-	-	-	-	
Nuestra Señora de Atocha	Frigate	40	Frigate Captain José Antonio Pareja	-	-	-	-	
Atlante	Ship of the line	74	Ship-of-the-line Captain Gonzálo Vallejo	6	4	1	11	
San Francisco de Paula	Ship of the line	74	Ship-of-the-line Captain José Ussel de Guimbarda	-	-	-	-	
San José	Ship of the line	112	Squadron commander Francisco Javier Winthuysen y Pineda (†); Brigadier Pedro Pineda	46	96	-	142	captured
Ceres	Frigate	40	Frigate Captain Ignacio Olaeta	-	-	-	-	
Asunción	Merchantman	28	Lieutenant Manuel Díaz Herrera	-	-	-	-	
Santa Justa	Merchantman	18	Lieutenant Florencio Scals	-	-	-	-	
Santa Balbina	Merchantman	18	Lieutenant Diego Ochandía	-	-	-	-	
Santa Paula	Merchantman	20	Lieutenant José Elexaga	-	-	-	-	
Total recorded casualties: 430 killed, 661 seriously wounded and 195 slightly wounded
