= HMS Raven (1796) =

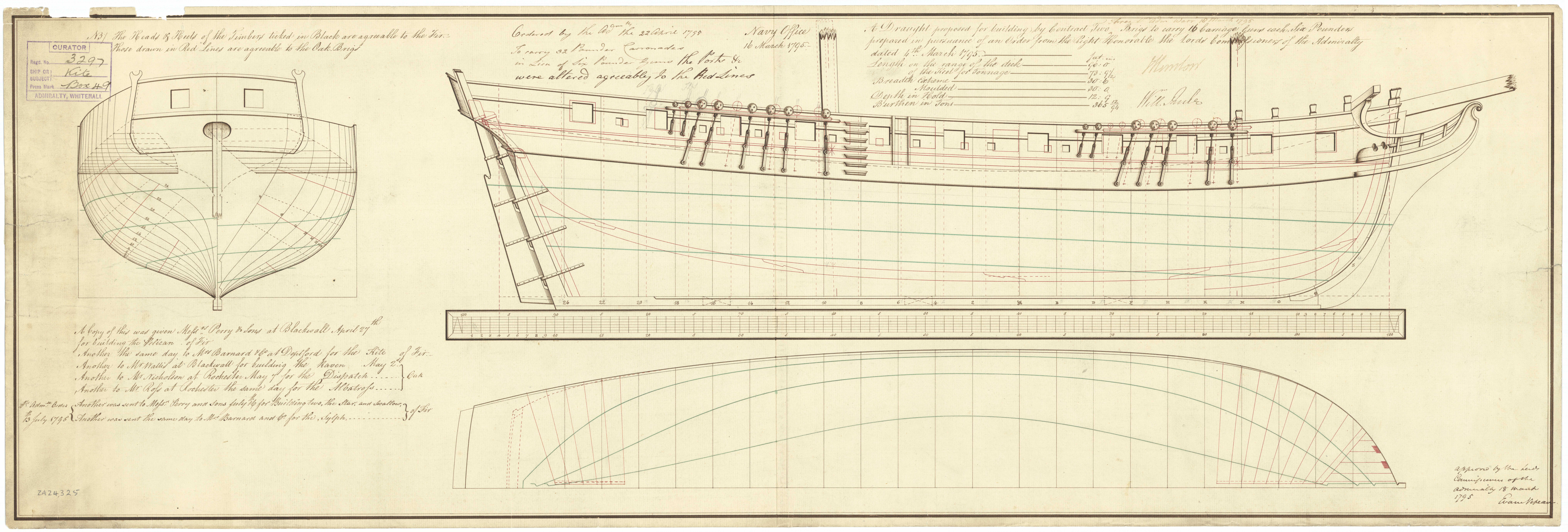
- Drawing showing the body plan with stern board outline, sheer lines with scroll figurehead, and longitudinal half-breadth used to build Albatross and the other ships of her class

History

Great Britain
- Name: HMS Raven
- Ordered: 18 March 1795
- Builder: william Wallis, Blackwall
- Laid down: May 1795
- Launched: 11 January 1796
- Honours and awards: Naval General Service Medal with clasp "St Vincent"
- Fate: Wrecked 3 February 1798

General characteristics
- Class & type: Albatross-class brig-sloop
- Tons burthen: 36948/94 (bm)
- Length: Overall: 96 ft 0 in (29.3 m); Keel: 73 ft 8 in (22.5 m)
- Beam: 30 ft 8 1/2 in (9.4 m)
- Depth of hold: 12 ft 9 in (3.9 m)
- Complement: 121
- Armament: 16 × 32-pounder carronades + 2 × 6-pounder bow chasers
- Notes: Fir-built

HMS Raven was launched in 1796. She performed a supporting role at a notable battle in 1797. She was wrecked in 1798.

== Career ==
Lieutenant John Giffard was promoted to Commander in Raven and commissioned her in February 1796.

On 11 August he sailed from Spithead, as part of the escort of a large convoy under the orders of Admiral Sir Hyde Parker. The convoy was approaching Cadiz when Admiral Parker found out that French Admiral Joseph de Richery had left Cadiz. Parker instructed Giffard to escort the convoy to Lisbon while Parker proceeded with his squadron to the West Indies. (Note: Richery sailed under cover of a Spanish fleet, separating once at sea and sailing across the Atlantic to the valuable fishing grounds off Newfoundland and Maritime Canada. In a series of devastating raids on undefended fishing communities and shipping, Richery destroyed or captured more than a hundred British ships. Richery returned to France in November.) Vice-Admiral George Vandeput, commanding on the coast of Portugal, conveyed the thanks of the Board of Admiralty to Captain Giffard.

Raven next carried to Admiral Sir John Jervis the intelligence that the Spanish fleet had, near Gibraltar, chased British squadron under Rear-Admiral Admiral Robert Mann. Admiral Jervis promoted Giffard on 19 October 1796 to post captain.

On 2 January 1797, Raven was part of a squadron under Lord Viscount Garlies, off Cadiz. HMS Meleager, Niger, Lively, Fortune, and Raven were in company at the capture of the Spanish vessel Nostra Senora de la Misericordia. That same day the same vessels captured the French privateer Foudroyant, for which head money was paid in August 1801. Also in early 1797, these British vessels and some others captured the Spanish ship San Francisco, which was sold in Lisbon.

Lieutenant William Prowse was promoted to Commander in Raven, which on 14 February was one of the repeaters to the British fleet in the battle of Cape St. Vincent (1797). In 1847 the Admiralty awarded the Naval General Service Medal to any surviving crew members that claimed it.

Commander Peter Puget replaced Prowse in April. Earlier, Jervis had put Puget in charge of San Nicolas, a Spanish ship-of-the-line captured in the battle, still crewed by Spaniards; Puget suppressed a mutiny and delivered the crew to Lisbon.

In August, Commander Bartholomew James replaced Puget, only to be replaced in October by Commander John Dixon. (Note: In December, Commander James moved to HMS Corso.)

== Loss ==
Raven sailed from Great Yarmouth on 27 January 1798, for the North Sea. Three days later, she endured a three-day storm that damaged her spars and rigging. Dixon decided to enter the Elbe to effect repairs. The North Sea pilot approached the river, but became confused. Dixon anchored and took on a local Danish pilot. Under that pilot's guidance Raven entered the river, making for Cuxhaven, but on 3 February she grounded on the middle ground sand. She quickly started filling with water. Local fishermen took off the crew before she fell on her side at low tide. The subsequent court-martial of Dixon and his crew blamed the loss on the local pilot's ignorance. (Note: One of the crew was 12-year old Thomas Cooke. Earlier, he had been on Raven at the battle of Cape St Vincent. He later, during the Peace of Amiens in 1802, left the Navy and went on to become an actor.)
