= Spanish ship Monarca (1794) =

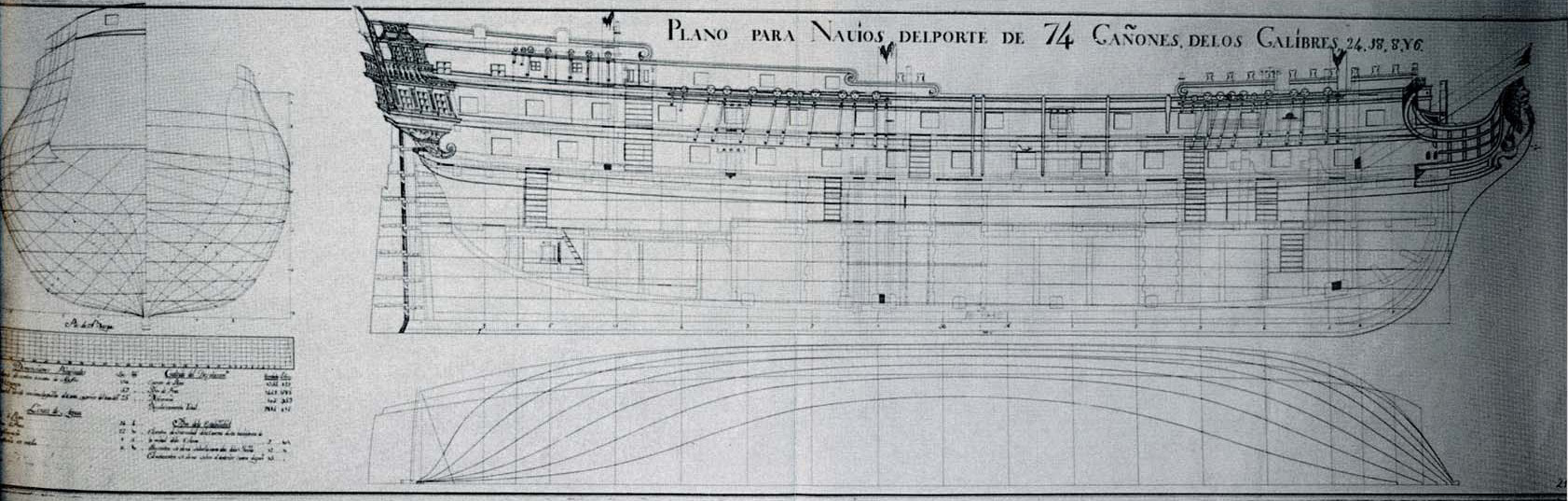
Plans for a ship of the San Ildefonsino class

Monarca was a 74-gun third-rate ship of the line of the Spanish Navy. She was ordered by a royal order of 28 September 1791, built in the Reales Astilleros de Esteiro shipyard and launched on 17 March 1794. Designed by José Romero Fernández de Landa and belonging to the San Ildefonso class, her main guns were distributed along two complete decks, with twenty-eight 24-pounders in her first battery (lower deck) and thirty 18-pounders in her second battery (upper deck). Additionally on completion she had ten 8-pounders on her quarterdeck and six 8-pounders on her forecastle, although these guns were altered during her life.

== History ==
She underwent proving trials between September and November 1794 alongside the Montañés, also launched in 1794 but designed by Julián Martín de Retamosa (Romero de Landa's successor), aiming to work out whose method of construction was best. The trials were overseen by José Justo Salceno and the results favoured the Montañés. The Monarca was assigned to Juan de Lángara's squadron, taking part in the defence of Roses.

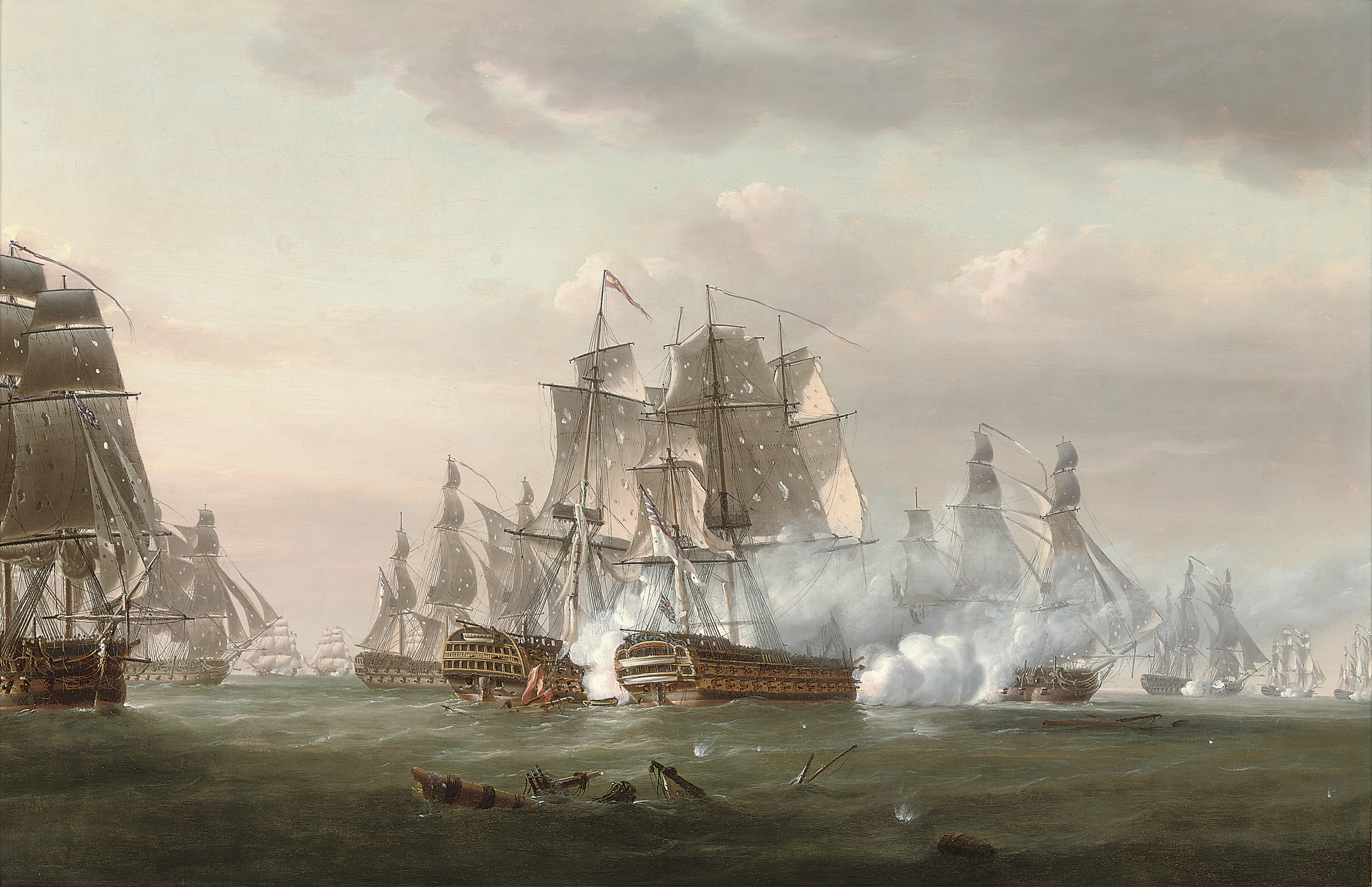
In action at Trafalgar, HMS Tonnant engaging the Spanish 74-gun Monarca

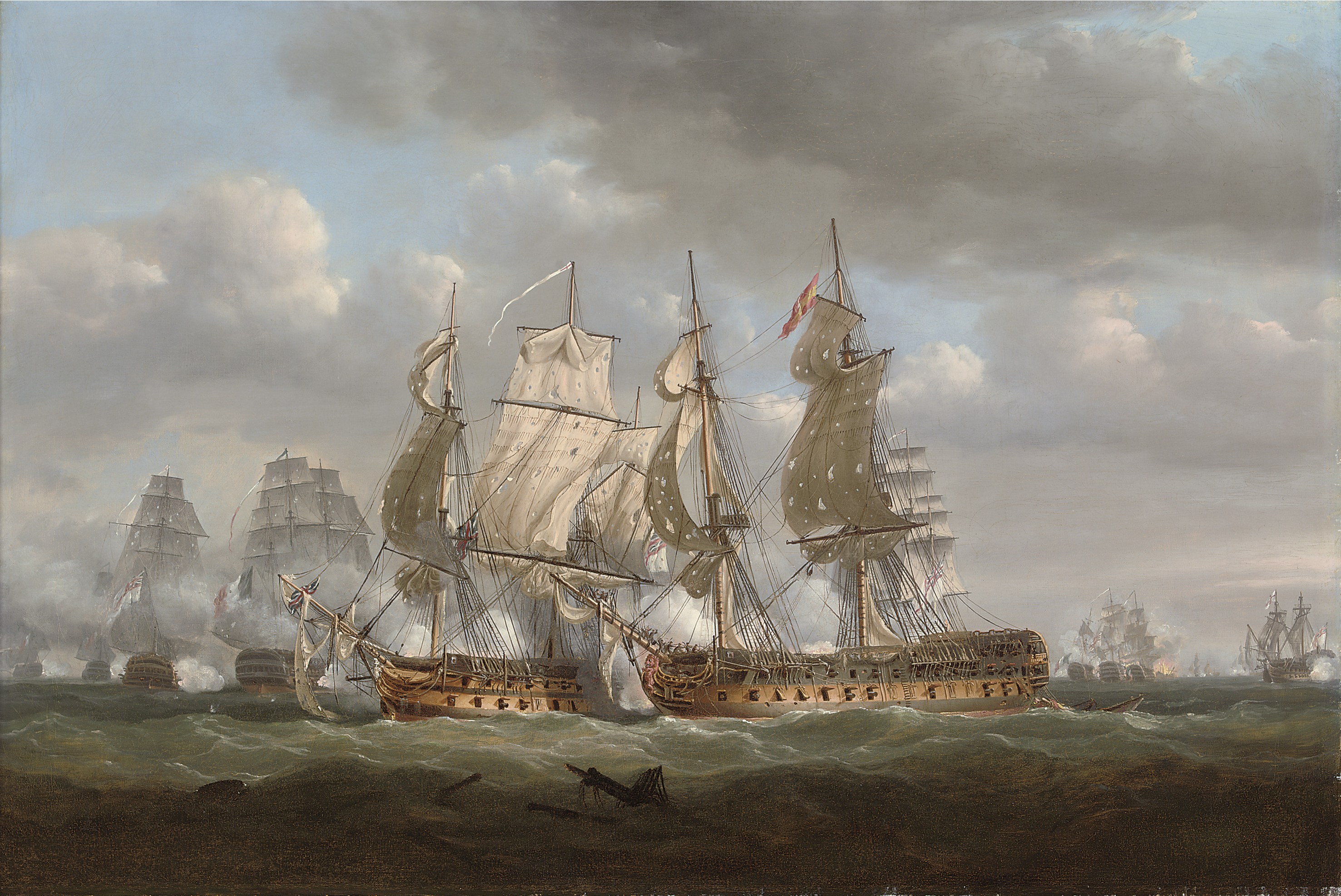
Tonnant accepting Monarca's surrender, painted by Nicholas Pocock

She took part in the battle of Trafalgar on 21 October 1805 under the command of Captain Teodoro Argumosa y Bourke. She was attacked at close range by HMS Mars and Tonnant as they first cut the Franco-Spanish line. The ship behind the Tonnant, Bellerophon, slipped under her stern at 12:30 and fired two broadsides into her. She was heavily damaged, with 100 men killed and 150 wounded. A party of 55 Royal Marines captured the ship, but the night after the battle the surviving Spanish crew overpowered them and cast them adrift, leaving them to the mercy of the storm that night.

On 24 October the survivors decided to try to repair the ship's rudder and return to Cádiz, as the weather was improving, but an hour later they were pursued by Leviathan, which also picked up the marines and some Spanish survivors of the storm. On 28 October the ship ran aground on the Arenas Gordas coast near Huelva, between Torre de la Higuera and Torre del Asperillo. On 31 October she was set on fire by the crew of the frigate Phoebe and blown up by order of Vice-Admiral Cuthbert Collingwood.

== See also ==
- Spanish ship Monarca (1756)

== Bibliography ==
- Adkin, Mark (2005). The Trafalgar Companion: A Guide to History's Most Famous Sea Battle and the Life of Admiral Lord Nelson. Aurum. ISBN 1-84513-018-9.
- Adkins, Roy (2004). Trafalgar: The Biography of a Battle. Little, Brown. ISBN 0-316-72511-0.
- Clayton, Tim & Craig, Phil (2004). Trafalgar: The Men, the Battle, the Storm. Hodder & Stoughton. ISBN 0-340-83026-3.
- Fremont-Barnes, Gregory (2005). Trafalgar 1805: Nelson's Crowning Victory. Campaign. Vol. 157. Osprey Publishing. ISBN 1-84176-892-8.
- Goodwin, Peter (2005). The Ships of Trafalgar: The British, French and Spanish Fleets October 1805. Naval Institute Press. ISBN 1-59114-824-3.
- Arturo Pérez-Reverte, Cabo Trafalgar, Alfaguara, 2004.
- Winfield, Rif; Tredrea, John M; García-Torralba Pérez, Enrique & Blasco Felip, Manuel (2023). Spanish Warships in the Age of Sail 1700—1860: Design, Construction, Careers and Fates. Barnsley, UK: Seaforth Publishing. ISBN 978-1-5267-9078-1.
