= Spanish ship Diana =

Various Spanish Navy ships

At least five ships of the Spanish Navy have borne the name Diana, after Diana, goddess of the countryside and nature, hunters, wildlife, childbirth, crossroads, the night, and the Moon in Roman mythology:

- Diana, a 34-gun frigate launched in 1792 and scrapped in 1833.
- Diana, a corvette in commission from 1801 to 1832.
- Diana, a screw corvette constructed in 1867, hulked in 1888, and stricken in 1897.
- Diana (F-63), an Atrevida-class corvette in commission from 1960 to 1973.
- Diana (F-32), an Descubierta-class corvette commissioned in 1979, converted into a mine countermeasures ship in 2000, decommissioned in 2015, sold in 2016, and scrapped in 2017.
