= Francisco Javier Winthuysen y Pineda =

Spanish Navy officer (c. 1747 - 1797)

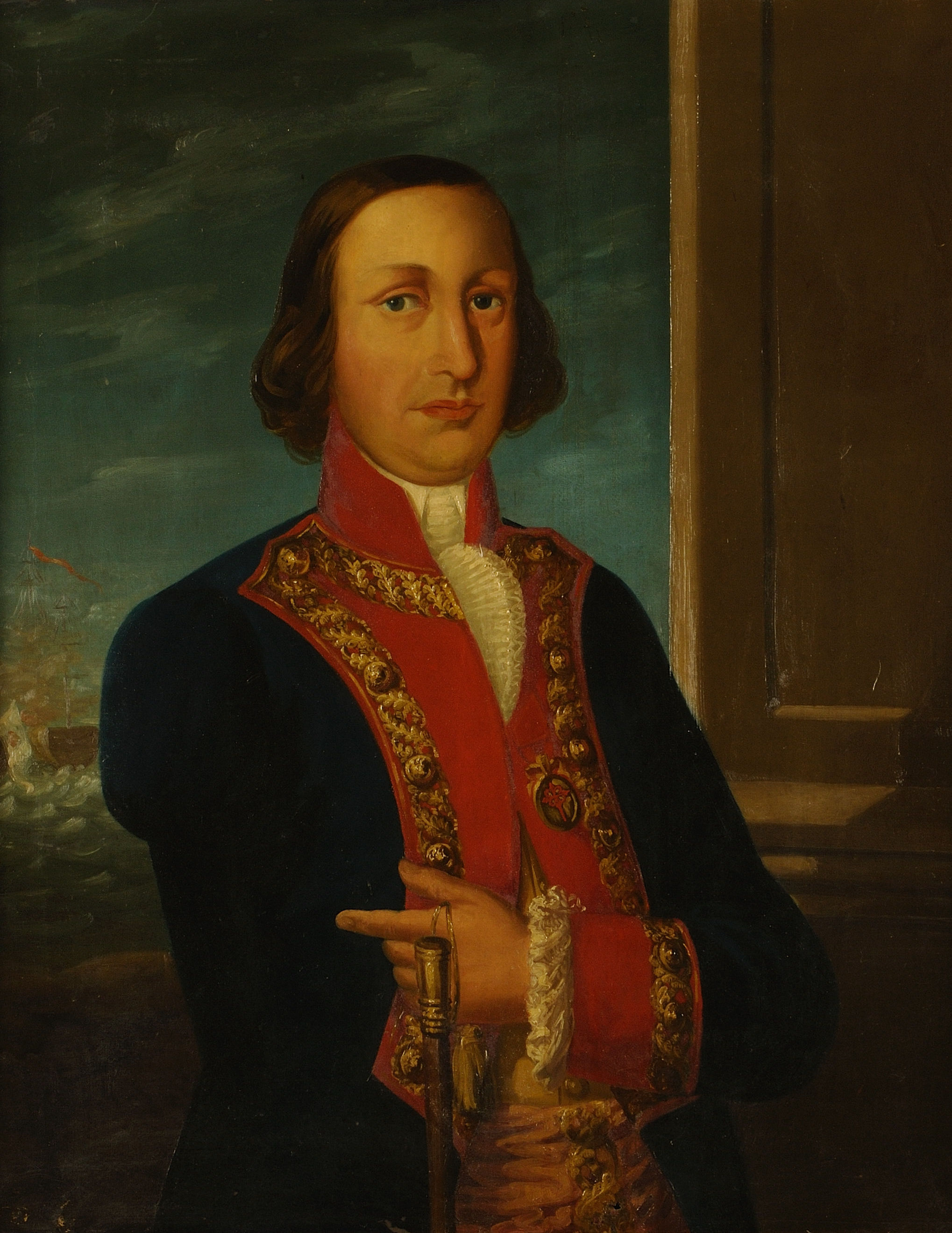
A portrait of Winthuysen currently owned by the Naval Museum of Madrid

Squadron Commander Francisco Javier Winthuysen y Pineda (c. 1747 – 14 February 1797) was a Spanish Navy officer.

== Life ==
During the Anglo-Spanish War, part of the American Revolutionary War, Winthuysen fought against Britain off the coast of Galicia and off the American coast, where he lost an arm. He fought at the Great Siege of Gibraltar and was killed in action on the San José at the Battle of Cape St. Vincent, serving as a squadron commander.
