= Reales Astilleros de Esteiro =

Naval dockyard

The Real Astillero de Esteiro (in English: Esteiro Royal Dockyards) was a royal shipyard in Ferrol in Spain. Orders for its construction were issued by Ferdinand VI of Spain on 9 April 1749, following the decision by the naval minister Zenón de Somodevilla, 1st Marqués de la Ensenada, to build new naval fortifications and installations in Ferrol and its surrounding area. Initial construction was managed by Cosme Álvarez, Comandante General of the Department. It was sited on the northwest slope of the monte Esteiro near Ferrol. It was initially planned to have four levels, but by the end this rose to twelve, proportional to the mountain's slope. Barracks, workshops and warehouses were also built.

== Ships built at Esteiro ==
=== 'Apostles' ===
At its height, through an order by the Marquis de la Ensenada dated 15 July 1752, the shipyard simultaneously built twelve 68-gun ships of the line simultaneously, popularly known as the "Twelve Apostles" or "Apostolate" class. The survivors of this group were each subsequently raised to 74 guns. This project greatly increased the arsenal's industrial activity, boosting the local civilian economy and increasing the town's population by drawing in the skilled workers needed. The twelve ships (with their years of launching) were:

- Oriente, also known as San Diego de Alcalá (launched 1753)
- Éolo or San Juan de Dios (1753)
- Neptuno or San Justo (1754)
- Magnánimo or San Justo y San Pastor (1754)
- Aquilón or San Dámaso (1754)
- Gallardo or San Juan de Sahagún (1754)
- Brillante or San Dionisio (1754)
- Vencedor or San Julián (1755)
- Glorioso or San Francisco Javier (1755)
- Guerrero or San Raimundo (1755)
- Héctor or San Bernardo (1755)
- Soberano or San Gregorio (1755).

=== Other warships with number of guns (and year launched) ===
- San Fernando - 64 (1751)
- Castilla - 64 (1751)
- Asia - 62 (1752)
- Galga - 30-gun frigate (1752)
- San Miguel - 14-gun snow (1752)
- Triunfante - 68 (1756)
- Dichoso - 68 (1756)
- Monarca - 68 (1756)
- Diligente - 68 (1756)
- San Fernando - 14-gun snow (1757)
- Campeon - 60 (1758)
- San Isidro - 74 (1768)
- San Julian - 74 (1768)
- Santa Ana - 112 (1784)
- Salvador del Mundo - 112 (1787)
- Europa - 74 (1789)
- Reina María Luisa - 112 (1791)
- Monarca - 74 (1791)
- Duque de Tetuán - floating battery (1875)
- Eulalia - gunboat (1882)
- Concha - gunboat (1883)

== Bibliography ==
- Un Episodio de Ferrol de la Ilustración. de Juan J. Burgoa
- Ferrol, Historia urbana.
- Los Aresanos en la construcción del Astillero de Esteiro y el Arsenal de Ferrol.
