= Spanish ship Fama =

Spanish warship

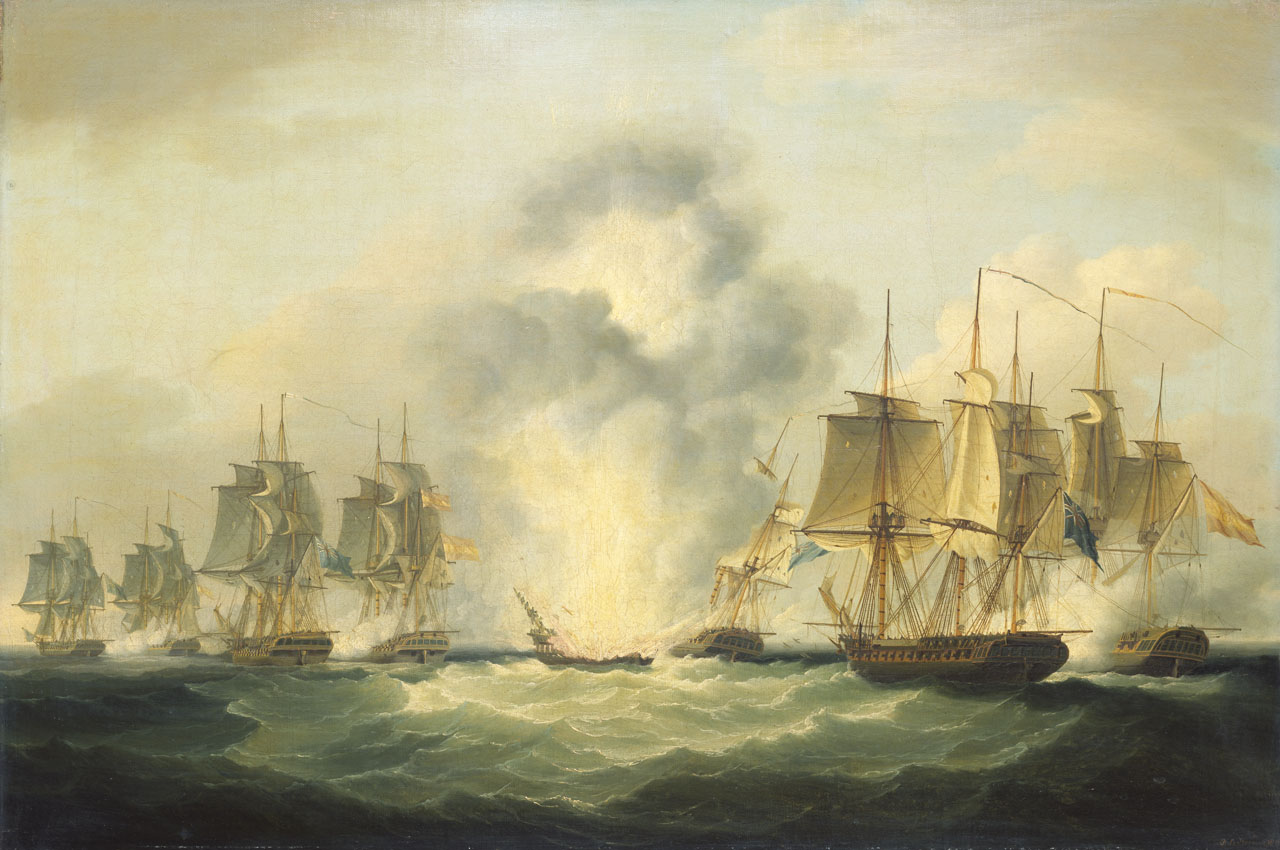
- Painting of the Battle of Cape Santa Maria. Fama can be seen as the second-from-left ship exchanging fire with HMS Medusa on the far left side of the image.

History

Spain
- Name: Fama
- Operator: Spanish navy
- Laid down: 1795
- Launched: 1795
- In service: 1795-1804
- Captured: 5 October 1804

United Kingdom
- Name: HMS Fama
- Acquired: 1804
- In service: 1804-1812
- Fate: Sold in 1812

General characteristics
- Class & type: Fifth-rate frigate
- Type: Frigate
- Tons burthen: 979 tons
- Length: 145 ft
- Beam: 39 ft
- Depth of hold: 12 ft
- Decks: Two
- Propulsion: Sail
- Armament: 34 Cannon

Fama was a fifth-rate frigate in service with the Spanish and British Royal Navies.

== History ==
Fama was laid down as a 34-gun fifth-rate frigate in Cartagena in 1795, and was launched later that year. In 1796 she was assigned to the Spanish Philippines, and so she departed Concepcion, Chile for Manila on 10 October 1796 in the company of the third-rates Europa, Montañes, San Pedro, and the frigate Pilar. In Manila a typhoon severely damaged the squadron, putting it out of action for nearly two years. At the same time, the Anglo-Spanish War broke out between Great Britain and Spain. After repairs were completed, Admiral Ignacio Maria de Álava y Sáenz de Navarrete attempted to use the fleet to disrupt the British trade with China by sailing the squadron into the South China Sea in search of a British convoy. After fighting an inconclusive battle with a British fleet in January 1797, de Navarrete ordered Fama and Europa to Macau in an attempt to intercept British merchantmen in the Pearl River estuary. This operation was likewise a failure, and both ships returned to Manila.

In 1804 Fama and three other Spanish frigates departed Montevideo for Spain laden silver and gold destined for France. Though Britain and Spain were not at war, the Royal Navy intercepted the Spanish force with the intent to stop its valuable cargo from reaching France. In the ensuing Battle of Cape Santa Maria, a force of four British frigates attacked the Spanish frigates. Fama struck her colors in surrender soon after the battle started, but later attempted to flee. She was caught by the faster HMS Medusa and HMS Lively several hours later and forced to surrender a second time.

Following her capture, Fama was inducted into the Royal Navy as HMS Fama. She was sold in 1812.
