= List of ships built at Ferrol shipyards 1750–1881 =

This is a list of ships built in the Reales Astilleros de Esteiro of the naval station of Ferrol, in north-western Spain, between 1750 and 1881. Between 1808 and 1825, coinciding with the emancipation of the Spanish Colonies in America, and the war against the French, the shipyards of Ferrol ceased activity. There was a complete standstill for 17 years and no ships were launched in the most important shipyards of Spain in northern Iberia. In 1842 the Spanish first steamship was launched in the shipyards of Ferrol.

== Wooden ships ==
=== Warships ===
- Fernando (1751)
- Asia (1752)
- Eolo (1753)
- Oriente (1754)
- Aquilon (1754)
- Neptuno (1754)
- Brillante (1754)
- Gallardo (1754)
- Magnanimo (1754)
- Glorioso (1755)
- Guerrero (1755)
- Vencedor (1755)
- Soberano (1755)
- Hector (1755)
- Triunfante (1756)
- Dichoso (1756)
- Monarca (1756)
- Diligente (1756)
- Campéon (1758)
- San Isidro (1768)
- San Julian (1768)
- San Pedro Apostol (1770)
- San Pablo (1771)
- San Gabriel (1772)
- San Eugenio (1775)
- Mino (1779)
- Castilla (1779)
- Purísima Concepcion (1779)
- Santo Domingo (1781)
- San Felipe Apostol (1781)
- San José (1783)
- Santa Ana (1784)
- Salvador del Mundo (1787)
- San Leandro (1787)
- San Telmo (1788)
- Europa (1789)
- Intrépido (1790)
- Reina María Luisa (1791)
- Monarca (1794)
- Montanés (1794)
- Neptuno (1795)
- Argonauta (1796)
- Rey Francisco de Asis (1853)

Note: (a) The name was Fernando, and NOT San Fernando.

=== Frigates ===
- Galga (1752)
- Nuestra Senora del Rosario (1770)
- Nuestra Senora del Carmen (1770)
- Nuestra Senora de la Asuncion (1772)
- Santa Perpetua (1772)
- Santa Maria de la Cabeza (1772)
- Santa Maria Magdalena (1773)
- Santa Margarita (1774)
- Santa Marta (1774)
- Santa Dorotea (1775)
- Santa Clara (1776)
- Santa Leocadia (1777)
- Grana (1778)
- Santa Escolastica (1779)
- Santa Sabina (1781)
- Santa Clause (1781)
- Nuestra Senora de Loreto (1781)
- Santa Rosa (1782)
- Nuestra Senora del Pilar (1782)
- Santa Elena (1783)
- Santa Tecla (1784)
- Santa Maria (1785)
- Nuestra Senora de la Paz (1785)
- Santa Leocadia (1787)
- Santa Teresa (1787)
- Santa Catalina (1787)
- Palas (1789)
- Juno (1789)
- Tetis (1793)
- Pomona (1795)
- Flora (1795)
- Medea (1797)
- La Prueba (1800)
- La Lealtad (1825)
- La Iberia (1825)
- Restauracion (1826)
- Cortes (1836)
- Isabel II (1836)
- Cristina (1837)
- Bailen (1854)
- Berenguela (1857)
- Blanca (1859)
- Lealtad (1860)
- Resolucion (1861)
- Tetuan (1863)
- Almansa (1864)
- Sagunto (1869)
- Navarra (1881)

=== Corvettes ===
- Nuestra Senora de Dolores (1771)
- Nuestra Senora de Atocha (1771)
- Santa Catalina (1778)
- La Cazadora (1779)
- La Diligencia (1796)
- La Fuerte (1801)
- La Indagadora (1807)
- La Ferrolana (1848)
- Circe (1860)
- Santa Lucia (1862)

=== Cargo ships (Urcas) ===
- Nuestra Senora de Monserrat (1772)
- Santa Amalia (1772)
- Santa Ines (1773)
- Santa Polonia (1773)
- Santa Rita (1773)
- Visitacion (1774)
- Presentacion (1774)
- Anunciacion (1774)
- Santa Librada (1777)
- Cargadora (1791)
- Ferrolana (1796)
- Aurora (1797)
- Nina (1851)

=== Brigantines ===
- Nuestra Senora de la Pastoriza (1771)
- Leon (1783)
- El Ligero (1788)
- El Cuervo (1793)
- El Pajaro (1793)
- El Palomo (1795)
- Galgo (1795)
- El Golondrina (1795)
- El Amistad (1799)
- El Trucha (1799)
- Pelayo (1849)
- Alsedo (1851)

=== Sloops (Pailebotes) ===
- San Miguel (1752)
- Santa Eulalia (1775)
- Santa Casilda (1775)
- San Pio (1777)
- San Gil (1777)
- San Roque (1788)
- San Jacinto (1791)
- San Jose (1793)

=== Yachts ===
- La Golondrina (1779)
- Trucha (1780)
- Santa Cristina (1781)
- Santa Irene (1781)
- La Gallega (1797)
- La Brava (1797)
- Nuestra Senora de Atocha (1780)
- Santa Natalia (1780)

=== Schooners ===
- Santa Matilde (1770)
- Pastoriza (1772)
- San Lemes (1778)
- Santa Teresa (1781)
- La Vigilancia (1797)
- La Defensa (1797)
- La Carlota (1798)
- La Brava (1799)
- Alarma (1807)
- Cautela (1807)
- Sata Teresa (1856)
- Narvaez (1857)
- Rosalia (1858)
- Caridad (1860)

=== Sturdy ships (Bombardas) ===
- Santa Ursula (1771)
- Santa Eulalia (1775)
- Santa Casilda (1775)
- Santa Rosa de Lima (1779)

=== Two mast brigantines (Quechemarin) ===
- San Leon (1783)

=== Steamships ===
- Don Jorge Juan (1850)
- Narvaez (1850)
- Don Antonio Ulloa (1851)

=== Gunboats ===
- Salamandra (1874)

== See also ==
- Ferrol city and naval station in north-western Spain. Since the 17th century, it has always been the Spanish Navy's Capital of Maritime Department of the North now re-branded as Spanish Navy's Maritime Intervention Command of Ferrol.
- The Spanish Royal Academy of Naval Engineers (the first of its kind) was created in 1772 in Ferrol during the reign of Charles III of Spain.
- Structure of the Spanish Navy in the 21st century: The Maritime Intervention Command of Ferrol.

== Bibliography ==
- de Saint Hubert, Christian (1984). "Early Spanish Steam Warships, Part II". Warship International. XXI (1). Toledo, OH: International Naval Records Organization: 21–45. ISSN 0043-0374.
