= HMS Imperieuse (1805) =

Fifth-rate frigate of the Royal Navy

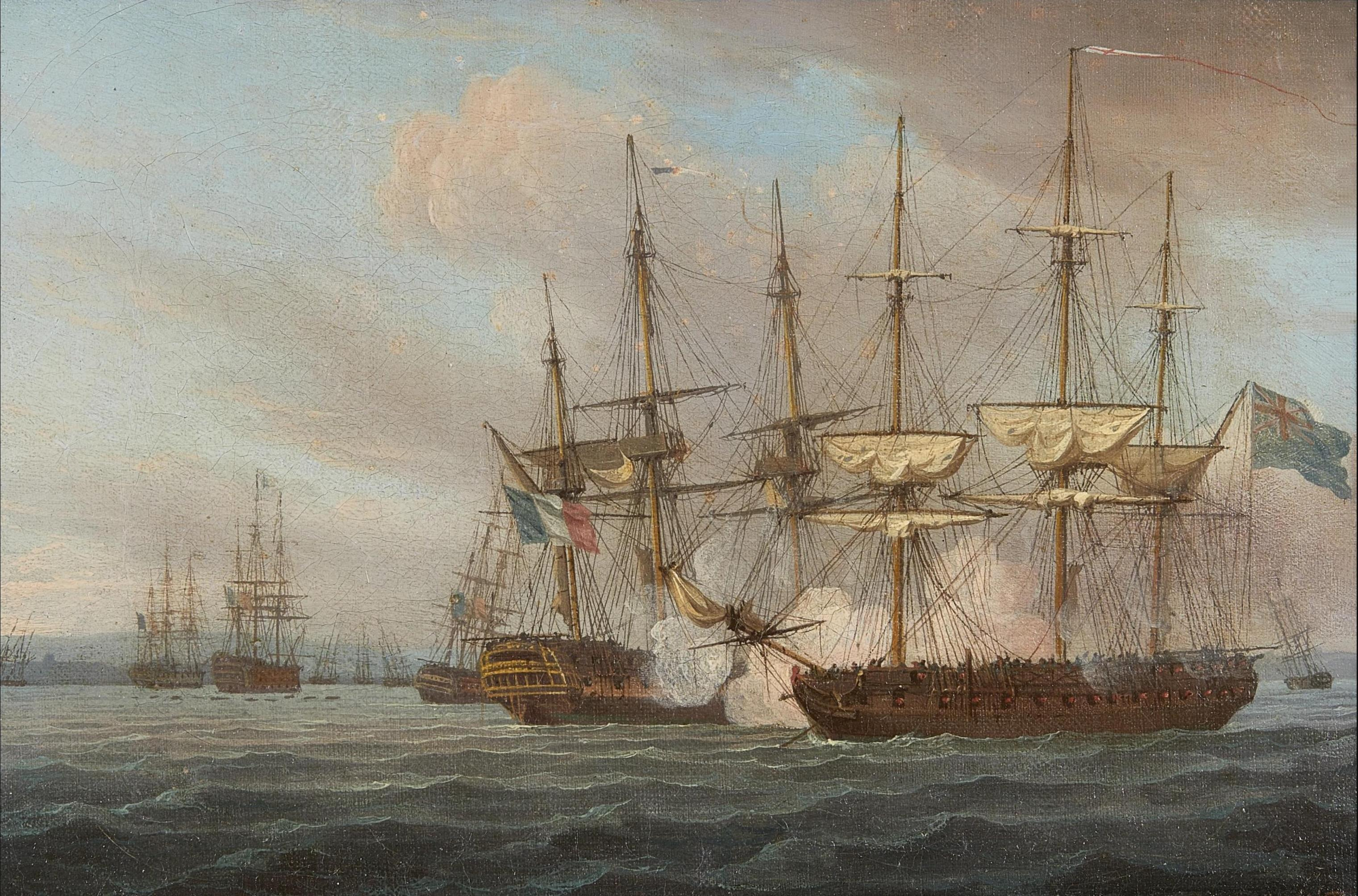
- Imperieuse (first from right) at the Battle of the Basque Roads

History

Spain
- Name: Medea
- Builder: Ferrol shipyard
- Launched: 9 November 1797
- Captured: By the British on 5 October 1804

United Kingdom
- Name: HMS Iphigenia
- Acquired: Captured on 5 October 1804
- Renamed: HMS Imperieuse in 1805
- Reclassified: Quarantine ship from 1818
- Fate: Sold and broken up in 1838

General characteristics
- Class & type: 38-gun fifth-rate frigate
- Tons burthen: 1,04561/94 (bm)
- Length: 147 ft 2 in (44.9 m) (overall); 122 ft 4 in (37.3 m) (keel)
- Beam: 40 ft 1 in (12.2 m)
- Depth of hold: 12 ft (3.7 m)
- Propulsion: Sails
- Sail plan: Full-rigged ship
- Complement: 284 (later 315)
- Armament: British service: Upper deck: 28 × 18-pounder guns; Quarterdeck: 10 × 32-pounder carronades; Forecastle: 2 × 9-pounder and 2 × 32-pounder carronades

HMS Imperieuse was a 38-gun fifth-rate frigate of the Royal Navy. She was originally the Spanish Navy frigate Medea which had been launched at Ferrol in 1797. At the action of 5 October 1804 she was part of a squadron transporting gold from Montevideo to Cádiz when Medea was captured by the British navy. The vessel was subsequently taken into service with the Royal Navy and was briefly named HMS Iphigenia before being renamed Imperieuse in 1805.

In 1806 command of Imperieuse was given to Lord Cochrane. She was dispatched to the Mediterranean where she undertook a series of notable exploits, capturing a large number of war prizes and carrying out raids against enemy positions along the French and Spanish coastline. After a brief return to England, Imperieuse assisted with the attack on the French fleet at Basque Roads in 1809. During the battle she was heavily engaged, assisting with the destruction of four French ships of the line and a frigate. Later that year she took part in the unsuccessful Walcheren Campaign.

In 1811 Imperieuse returned to the Mediterranean under the command of Henry Duncan where she was employed along the coast of Italy, operating with success against Neapolitan and French shipping and shore fortifications. She returned to England in 1814 and was paid off and placed in ordinary the following year. Converted to a quarantine ship in 1818, she was eventually sold and broken up in 1838.

== Spanish service ==
Medea was a 40-gun frigate of the Spanish Navy designed by Julian Martin de Retamosa. She was launched in Ferrol in November 1797, and was given the religious alias Santa Bárbara. Her dimensions were 147 feet 2 inches (44.9 m) along the gun deck, 122 feet 4 1/4 inches (37.3 m) at the keel, with a beam of 40 feet 1 inch (12.2 m) and a depth in the hold of 12 feet (3.7 m). This made her 1,045 61/94 tons burthen (bm).

=== Battle of Cape Santa Maria ===
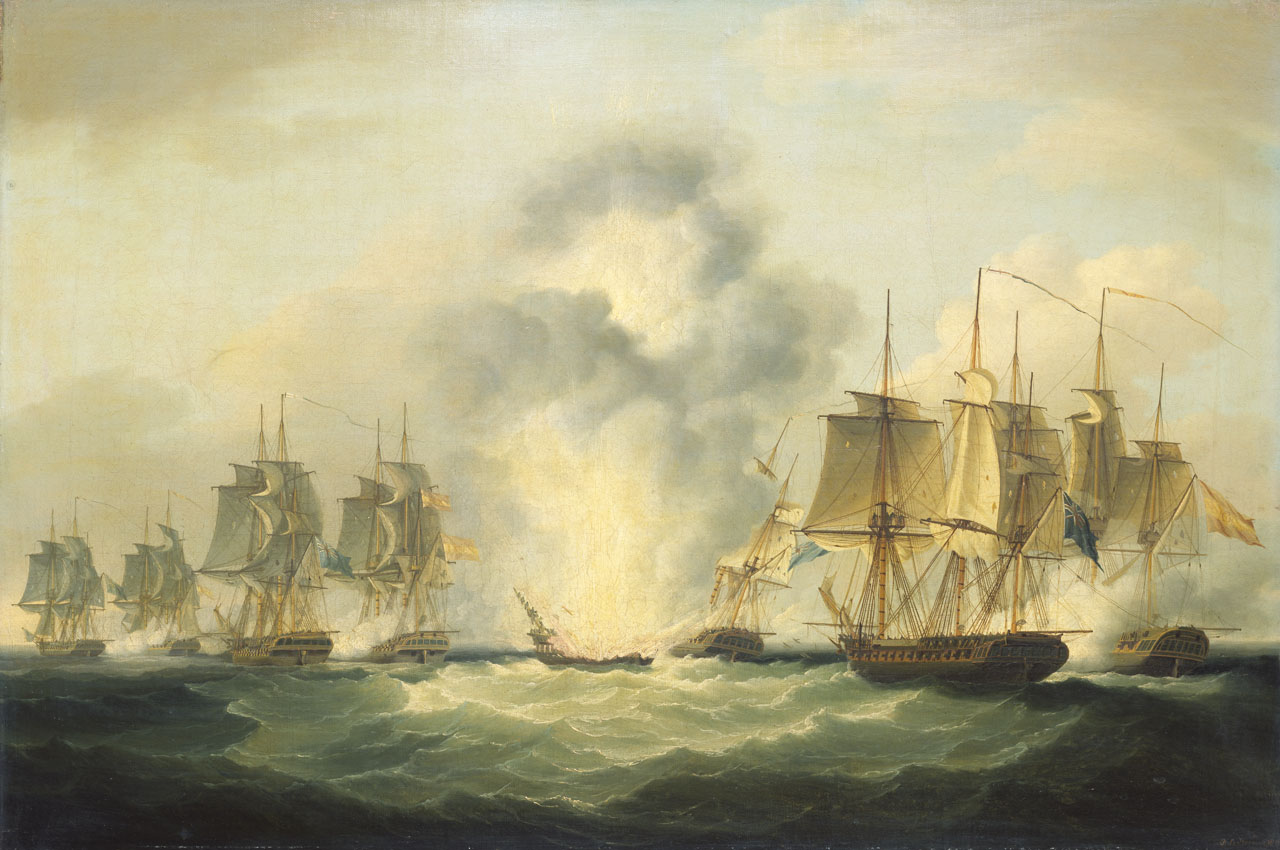
Medea (fourth from left) at the action of 5 October 1804

In August 1804 Medea, commanded by Frigate Captain Francisco de Piedrola y Verdugo, departed Montevideo for Cádiz. She was part of a squadron which also comprised the frigates Fama, Mercedes and Santa Clara and carried Brigadier José de Bustamante y Guerra, who held overall command of the squadron. Receiving intelligence that Bustamante's squadron was transporting gold that was to be used to bolster Spain's finances prior to declaring war on Britain, the Royal Navy sent a squadron of four frigates under Commodore Graham Moore to seize the Spanish ships and their cargo.

The British intercepted the Spanish squadron off the southern coast of Portugal on 5 October and demanded their surrender, which Bustamante refused. HMS Indefatigable, Moore's flagship, fired a warning shot across Medea's bow and a general exchange of fire subsequently broke out between the squadrons. Following ten minutes of combat Mercedes was destroyed by an explosion in her magazine and soon after Santa Clara and Medea, which had been in close action with Indefatigable, both struck their colours. Fama broke away in an attempt to escape but was captured hours later by HMS Lively. Medea suffered two killed and ten wounded. The capture of Bustamante's squadron incited outrage in Spain and on 14 December Charles IV of Spain declared war on Britain.

== British service ==
The captured Medea arrived at Plymouth Dockyard in October 1804 and was subsequently taken into service with the Royal Navy. She was initially registered as HMS Iphigenia but renamed HMS Imperieuse in December 1805. Between February and November 1806 she underwent a large repair at Plymouth. Classed as a 38-gun fifth-rate, she was given twenty-eight 18-pounder (8.2 kg) cannon on the upper deck, ten 32-pounder (15 kg) carronades on the quarterdeck and two 9-pounder (4.1 kg) and two 32-pounder (15 kg) carronades on her forecastle.

=== Bay of Biscay ===
On 2 September 1806 Lord Cochrane was commissioned as the captain of Imperieuse. After her repairs were completed in November, Imperieuse joined a British squadron under Commodore Richard Keats stationed off Basque Roads. Cochrane was given orders to cruise independently of the squadron and captured two prizes off Les Sables d'Olonne on 19 December and another at the entrance of the Garonne on 31 December. On 7 January 1807 a number of boats from Imperieuse led by Lieutenant David Mapleton stormed a fort protecting the Arcachon Bay destroying its battery of four 36-pounders, two field guns and a 13-inch mortar. Requiring repairs to her rudder, Imperieuse returned to Plymouth in February 1807.

=== Mediterranean ===
After Cochrane was given a leave of absence due to ill-health, Captain Alexander Skene took temporary command of Imperieuse and she sailed for Ushant to join a blockading fleet off Brest. She returned to Plymouth in August 1807 whereupon Cochrane resumed command and was given orders to escort a convoy of merchant ships to Malta. She arrived at Valletta in October and proceeded north to join the Mediterranean Fleet off Toulon. On 14 November, Imperieuse encountered an armed polacre off the coast of Montecristo which Cochrane suspected was a Genoese privateer. After the polacre's captain refused to allow boats from Imperieuse to investigate the ship, she was captured in a brief but violent boarding action which cost Imperieuse two killed and 13 wounded, and the privateer one dead and 15 wounded. However, the polacre later proved to be Maltese—a friendly vessel—operating under a letter of marque.

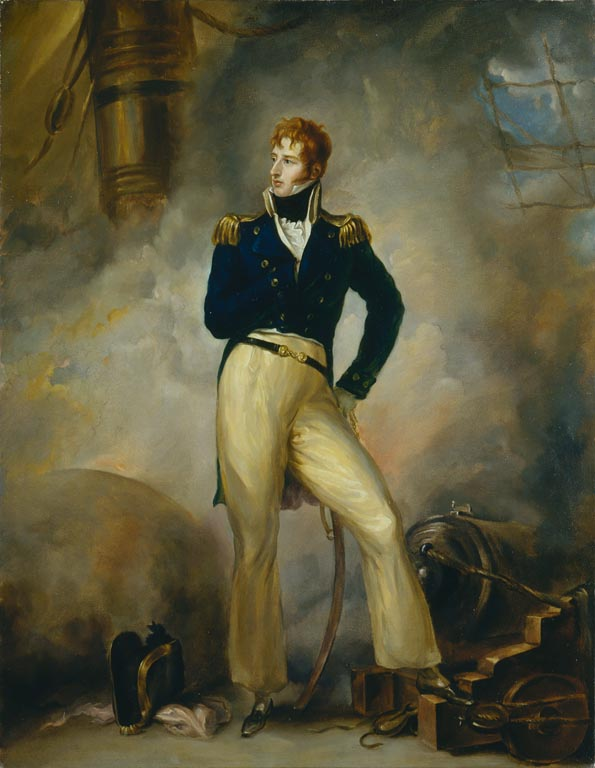
Lord Cochrane's exploits in the Mediterranean earned Imperieuse a reputation as a highly effective coastal raider

In December 1807, Imperieuse was given a two-month cruise in the Adriatic and seized three merchant vessels carrying illegal licences to trade. She was subsequently dispatched to the western Mediterranean in February where she sank two gunboats and captured a third off the coast of Cartagena, Spain. On 21 February 1808 Imperieuse launched a surprise attack on a French privateer—L'Orient—and two merchant vessels moored under the gun batteries at Almeria. Flying a neutral US flag—a legitimate ruse de guerre—she anchored alongside the privateer before swiftly hoisting her British colours and launching her boats in a cutting out expedition led by Lieutenant Edward Hunt Caulfield. Although the Spanish battery consequently opened fire, all three enemy vessels were taken with little damage. During the boarding action Caulfield was killed by a volley of musketry as he leapt aboard the privateer and 10 others were injured. After bringing her prizes in to Gibraltar, Imperieuse sailed for the Balearic Islands on 5 March. Patrolling the coasts of Majorca and Menorca, she captured 10 small prizes and bombarded the Spanish army barracks at Ciutadella. She then proceeded to carry out a series of raids along the coast of Catalonia before returning to Gibraltar for a refit.

In June 1808, Spain switched allegiance and became an ally of Britain, and Cochrane was subsequently given orders by Vice Admiral Lord Collingwood, Commander of the Mediterranean fleet, to assist Spanish efforts to drive the French garrison out of Barcelona. Arriving at Port Mahon on 16 July, Imperieuse, HMS Hind and HMS Kent escorted a convoy of Spanish troops from Majorca to the mainland. Cochrane then proceeded to disrupt the French supply lines sending landing parties ashore to attack the main coastal road between Barcelona and Blanes and assisted Catalan militia in the capture of a castle at Montgat.

Imperieuse arrived off the mouth of the Rhône on 16 August and proceeded to destroy a string of signal stations and barracks along the French coast. On 7 September, Imperieuse was joined by HMS Spartan commanded by Captain Jahleel Brenton, and continued amphibious operations against the French. At dawn on 10 September, boats from Imperieuse and Spartan launched an attack on a series of gun batteries near Port-Vendres. Landing at the southernmost battery, the guns were briskly spiked and barracks blown up. As French troops gathered to respond to the threat, Cochrane and Brenton responded by sending a detachment of boats filled with the ship's boys disguised in the scarlet jackets of the Royal Marines to launch a diversionary attack to the north. Meanwhile, the main assault successfully destroyed the remaining batteries while Imperieuse anchored close to the shore and drove back an advancing body of cavalry with grapeshot. Three days later Imperieuse and Spartan captured five merchant vessels and Spartan subsequently returned to port with the prizes while Imperieuse continued with her cruise.

Imperieuse arrived at the Gulf of Roses in November to assist with the defence of Rosas which was under siege by some 12,000 French and Italian troops under General Honoré Charles Reille. Situated on the coastal road linking France to Barcelona, the town was flanked by a citadel and a fort built on a promontory near the coast. Although a breach had been created by French cannon on high ground to the east, Cochrane assumed command of the fort and brought over two-thirds of his crew ashore to lay booby traps and bolster its defences. After gaining possession of the town the French launched an assault on the fort on 30 November which was repulsed with heavy losses inflicted on the attackers. However, on 5 December, the Spanish garrison in the citadel surrendered and Cochrane found his position in the fort untenable. Covered by the Imperieuse's guns, Cochrane and his men returned to their ship and set off demolition charges which partially destroyed the fort. Continuing northward along the Catalonian coast Imperieuse sighted a convoy of French merchant vessels moored near Cadaqués. Cochrane brought Imperieuse inshore and captured eleven vessels laden with supplies for the French army and the convoy's escorts—a 7-gun cutter and 5-gun lugger.

=== Battle of the Basque Roads ===
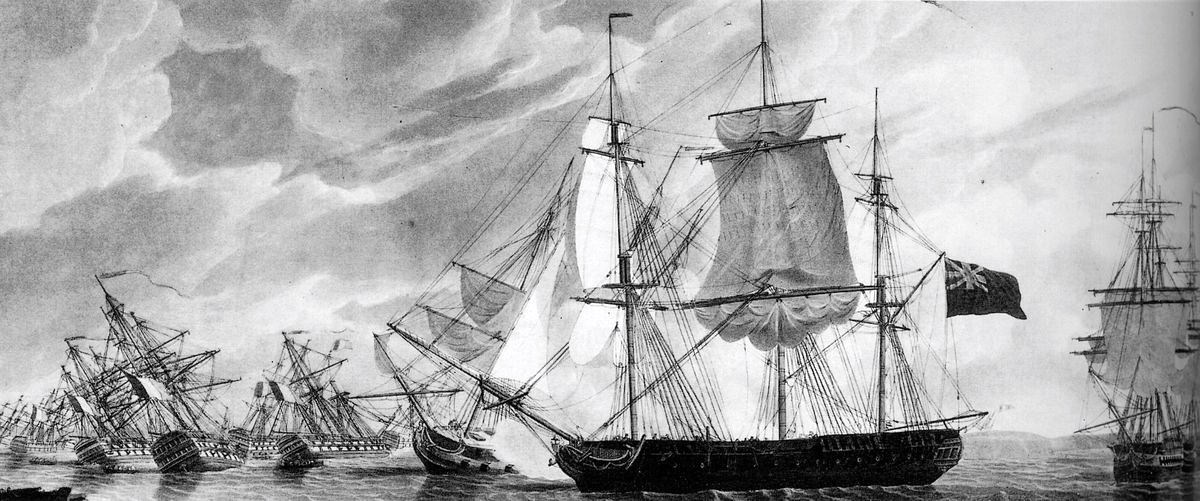
Imperieuse advancing on the grounded French fleet on the morning of 12 April 1809

Imperieuse returned to Plymouth on 19 March 1809 and was ordered to depart again just 10 days later to join Admiral Lord Gambier's blockading squadron at Basque Roads, France. A French fleet lay at anchor in the narrow roadstead and the British Admiralty sought to destroy it by means of a fire ship attack planned and executed by Cochrane. Arriving at Basque Roads on 3 April Cochrane took Imperieuse inshore to reconnoitre the French position and began preparations for an assault against the eleven French ships of the line and two frigates anchored in a narrow channel under the batteries of the Île-d'Aix. On 11 April, three explosion vessels and 20 fire ships were launched against the French position while Imperieuse, Aigle, Pallas, and Unicorn took up position north of the anchorage to receive the crews returning from the fire ships. Although the fire ships inflicted only minor damage, all but two French vessels ran aground in the estuary of the river Charente while attempting to escape the threat.

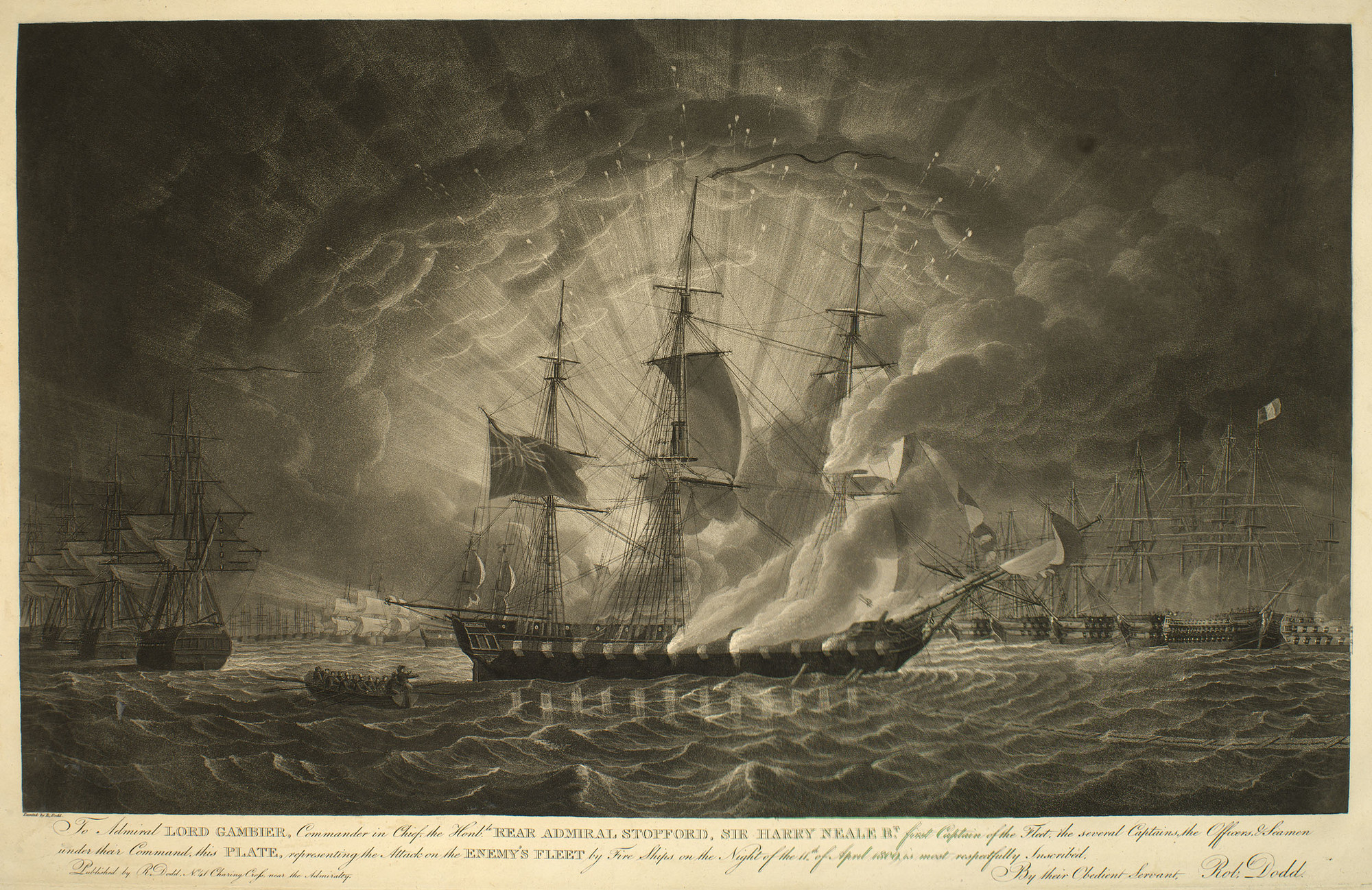
Imperieuse at the battle, by Robert Dodd

Imperieuse was the closest British ship to the anchorage and the first to observe the grounded French fleet at dawn the following day. Cochrane was eager to follow up the attack and spent the morning issuing a frantic series of signals to Gambier imploring him to dispatch the British fleet which were ignored. As a consequence Cochrane allowed Imperieuse to slowly drift towards the French ships and made a final signal which he believed Gambier could not overlook: "The ship is in distress and requires to be assisted immediately". Imperieuse subsequently brought her starboard broadside to bear upon Calcutta, Aquilon, and Ville de Varsovie, and opened fire, inflicting severe damage upon the Calcutta's hull. Gambier reluctantly dispatched a squadron of British ships to support Imperieuse prompting the demoralised crew of the Calcutta to abandon ship. Cochrane sent boats to take possession of her but the vessel was mistakenly set on fire and destroyed. The British reinforcements formed a line of battle and opened fire, forcing the surrender of two ships of the line and the scuttling of another. During the engagement Imperieuse suffered extensive damage to her masts, rigging and sails in addition to three dead and eleven wounded.

The British ships were ordered to return to the main fleet in Basque Roads at dawn the following day but Imperieuse remained—Cochrane argued the orders only applied to his reinforcements—and she was joined by Pallas, Beagle, Aetna, and eight other smaller ships. Cochrane ordered a renewed attack on the remaining grounded ships but it had little effect. On the morning of 14 April Gambier directed a signal of recall to the Imperieuse and the next day she was ordered back to England with Gambier's dispatches.

=== Walcheren Campaign ===
After creating a scandal by publicly denouncing Gambier's conduct at Basque Roads, Cochrane's naval career was ruined and he turned his attention to politics. In June 1809 command of Imperieuse passed to Captain Thomas Garth who set sail from the Downs on 30 July with a large British fleet bound for the Netherlands. The fleet formed part of the unsuccessful Walcheren Campaign – a joint expedition with the army that aimed to destroy French dockyards at Flushing and Antwerp. While ascending the River Scheldt on 16 August, Imperieuse mistakenly entered a channel which took her within range of a fort at Terneuzen. During an exchange of cannonade Imperieuse discharged a number of shells from her carronades, one of which exploded in the fort's magazine. This caused some 3,000 barrels of gunpowder to explode, killing 75 men of the fort's garrison.

=== Return to the Mediterranean ===
On 22 September 1810, Captain Henry Duncan assumed command of Imperieuse in Gibraltar and in June the following year she was dispatched to the Mediterranean to join the Royal Navy's blockading fleet off Toulon. The commander of the fleet, Sir Edward Pellew, gave Imperieuse orders to patrol the coast of Naples and on 11 October Duncan discovered three gunboats moored under a fort at Positano. Boats from Imperieuse under the command of Lieutenant Eaton Stannard Travers were sent to silence the fort. Despite coming under heavy musket fire, the British sailors drove out the fort's defenders and destroyed the battery before returning to their boats and capturing two of the gunboats. During the attack one marine was killed and two crewmen injured while Imperieuse, which had come under heavy fire from the fort, had her foretopsail yard shot away.

Imperieuse was subsequently joined by the 32-gun frigate HMS Thames commanded by Captain Charles Napier. On 19 October, they anchored near Palinuro and dispatched their boats to the shore, capturing 10 armed polacres laden with oil. Two days later they discovered 10 Neapolitan gunboats and several merchant vessels moored under a fort in the port at Palinuro. Deeming their numbers insufficient to attack the port, Duncan dispatched Thames to British-occupied Sicily to request reinforcements and on 28 October she returned with 250 men of the 62nd Regiment of Foot. On 1 November the infantry and a party of marines and sailors launched their attack, capturing the high ground overlooking the harbour. The following morning Imperieuse and Thames bore down on the port and ran along within close range of the gunboats while discharging their broadsides, sinking two of the vessels and forcing the surrender of the others. They then anchored close to the fort and commenced a brisk cannonade that forced the fort to surrender within 30 minutes. Over the next two days the fort was blown up and once the troops re-embarked the two frigates departed with six gunboats and 22 feluccas and 20 large spars.

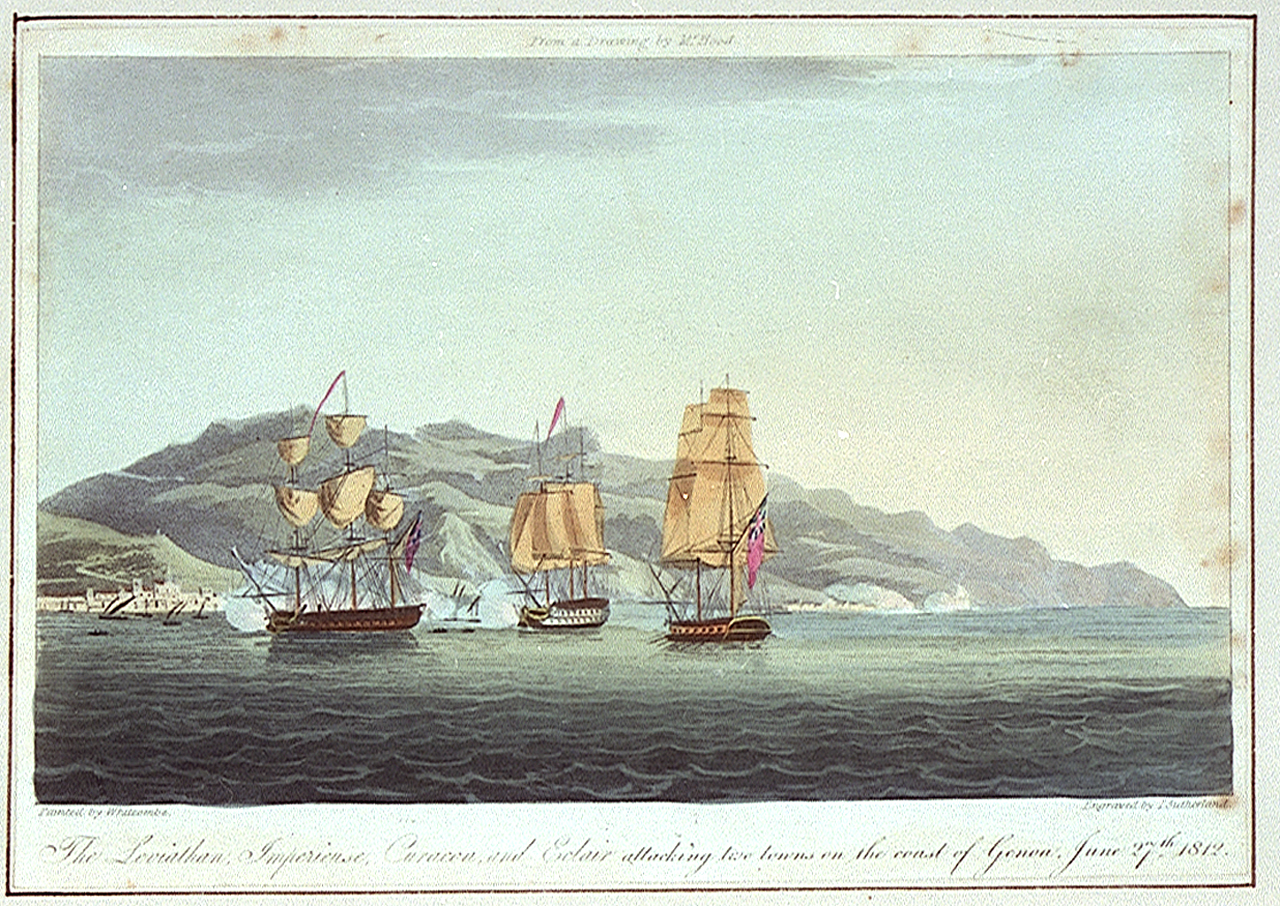
The Leviathan, Imperieuse, Curacoa, and Eclair attacking two towns on the coast of Genoa, June 27th 1812

In June 1812, Imperieuse was part of a squadron commanded by Captain Patrick Campbell of the 74-gun ship of the line HMS Leviathan patrolling the western coast of Italy. On 27 June, the squadron launched boats to attack a convoy of 18 French vessels anchored off Alassio and Laigueglia. Although the British destroyed two batteries on the shore, they encountered heavy resistance from the French defenders. Attempts to bring off the French vessels were abandoned and they were instead destroyed by the British guns. While carrying out the expedition Imperieuse sustained four killed and eleven wounded.

Later that year Imperieuse returned to Port Mahon for an extensive refit and while she was undergoing repairs Duncan was offered the command of the frigates HMS Resistance and HMS Undaunted. However, he decided to remain with Imperieuse after receiving a letter from the crew expressing their admiration for the captain and their desire for him to remain with the ship. In April 1813 Imperieuse departed Mahon leading a squadron of three frigates and two brigs to resume the blockade of Naples.

In September the squadron arrived off the Port of Anzio where it discovered a French convoy of 29 merchant vessels protected by two batteries on a mole, a tower to the north and another battery covering the mole to the south. The squadron was reinforced by the 74-gun HMS Edinburgh under Captain George Dundas on 5 October and an attack on the port was launched that same day. Imperieuse and Resistance took up position opposite the mole, HMS Swallow anchored near the tower while HMS Eclair, HMS Pylades and Edinburgh took station alongside the covering battery. After opening fire, a landing party led by Lieutenant Travers captured the southern battery while another of Imperieuse's officers, Lieutenant Mapleton, led a party that took possession of the mole. The batteries were subsequently blown up by the British and the entire convoy was captured without any losses sustained by the attackers.

== Fate ==
After the Treaty of Paris and the end of hostilities with France, Imperieuse returned to England in July 1814 and upon arrival Duncan was appointed to the newly built fifth-rate frigate HMS Glasgow. Imperieuse briefly came under the command of Captain Philip Dumaresq and Captain Joseph James before she was paid off and placed in ordinary at Sheerness in 1815. In 1818 she was converted to a lazarette (quarantine ship) and moved to Stangate Creek in the estuary of the River Medway. In September 1838, she was sold at Sheerness for £1,705 and subsequently broken up at Rotherhithe.
