= Diego de Alvear y Ponce de León =

Spanish military commander and politician

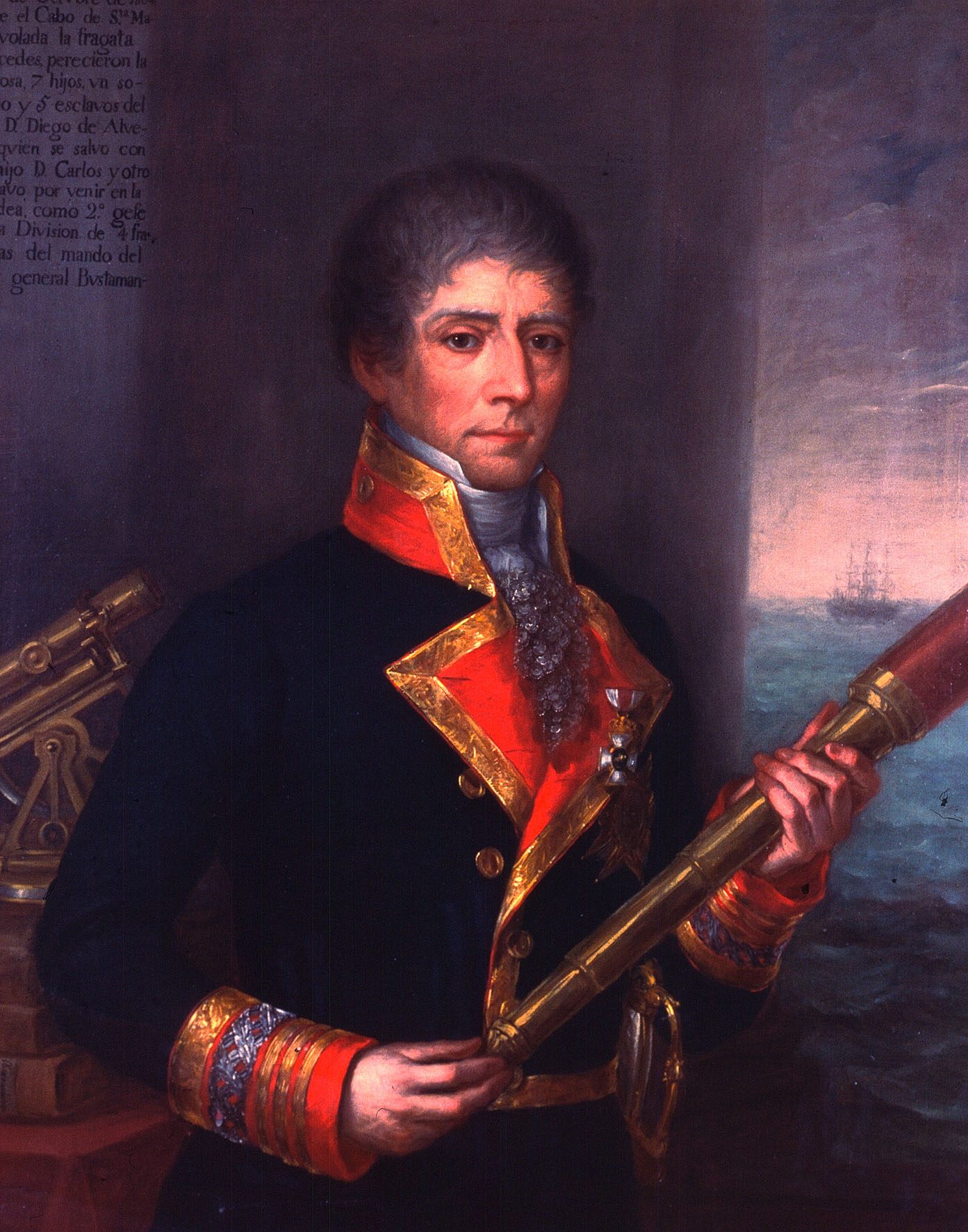
Diego de Alvear y Ponce de León

Diego de Alvear y Ponce de León (1749–1830) was a Spanish military commander and politician.

A grandson of the founder of the "Alvear" wine company of Montilla, he was the father of the Argentine politician Carlos María de Alvear, grandfather of another Argentine politician, Torcuato de Alvear, and great-grandfather of Marcelo Torcuato de Alvear, the president of Argentina between 1922 and 1928.

He took the name of his grandfather, Diego de Alvear y Escalera, the founder of Alvear. Ponce de León belonged, therefore, to an important family of wine growers in Andalusia.

== Political and military career in the colonies ==
Viceroyalty of the Río de la Plata in 1783. Jurisdiction over western Patagonia to the Magellan strait and the coast of Atacama in the Pacific, considered by the Chilean historians as belonging to the Capitanía General de Chile

He studied in Jesuit schools, first in Montilla and later at Granada, until the expulsion of the Jesuits in 1767. After entering the Spanish navy as midshipman (1770), he arrived at the Rio de la Plata in 1774 and fought in the "Sacramento War" (also known as "Ceballos Expedition" 1776-1777). Its name derives from a colonial conflict between Spain and Portugal for control of Colonia del Sacramento in what today is Uruguay, where the Spanish forces were commanded by Pedro de Cevallos. After a favorable resolution to Spanish interests, Charles III created the Viceroyalty of the Río de la Plata and named general Pedro de Cevallos as viceroy.

It was on this new viceroyalty where Diego de Alvear y Ponce de León lived for almost thirty years. He continued his ascending military career reaching the rank of general and in 1781 wed María Balbastro, with whom he had nine children.

Among the works during this stage in his life, he worked on the delineation of the border between Spanish and Portuguese territories. It was an endeavor started by king Charles III, where political objectives and military ideals where mixed. After the aforementioned colonial conflict, both kingdoms decided to clearly mark the borders of their colonial possessions. Charles III ordered that to accomplish this task, they had to divide the border in five sections to be studied separately. Diego de Alvear received command of the task for one of these sections to be studied, which encompassed the areas around the Paraná and Paraguay rivers. Here he spent 18 years (1782–1800) doing Topography work, botanic studies and preparing reports on the Tupi and Guarani peoples.

== Battle of Cabo Santa María ==
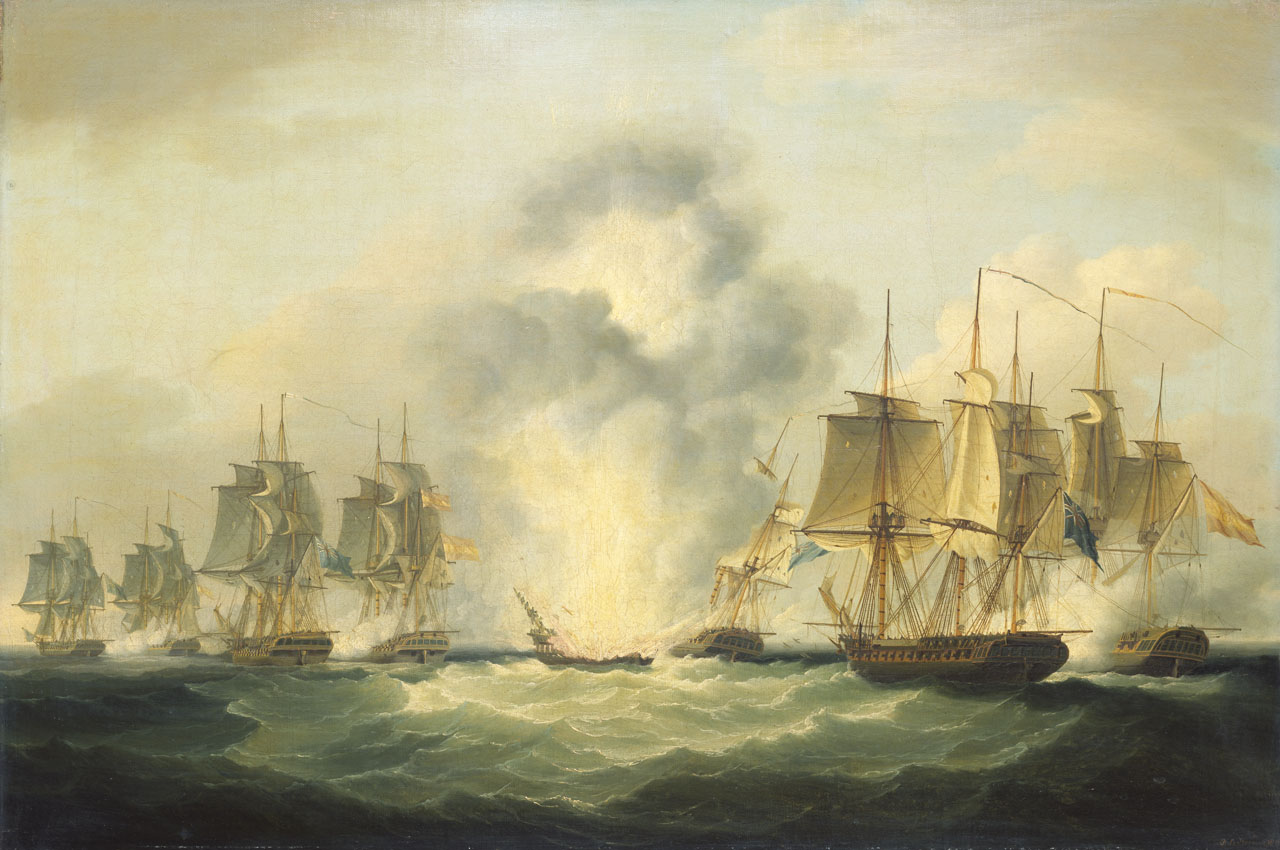
Bustamante's flotilla being intercepted by four British frigates commanded by Moore; Amphion reaches the Mercedes (by Francis Sartorius)

On August 7, 1804 Diego de Alvear, already a general, embarked in Montevideo en route to Spain in the frigate "Mercedes" carrying with him the riches accumulated after those many years of service in the River Plate area, and also his wife and children. The flotilla, headed for Cádiz, was composed of four frigates commanded by José de Bustamante y Guerra.

On October 5, 1804, near the Portuguese coast of Algarve, the Spanish ships were met by a Royal Navy flotilla, with the British commander demanding that the Spanish flotilla proceed to a British-controlled port for inspection. Diego Alvear and his son Carlos María were called to the flagship Medea, to serve as interpreters as they spoke English. The encounter soon turned into a battle, and a Royal Navy carronade soon hit the "Mercedes", which sank, carrying with her Don Diego's riches and the life of his wife and children. The only surviving son was Carlos María, who was with him. Two months later, in December 1804, Spain declared war on Great Britain.

== Second marriage and return to Spain ==
After the sinking of the Mercedes, the flotilla was captured and sailed to England where Diego de Alvear was made prisoner, but with honours and privileges. The tragic family loss was not lost on the British to the point that the British government decided to reimburse don Diego part of his economic losses due to the sinking of the Mercedes.

During his captivity he met, going to mass, the young Irish Luisa Ward, whom he would later marry and have ten children. In December 1805 he returned to Spain and in 1806 arrived in Madrid. As said Diego de Alvear married Luisa on January 20, 1807, in Montilla (Córdoba, Spain).

== Spanish War of Independence and defense of Cádiz ==
In August 1807, Alvear was put in charge of the artillery units defending the city of Cádiz, where he would distinguish himself defending the city from the French troops, who had invaded Spain in 1808.

Diego de Alvear organized the city's defenses, having been one of his first successes to get the French Rosilly flotilla, interned in Cádiz Bay until then (as until a month and a half before France had been an ally) surrender in June 1808. Another important task was the reorganization of Cádiz's militias, a corps of two thousand volunteers called the "Distinguished Volunteers of Cádiz".

In March 1810, Diego de Alvear was named military governor of the Isle of León (today San Fernando) and his success at the defense of Cádiz would get him the Gran Cruz de Hermenegildo decoration. The writer José de Espronceda would later dedicate a poem to him: "To Don Diego de Alvear".

== Ferdinand VII reign: fight between liberals and absolutists ==
After the War of Independence, Diego de Alvear requested permission to travel to England. The request was accepted and he lived in Great Britain between 1814 and 1817. Upon his return in 1817, he lived as a recluse in Montilla in the family's wine growing business, even though the political events of the country would lead him to actively participate once more. In 1820 Spain instituted the "Trienio Liberal" and in 1821 a series of movements by military forces quartered in Córdoba would try to reinstate absolutist power. Diego de Alvear was opposed to this and organized a volunteer militia in Montilla, resisting the absolutist rebels until the arrival of reinforcements which ended the movement. As an award for his actions, he was named in 1822 Commander of the Montilla Militia and in 1823 he returned to Cádiz.

The restoration of absolutism in 1823 forced him to return to Montilla, be detained and released several times and caused a serious economic loss. He also lost, and had reinstated his titles and honours in several occasions, at the whim of the crown, until 1829 when he finally recuperates all his titles and honors. He died in Madrid, on January 15, 1830.

== A man of culture ==
Don Diego spoke several languages: Spanish, Latin, English, French, Italian, Portuguese and some Tupí and Guaraní, having learned these two latter ones during his geographic work in the colonial sector he commanded. He also had great mathematical and astronomical knowledge, connected with his military activities in the navy and army artillery and the work he did delimiting the colonial possession borders between Spain and Portugal in the River Plate area.

He wrote several books, including "Descripción de Buenos Aires" (Descriptions of Buenos Aires) and "Demarcación de los territorios de España y Portugal" (demarcation between the territories of Spain and Portugal).

== Modern times: the finding of the wreck of the Mercedes ==
The wreck of the frigate Mercedes, whose sinking caused the death of Alvear's first wife and his children, was recently found and salvaged by the treasure hunter company Odyssey Marine Exploration between March and May 2007. This company, using Gibraltar as base, has recovered enormous quantities of silver and gold coins, plus cannon and copper ingots from the wreck. Most of these were sent to the United States by cargo plane from Gibraltar. The Spanish government has sued the company on this issue.

== Bibliography ==
- Alvear y Ward, Sabina. "Historia de Don Diego de Alvear y Ponce de León", Madrid 1891, cit. en Marrast, R. (ed.) "José de Espronceda.Poesía lírica y fragmentos épicos", ed. Castalia, 1979. ISBN 84-7039-097-X, págs. 146-147.
