= Spanish ship Europa =

Warship

History

Spain
- Name: Europa
- Operator: Spanish Navy
- Builder: Reales Astilleros de Esteiro shipyards
- Laid down: 1789
- Launched: 19 October 1789
- In service: 1789–1801
- Fate: Abandoned as a wreck in 1801

General characteristics
- Type: Ship of the line
- Tons burthen: 1640 tons
- Length: 190 ft
- Beam: 52 ft
- Depth: 25 ft
- Decks: Three
- Propulsion: Sail
- Armament: 28 × 24-pounder cannon; 30 × 18-pounder cannon; 16 × 8-pounder cannon

Europa was a 74-gun ship of the line of the Spanish Navy. She was launched in 1789 and served in the Spanish navy for 11 years before being abandoned as a wreck in Manila Harbor in 1801.

== History ==
Europa was laid down at the Reales Astilleros de Esteiro shipyards in Ferrol, Spain in 1789. She was designed by Spanish naval architect José Romero y Fernández de Landa as a third-rate, two decked seventy-four gun ship of the line. Following her completion, Europa joined the Spanish European Fleet. After several years of service, Europa was reassigned to service in the Pacific, and so she departed Spain for Concepcion, Chile, arriving in February 1796. She departed Concepcion for Manila in the Spanish Philippines on 10 October 1796 accompanied by her fellow third-rates Montañes and San Pedro along with two 34-gun frigates, Pilar and Fama.

=== Pacific service ===
Following her arrival in Manila, Europa her squadron operated out of the port city during the French Revolutionary Wars and the concurrent Anglo-Spanish War. In April 1797 the ships of the squadron were badly damaged by a typhoon, forcing the Spanish to dock and de-mast the ships for extensive repairs at Cavite. A British squadron under Edward Cooke raided Manila in January 1798, and found Europa to be one of the Spanish ships undergoing repairs there.

In January 1799 Europa, Montañes, and two Spanish frigates departed Manila under the command of Ignacio María de Álava. de Navarrete sailed the fleet to Southern China, where he intended to intercept Britain's annual – and extremely valuable – convoy of merchants returning to Europe from Canton. The Spanish ships arrived at the mouth of the Pearl River near Macau in late January, where they were joined by two French frigates. On 27 January the allied fleet fought an inconclusive engagement against a force of British warships sent to escort the convoy. During the battle, the larger Europa attempted to pursue the lighter HMS Intrepid, but damage to Montañes forced de Navarrete to break off his attack and order a withdraw to Manila. Europa and Fama were again sent to Macau in May 1799, but failed to intercept any British ships.

After her return to Manila, Europa fell into disrepair and was no longer fit for service. By 1801, she was reportedly a rotting wreck in Manila harbor.
