= Action of 5 October 1804 =

1804 battle of the Napoleonic Wars

Coordinates: 36.89663°N 7.895033°W

- Part of the Napoleonic Wars
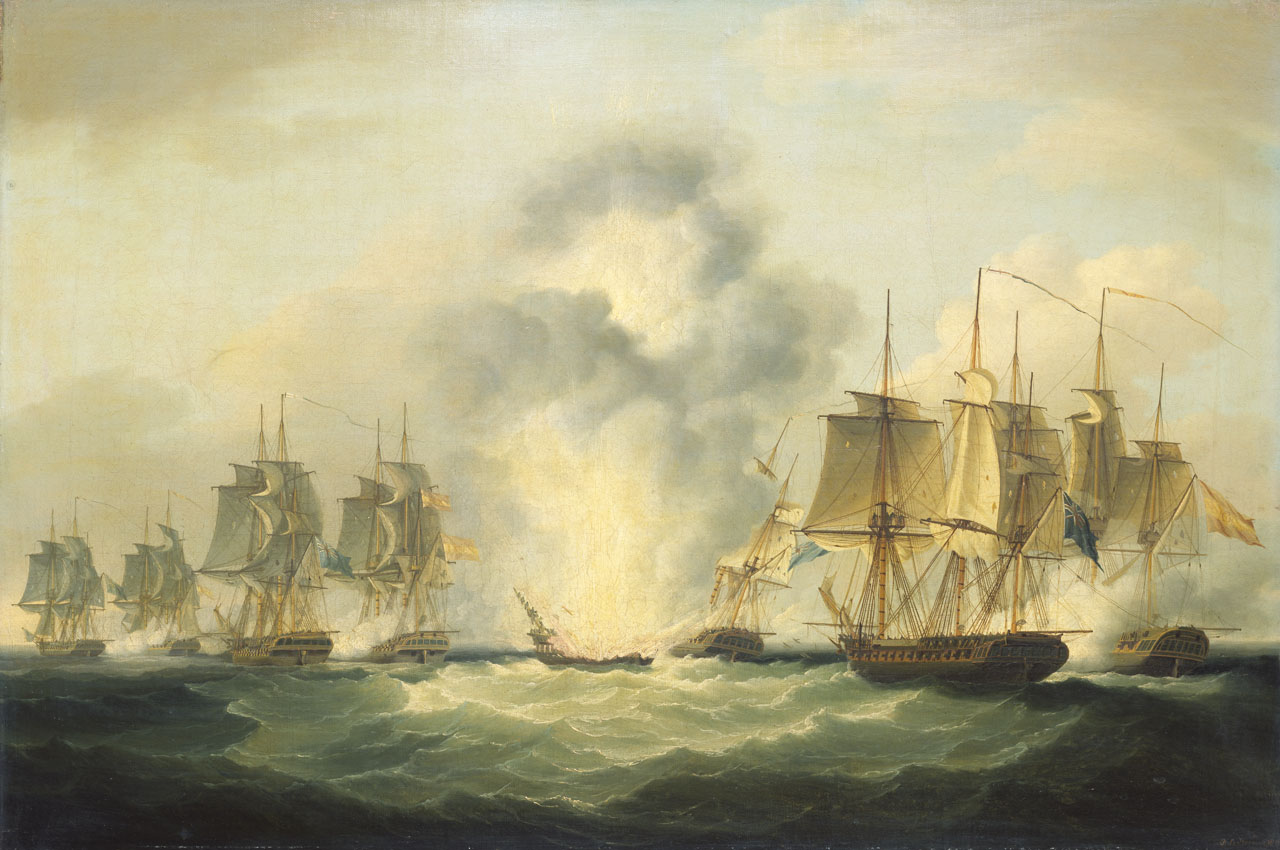
- The action of 5 October 1804; Francis Sartorius, 1807
Date	5 October 1804
Location	Off Cabo de Santa Maria, Atlantic Ocean
Result	British victory

Belligerents
United Kingdom	Spain

Commanders and leaders
Graham Moore	José de Bustamante (surrendered)

Strength
4 frigates	4 frigates

Casualties and losses
9 killed or wounded	349 killed or wounded 600 captured 3 frigates captured 1 frigate destroyed

The action of 5 October 1804 was fought off Cabo de Santa Maria during the Napoleonic Wars. In the engagement, a British squadron under Commodore Graham Moore attacked a Spanish squadron led by Brigadier José de Bustamante. Although Britain and Spain were at peace at the time, the British had received intelligence that Bustamante's squadron was transporting gold from Montevideo to Cádiz to bolster Spain's finances before the Spanish declared war on Britain. Moore's squadron destroyed one Spanish frigate and captured the other three, ensuring that none of the transported gold reached Spain. The engagement incited outrage in Spain and on December 1804 Charles IV of Spain declared war on Britain.

== Background ==
Under the terms of a secret convention Spain had to pay 72 million francs annually to France until it declared war on Britain. The British had learned of the treaty, and knew it was likely that Spain would declare war soon after the arrival of the treasure ships. Since the British also knew that by law the fleet could only land at Cádiz, as well as its place and approximate time of departure from South America, it was not difficult to position a squadron to intercept it.

Bustamante had set sail from Montevideo on 9 August 1804 with four frigates loaded with gold and silver, as well as much other valuable cargo. On 22 September Admiral Cornwallis ordered Captain Graham Moore, commanding the 44-gun razee frigate HMS Indefatigable, to intercept and detain the Spanish ships, peacefully, if possible.

Moore's ship arrived off Cadiz on 29 September and was joined on 2 October by HMS Lively, and by HMS Medusa and HMS Amphion the day after. In line abreast they patrolled the approaches to Cádiz.

== Battle ==
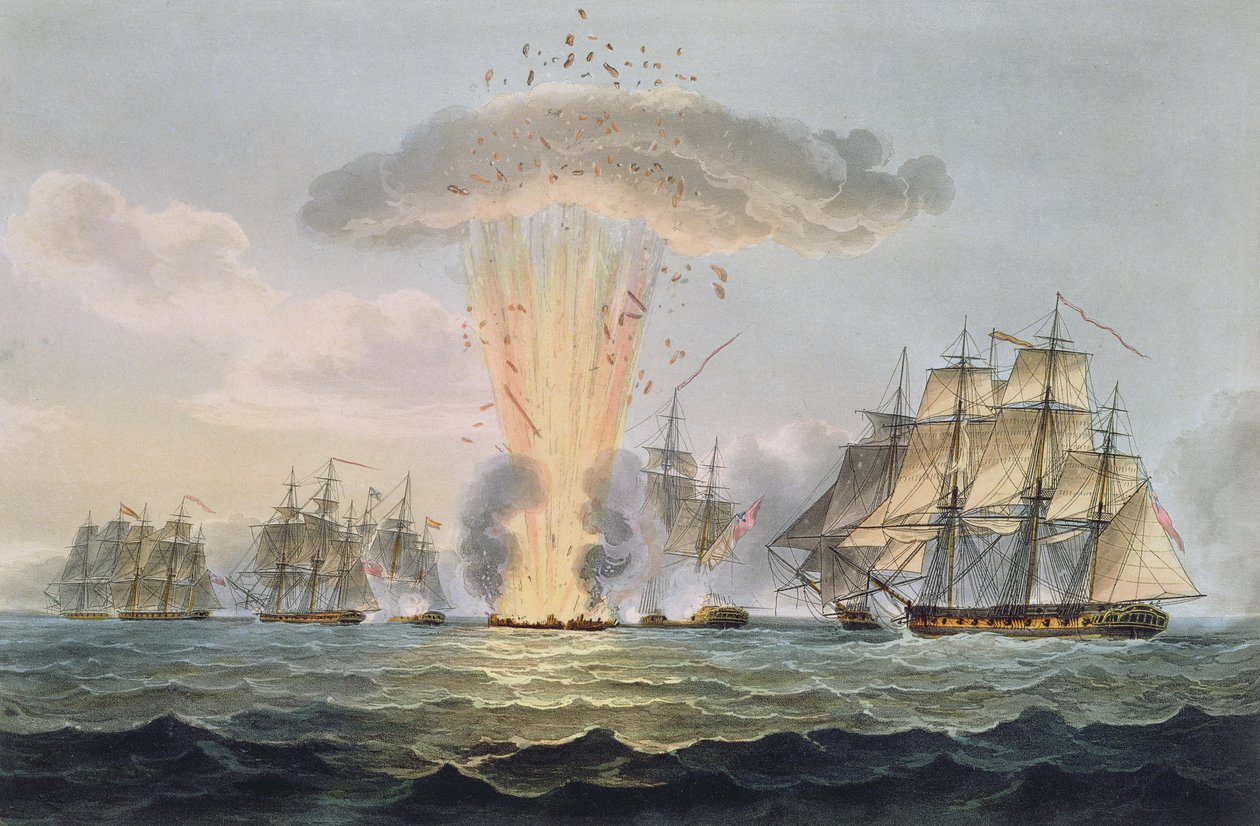
Nuestra Señora de las Mercedes blowing up at the action

At dawn on 5 October, the Spanish frigates sighted the coast of Portugal. At 7 a.m. they sighted the four British frigates. Bustamante ordered his ships into line of battle, and within an hour the British came up in line, to windward of the Spaniards and "within pistol-shot". Moore, the British Commodore, sent Lieutenant Ascott to the Spanish flagship Medea, to explain his orders. Bustamante naturally refused to surrender and, impatient of delays, at 10 a.m. Moore ordered a shot be fired ahead over the bows of Medea. Almost immediately a general exchange of fire broke out.

Within ten minutes the magazine of Nuestra Señora de las Mercedes exploded, destroying the ship and killing all but 40 of her 240 crew, including almost the entire family of the future Supreme Director of the United Provinces of the Río de la Plata, Carlos María de Alvear, who (being 16 years old at the time) witnessed the explosion alongside his father from the Medea. Within half an hour the Santa Clara and the Medea had surrendered. Fama broke away and tried to flee; Medusa quickly followed. Moore ordered the faster Lively to pursue, capturing Fama a few hours later. The three frigates were taken to Gibraltar, and then to Gosport, England.

== Aftermath ==
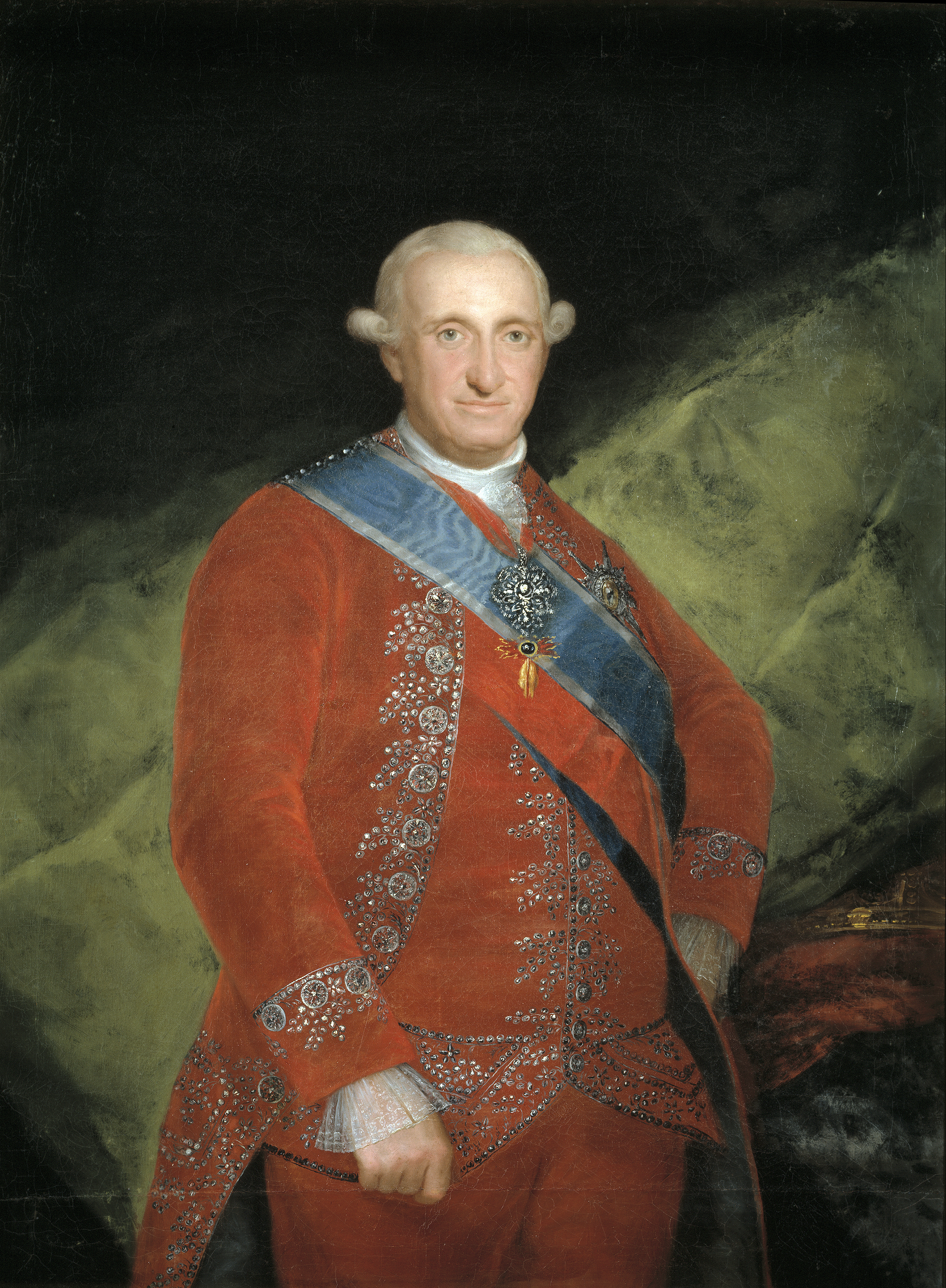
Charles IV of Spain, who declared war on Britain following the action

In practical terms, the British interception of the four Real Armada frigates represented the end of an era for Bourbon Spain and regular specie shipments from the Spanish Empire's New World mines and mints. The squadron to which Mercedes belonged was the last of its kind that the world would see: a Spanish treasure fleet moving bullion from the New World Viceroyalties to the Iberian kingdoms.

Under the terms of the Cruizers and Convoys Act 1708 (6 Ann. c. 65) ships captured at sea were "Droits of the Crown" and became the property of their captors, who received the full value of the ships and cargo in prize money. Technically Britain and Spain were not at war at the time of the action, so the seizure of the ships and their cargo was an act of piracy and the Admiralty Court ruled that the three ships were "Droits of the Admiralty", and all revenues would revert to them. The four Spanish ships carried a total of 4,286,508 Spanish dollars in silver and gold coin, as well as 150,000 gold ingots, 75 sacks of wool, 1,666 bars of tin, 571 pigs of copper, seal skins and oil, although 1.2 million in silver, half the copper and a quarter of the tin went down with the Mercedes. Still, the remaining ships and cargo were assessed at a value of £900,000 (equivalent to £91 million in 2024). After much legal argument an ex gratia payment was made amounting to £160,000, of which the four captains would have each received £15,000 (equivalent to £1.5 million in 2024). Captain Gore had previously received an even greater sum as captain of HMS Triton in the similar Action of 16 October 1799.

Medea was taken into the Royal Navy as HMS Iphigenia (later renamed HMS Imperieuse), Santa Clara as HMS Leocadia and Fama as HMS Fama. The attack incited outrage in Spain and Charles IV of Spain declared war on Britain on 14 December 1804, though the Spanish navy suffered a catastrophic defeat less than a year later at the Battle of Trafalgar in October 1805. Napoleon, having crowned himself Emperor on 2 December, gained Spain as an ally in his war against Britain.

== Order of battle ==
=== Spain ===
- Medea 40-gun frigate, Flagship carrying Admiral Bustamante, commanded by Capitán Francisco de Piedrola y Verdugo
- Fama 34-gun frigate, Capitán Miguel Zapiain y Valladares
- Mercedes 36-gun frigate, Capitán Jose Manuel De Goicoa y Labart
- Santa Clara 34-gun frigate, Capitán Aleson y Bueno

=== Britain ===
- HMS Indefatigable 44-gun frigate, Flagship, Commodore Graham Moore
- HMS Lively 38-gun frigate, Captain Graham Eden Hamond
- HMS Amphion 32-gun frigate, Captain Samuel Sutton
- HMS Medusa 32-gun frigate, Captain John Gore
