= William Hargood =

Royal Navy officer (1762–1839)

Admiral Sir William Hargood GCH KCB
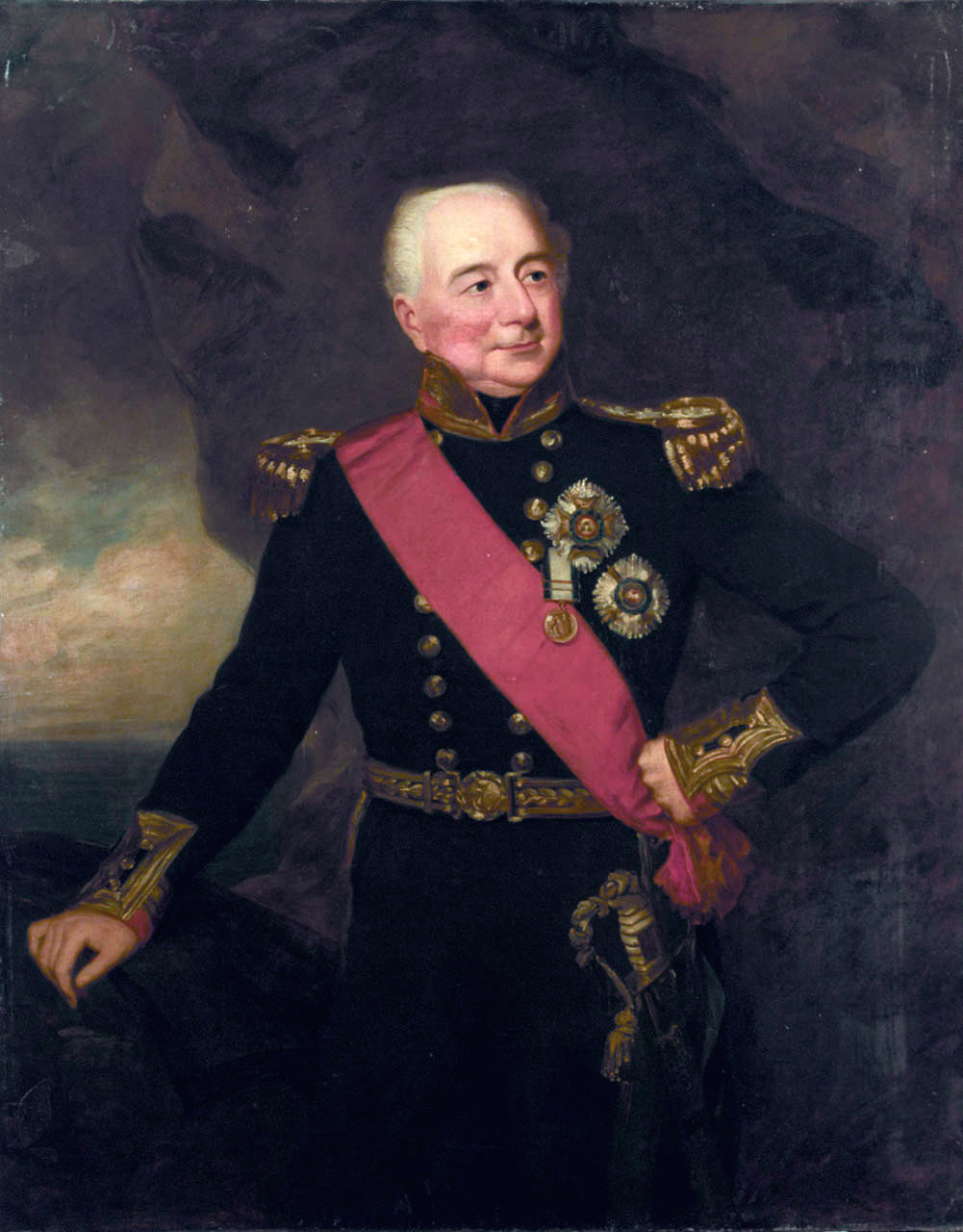
- Portrait by Frederick Richard Say, c. 1835
- Born: 6 May 1762
- Died: 12 December 1839 (aged 77); Bath, Somerset
- Military career
- Allegiance: Great Britain; United Kingdom
- Branch: Royal Navy
- Service years: 1775–1835
- Rank: Admiral of the White
- Commands: Plymouth Station
- Conflicts: American War of Independence; French Revolutionary War; Napoleonic Wars
- Awards: Knight Commander of the Order of the Bath; Knight Grand Cross of the Royal Guelphic Order

Signature
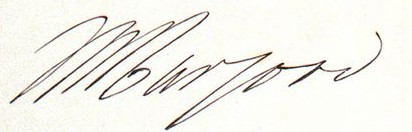

Admiral of the White Sir William Hargood GCH KCB (6 May 1762 – 12 December 1839) was a Royal Navy officer who served in the American War of Independence and French Revolutionary and Napoleonic Wars, during which he gained an unfortunate reputation for bad luck, which seemed to reverse following his courageous actions at the battle of Trafalgar in command of HMS Belleisle.

== Military service ==
Born in 1762 into a Royal Navy Dockyard family, the son of a Clerk of the Survey, Hargood was able to secure a position as a midshipman on HMS Triumph, on which he served from 1775 until the following year, in which time he made a convoy to Newfoundland, and then moved to HMS Bristol in which he saw the West Indies and American Eastern Seaboard, being heavily in involved in the landing at Fort Moultrie in 1776. In 1781, Hargood was a lieutenant, serving in the sloop HMS Port Royal when Pensacola fell to the Spanish despite his best efforts to keep it supplied, and in 1782 he was on board HMS Magnificent at the battle of the Saintes. Hargood continued in service in American waters beyond the end of the war, remaining there until he met Captain William Henry (who in 1830 would succeed his brother to become King of the United Kingdom). The two became firm friends, and William took him as his first lieutenant aboard the frigate HMS Pegasus and then HMS Andromeda, procuring his promotion in 1789 to commander and getting him the sloop HMS Swallow, which he commanded for a year off Ireland before moving to HMS Hyaena and the West Indies when he was made a Post Captain.

Captured by the French in 1793 along with his ship, Hargood was exchanged and honourably acquitted and in 1796 given the 50 gun HMS Leopard, a command which ended in disaster, when he was deposed ashore during the Spithead mutiny. Moving to HMS Nassau and then HMS Intrepid, Hargood convoyed a fleet of East Indiamen to China, where he remained until the Peace of Amiens in 1803, defending Macau at the Macau Incident of January 1799. On his return at the outbreak of war, he was given the ship of the line HMS Belleisle, a good ship captured from the French in the battle of Groix in 1795. Joining Nelson's fleet in the Mediterranean, Hargood participated in the chase across the Atlantic, and his ship was so worn out it required a refit at Plymouth, only rejoining the fleet two weeks before the battle on 21 October.

During the battle, Belleisle was second in Collingwood's division, following the flagship HMS Royal Sovereign into the enemy lines by just fifteen minutes, and when there held his fire until he was able to discharge both sides simultaneously into the Fougueux and Santa Ana. Belleisle was engaged continuously during the action, often fighting alone against numerous enemy ships, before finally attaching herself to the Argonauta, which she boarded and captured, but not before she was herself dismasted. Belleisle took almost 25% casualties, with 33 dead and 93 wounded, including Hargood, who had suffered severe bruising during the cannonade. Belleisle was lucky to survive the storm, only the constant attentions of the frigate HMS Naiad allowing her to be slowly towed back to Gibraltar.

Following the battle, Hargood, who had been unable to get a favourable commission until this point was suddenly inundated with offers, and after some lucrative shore duties, he was made a rear-admiral and given command of the Channel Islands squadron, which made numerous raids on the French coast and collected a lot of prize money. In 1811 he married Maria Cocks, and they lived happily together until his death despite their failure to have any children. Following the peace in 1815, Hargood retired from the sea, but retained shore duties, and between this date and his death twenty four years later at his home in Bath, he was made a vice admiral, Knight Grand Cross of the Order of the Bath, a Knight Grand Cross of the Royal Guelphic Order, a full Admiral of the White and Commander-in-Chief, Plymouth. Throughout his life he also retained a close and personal friendship with William Henry, even after the latter became King William IV in 1830. He retired to Bath residing at number 9 Royal Crescent until his death and was buried in Bath Abbey where his much faded tombstone can still be seen, along with a lengthy epitaph on a mounted wall plaque.

Military offices
| Preceded by Sir Manley Dixon | Commander-in-Chief, Plymouth; 1833–1836 | Succeeded by Lord Amelius Beauclerk |
