= HMS Medusa (1801) =

Frigate of the Royal Navy

- Ship plane of Medusa

History

United Kingdom
- Name: Medusa
- Ordered: 28 January 1800
- Builder: Pitcher, Northfleet
- Laid down: April 1800
- Launched: 14 April 1801
- Commissioned: 25 April 1801
- Decommissioned: 17 November 1813
- Fate: Broken up, 1816

General characteristics
- Class & type: Amphion-class Fifth-rate frigate
- Tons burthen: 920 tons bm
- Length: 144 ft (44 m) (gun deck); 121 ft 6 in (37.03 m) (keel)
- Beam: 37 ft 8 in (11.48 m)
- Depth of hold: 12 ft 5 in (3.78 m)
- Sail plan: Full-rigged ship
- Complement: 254
- Armament: Main Deck: 26 × 18-pounders; 8 × 24-pounder carronades; Forecastle: 2 × 6-pounders; 2 × 24-pounder carronades

Service record
- Commanders: Captain Sir John Gore (1801–1806); Captain the Hon. Duncombe Pleydell-Bouverie (1806–1813); Captain William Bowles (pro tem, 1808–1809, 1810); Captain George Bell (1813)
- Operations: Raids on Boulogne, 1801; Action of 5 October 1804; River Plate expedition, 1807

HMS Medusa was a 32-gun fifth-rate frigate of the Royal Navy that served in the Napoleonic Wars. Launched on 14 April 1801, she took part in the action of 5 October 1804 against a Spanish squadron, in the River Plate Expedition in 1807, and made several captures of enemy ships, before being converted to a hospital ship in 1813. She was broken up in 1816.

== Construction ==
Medusa was ordered on 28 January 1800 from the Pitcher yard at Northfleet, and was designed by Sir William Rule. Her keel was laid down in April 1800, and she was launched a year later on 14 April 1801. Medusa was commissioned on 25 April 1801 under the command of John Gore. One source suggests that Gore welcomed Nelson aboard on 30 July 1801.

== Service history ==
On 2 August 1801 Lord Nelson hoisted his flag aboard Medusa at Deal and crossed the channel in order to observe the French invasion fleet at Boulogne. He ordered an attack by bomb vessels on the 4th, followed by an attempt to board and cut out the enemy flotilla on the night of the 15th.

The British were organised into four boat divisions under the command of Captains Philip Somerville, Isaac Cotgrave, Robert Jones and Nelson's aide-de-camp Edward T. Parker, supported by howitzer boats commanded by Captain John Conn. The darkness of the night and a powerful tide meant that the boats arrived separately rather than together, and Jones' division missed the action completely. The French were well-prepared, and the attackers were met by heavy fire from the ships and from shore. Medusa suffered 55 casualties, the most of any ship.

During the Peace of Amiens, between October 1801 and February 1802, Medusa was employed in suppressing smuggling in the English Channel, patrolling the south coast between Start Point and the Isle of Wight. Gore learned of the imminent renewal of hostilities, so hurried to join the squadron of Sir Richard Bickerton in blockading the French naval base at Toulon. When Nelson arrived to take command in July, four sloops and four frigates, including Medusa, were sent to patrol off Gibraltar.

On 8 December 1803 Medusa attacked two French felucca-rigged privateers in the Strait. The first, Esperance, armed with two 12 and two 6-pounder guns, was captured, while the other, Sorcier, was pursued until she ran aground and was wrecked near Cabrita Point, 9 miles south-west of Marbella. Soon afterwards Medusa chased another French privateer schooner so close to Cádiz, that her shot went into the town.

On 9 January 1804 she captured the Spanish ship Nostra Senora del Rosario.

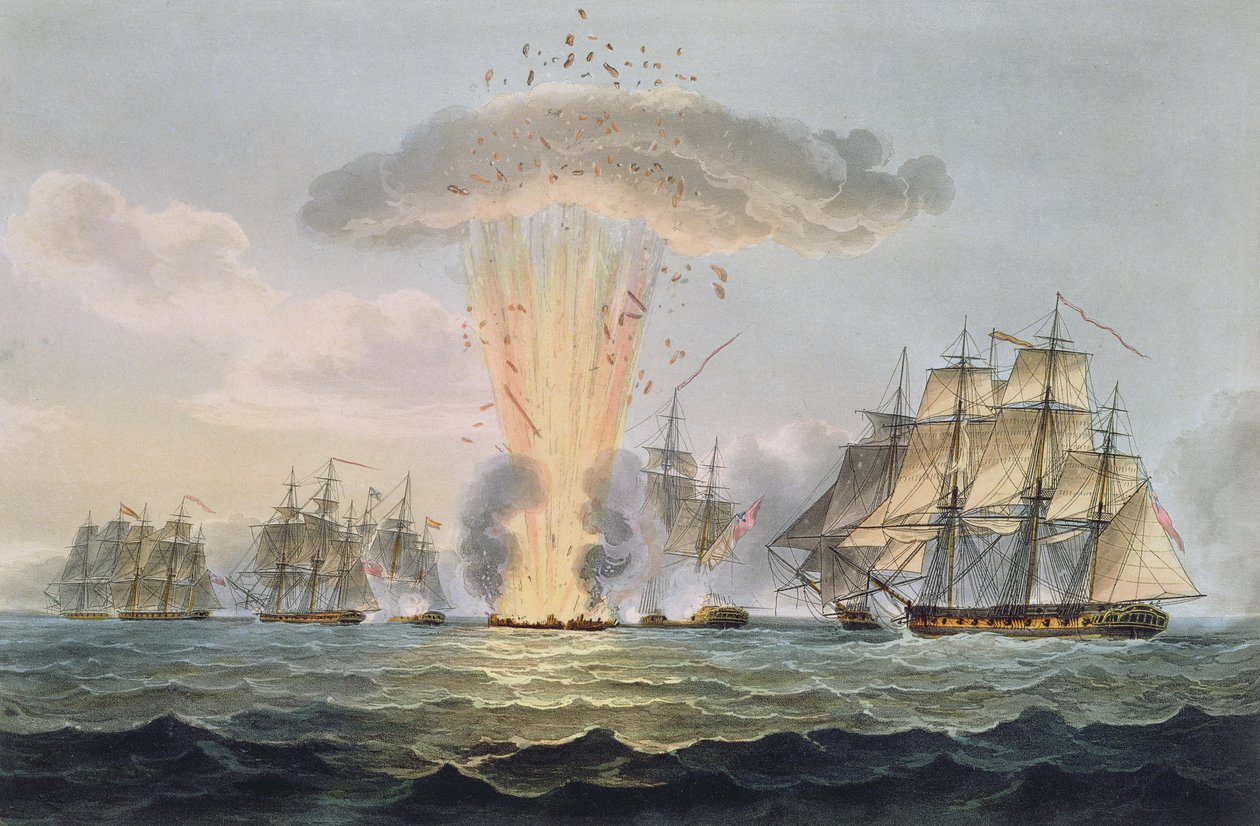
Sir Graham Moore's action of 5 October 1804. Medusa, Indefatigable, Amphion, and Liveley capture a Spanish squadron off Cádiz, and sink Nuestra Señora de las Mercedes

In the action of 5 October 1804 Medusa, along with the frigates Indefatigable, Amphion and Lively engaged four Spanish frigates en route to Cádiz with silver and gold from South America. Captain Graham Moore of Indefatigable made a perfunctory attempt to persuade the Spanish ships to allow themselves to be detained, which they naturally declined. In the short battle that followed the Spanish frigate Mercedes blew up, and the remaining three; Fama, Medea and Clara, were captured.

Medusa returned to Portsmouth on 8 November with the Spanish frigate Matilda, which she and Donegal under Captain Sir Richard Strachan had intercepted on 23 October, while sailing from Cádiz to Veracruz with £200,000 worth of mercury aboard. Medusa went into dock for extensive repairs. Gore was knighted in February 1805.

On 15 April 1805 Medusa sailed for Bengal with Lord Cornwallis, the new Governor-General of India, aboard as passenger. Unfortunately Cornwallis died soon after his arrival, so in November Medusa headed back to England, arriving on 26 January 1806, taking only 84 days to sail 13,800 miles. Gore was then given command of the 74-gun ship Revenge, and command of Medusa passed to Captain the Hon. Duncombe Pleydell-Bouverie.

During 1807 Medusa formed part of the expedition in the River Plate. In January she landed seamen and marines to support the army during the capture of Montevideo. In June an attempt to capture Buenos Aires failed, and Medusa helped to evacuate the troops.

In 1808 Medusa was attached to the Channel Fleet. On 4 April she captured the privateer lugger Actif of Dieppe, and relieved her of her prize, a coasting sloop. On 6 December 1808 Captain William Bowles was appointed acting-captain of Medusa, remaining in command until 23 April 1809 and Captain Bouverie's return.

In January 1810 Medusa captured two more prizes; the 14-gun French privateers Aventure and Hirondelle. Captain Bowles returned to acting command of Medusa in May 1810 while she served on the north coast of Spain, landing seamen and marines at Santoña in July to assist in the destruction of various French batteries.

From May 1812 Medusa was part of a squadron under the command of Captain George Collier in Surveillante, employed off the coast of northern Spain assisting the operations of Spanish partisans. On 17 June Medusa joined Hotspur, Rover, Venerable, Rhin and Lyra off Santoña, and made contact with the guerilla chief Don Gaspar, who arranged an attack on the town and the fort of Lequietio, 12 miles (19 km) to the east. Marines were landed to reinforce the guerillas, and Captain Bouverie supervised the landing of a gun, which made a breach in the fort's wall allowing it to be captured.

On 9 November 1812 Medusa captured the American schooner Independence, of 213 tons, 4 guns, and 23 men. She had been sailing from Bayonne, bound to New York, with a cargo of brandy, silks, etc. The Royal Navy took her into service as HMS Racer.

On 10 March 1813 Medusa captured the American vessel Messenger, and on 22 March the American vessel Tiger.

On 28 March 1813, Medusa captured Ferox and her cargo. Lyra was in company.

On 13 April Medusa captured the American letter of marque schooner Caroline, armed with 4 guns and with a crew of 28, en route to Bordeaux from New Orleans. On 10 June Bouverie left Medusa, and command was given to Captain George Bell, who remained until 17 November 1813 when she was decommissioned at Plymouth.

== Fate ==
Medusa was converted into a hospital ship, and was eventually broken up in 1816.
