= HMS Lively (1804) =

Frigate of the Royal Navy

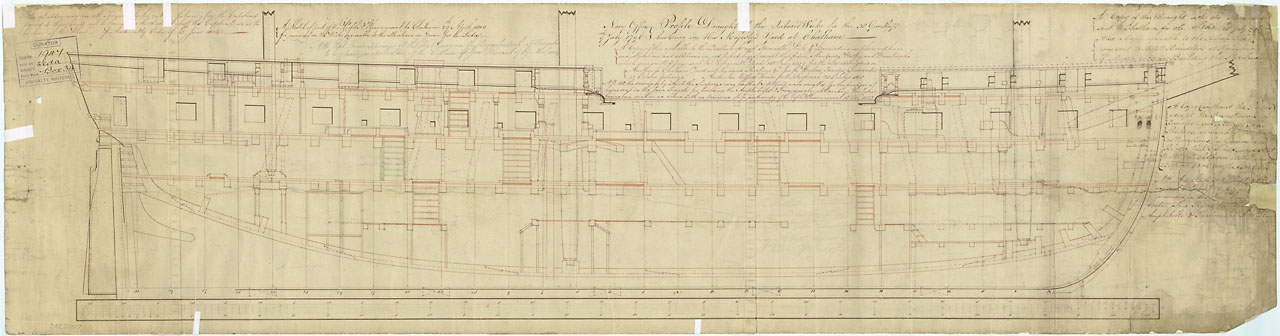
- Lively

History

United Kingdom
- Name: HMS Lively
- Ordered: 15 October 1799
- Builder: Woolwich Dockyard
- Laid down: November 1801
- Launched: 23 July 1804
- Commissioned: July 1804
- Fate: Wrecked, 20 August 1810

General characteristics
- Class & type: 38-gun Fifth rate frigate
- Tons burthen: 1075 90/94 (bm)
- Length: 154 ft 1 in (47.0 m) (gundeck)
- Beam: 39 ft 6 in (12.0 m)
- Depth of hold: 13 ft 6 in (4.1 m)
- Propulsion: Sails
- Sail plan: Full-rigged ship
- Complement: 284 officers and men (later 300)
- Armament: Upper deck: 28 × 18-pounder guns; QD: 2 × 9-pounder guns + 12 × 32-pounder carronades; Fc: 2 × 9-pounder guns + 2 × 32-pounder carronades

HMS Lively was a 38-gun fifth rate frigate of the Royal Navy, launched on 23 July 1804 at Woolwich Dockyard, and commissioned later that month. She was the prototype of the Lively class of 18-pounder frigates, designed by the Surveyor of the Navy, Sir William Rule. It was probably the most successful British frigate design of the Napoleonic Wars, to which fifteen more sister ships would be ordered between 1803 and 1812.

== Action of 5 October 1804 ==
In October 1804, Lively was under the command of Captain Graham Eden Hamond.

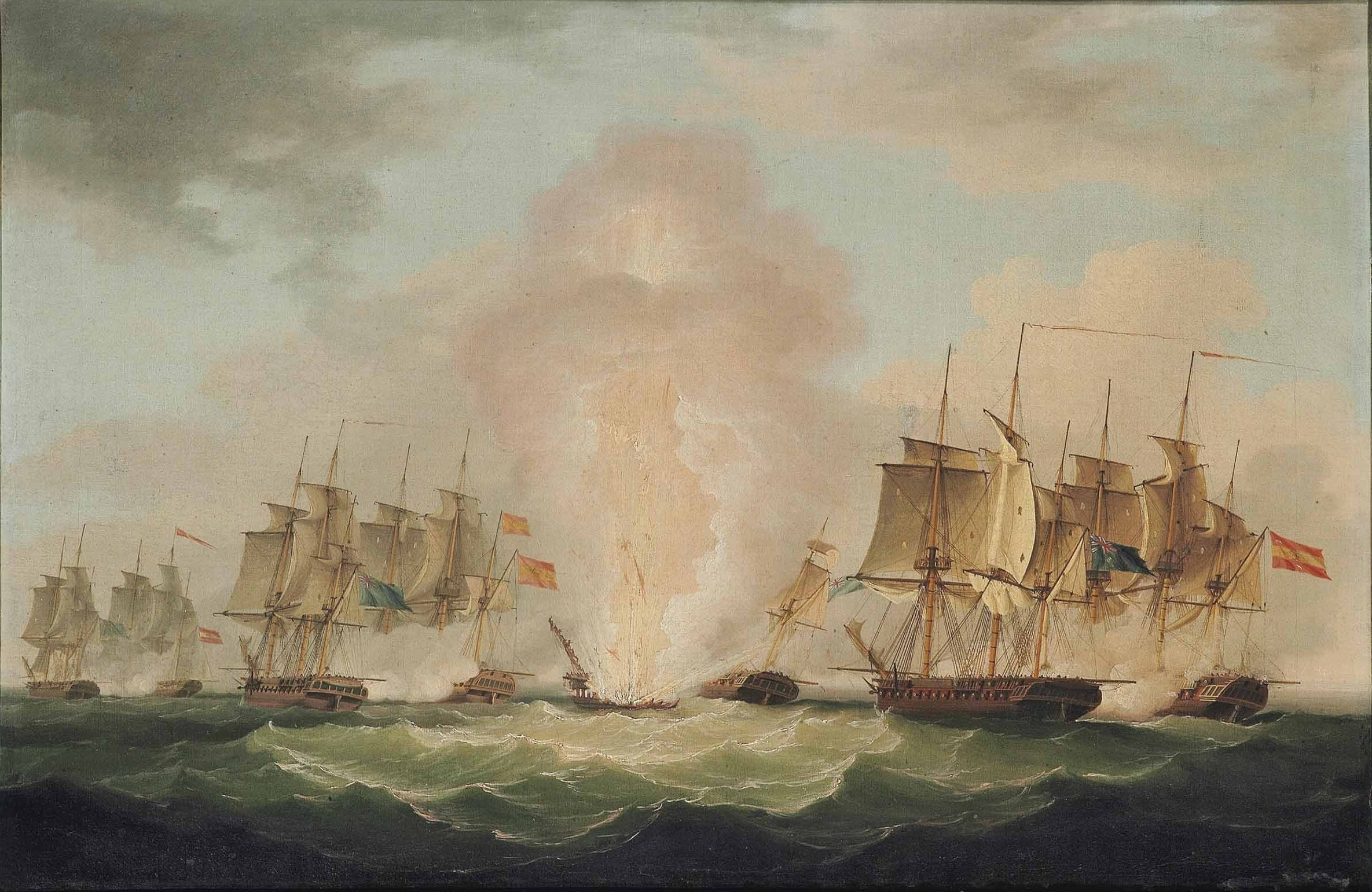
The blowing up of the Spanish Frigate Mercedes at the Battle of Cape Santa Maria, 1804, John Thomas Serres

On 5 October, a British squadron of four frigates, Lively, Medusa, Indefatigable and Amphion and, with Graham Moore as Commodore, Indefatigable, intercepted four Spanish frigates under the command of Rear-Admiral Don Joseph Bustamente, Knight of the Order of St. James, off Cadiz. As it transpired later, they were carrying bullion from Montevideo, South America to Spain. Spain was at the time a neutral country, but was showing strong signs of declaring war in alliance with Napoleonic France. Acting on Admiralty orders Moore required the Spaniards to change their course and sail for England. Admiral Bustamente refused and a short engagement ensued.

First, Mercedes blew up. Then Indefatigable captured Medée and Lively captured Clara. After a further chase, Lively and Medusa captured Fama.

- Medée, the flagship, was armed with forty-two 18-pounder guns, on the main deck, and had a crew of 300 men. She lost two men killed and 10 wounded.
- Fama, the Commodore's ship, was armed with thirty-six 12-pounder guns on the main deck, and had a crew of 180 men. She lost 11 killed and 50 wounded.
- Clara was armed with thirty-six 12-pounder guns on the main deck, and had a crew of 300 men. She lost seven killed and 20 wounded.
- Mercedes was armed with thirty-six 12-pounder guns, on the main deck, and had a crew of 280 men. After she exploded the British were only able to rescue her second captain and 40 men.

Indefatigable had no casualties. Amphion had five men wounded, one badly. Lively had two killed and four wounded. Indefatigable and Amphion escorted Medée and Fama to Plymouth. Medusa and Lively brought in Clara. The Royal Navy took Medea into service as Iphigenia and Clara as Leocadia.

The value of the treasure was very large, and if it had been treated as Prize of War then Moore and his brother captains would have become extremely wealthy. As it was the money (and ships) were declared to be "Droits of Admiralty" on the grounds that war had not been declared, and the captains and crew shared a relatively small ex gratia payment of £160,000 for the bullion, plus the proceeds of the sale of the hull and cargo. (Note: For a seaman, the amount was £19 9s 11d. This probably represented almost a year's wages.)

== Action of 7 December 1804 ==
On 7 December Lively and Polyphemus captured the Spanish frigate Santa Gertruyda off Cape St Mary. The Royal Navy took her into service as Santa Gertruda, but did not commission the 40-year-old ship. Instead it used her as a receiving ship at Plymouth.

In March 1805, Lively was attached to Sir James Craig's military expedition to Italy. Along with HMS Dragon, Craig's flagship, and HMS Ambuscade, Lively escorted the fleet of transports to Malta.

== Actions during Peninsular War ==
The inlets to Villa Garcia and Marin'. Surveyed by P W [Peter Wright] Gawthorp, Master of HMS Lively, by order of George M'Kinley, April 1809

During February 1809, five British warships patrolled the Galician coast: the frigates HMS Endymion (40 guns) and HMS Statira (38 guns) and the sloop-of-war HMS Plover (18 guns) operated off A Coruña and Finisterre, while the frigate HMS Lively (38 guns) and the schooner HMS Adonis (8 guns) operated in the Porto area.

During the first two weeks of March, crews from various British naval vessels unloaded muskets, gunpowder, and other supplies for insurgent forces in Marín, Pontevedra, Santiago, and Villagarcía.

On January 29, 1809, French forces under General Pierre Hugues Victoire Merle seized the Fort of San Fernando and the town of Marín.

On March 4, the "Morrazo" militia—led by Don Juan Antonio Gago de Mendoza and supported by the frigates HMS Statira and HMS Lively—assaulted and captured the Fort of San Fernando. British naval forces landed at Almuiña Beach while Spanish forces attacked from the heights; the French suffered 20 dead and numerous wounded, with 78 taken prisoner, including a commander and two officers. Despite this success, it appears Gago de Mendoza was dismissed by Morillo.

While anchored at Marín on March 8, cannon fire from Pontevedra could be heard in the town. On March 9, a French detachment of 80 infantrymen and 4 cavalrymen, led by three officers, entered Marín in an attempt to retake the town but was repelled by fire from the sloop-of-war HMS Plover (18 guns) and the frigate HMS Lively. The French withdrew that afternoon under artillery fire, while a local party captured two French officers—a captain and a lieutenant—and handed them over to Captain George McKinley of the Lively. McKinley left the sloop at Marín and departed for Villagarcía on March 11. At that time, McKinley stated in a dispatch to the Admiralty:

Admiralty-Ofiice, March 28, 1809

Extrac of a Letter from Captain Mc Kinley, of His Majesty Ship Livety Shiply, to the Hon. W.W. Pole dated Villa García March 15, 1809

...

On the 9th a Party of Eighty Infantry and Four Cavalry, under the Command of Three Officer from Pontevedra, entered Marin, but a Fire being opened on them from this Ship, and the Plover, and the Carronade from the Launch, they made a most precipitate Retreat; the Commanding Officer on a good Horse, and the Four Cavalry benefiting by their being mounted, left their Cormnpauions, who outrunning their Officers, a Captain and Lieutenant fell into the Hands of the Spaniards, who delivered them to me.

It is with the most heartfelt. Satisfaction, that I can with Confidence afford their Lordships that the Spirit of the Galicians is arounded to the most enthusiastic Ardour, governed by a cool determined Courage, which the Feelings of Loyalty and Patriotism naturally inspire, and they confidently look for Aid to the Generosity of the British Government speedily to succour them with Aims and Ammunition to enable them to succeed in the glorious and just Cause which they have undertaken, to expel the perfidious Invaders of their Country.

== Fate ==
On 20 August 1810, while escorting another convoy to Malta, HMS Lively ran aground on rocks near Point Coura, Malta, and was wrecked; there were no deaths. Workmen from the dockyard at Valletta attempted unsuccessfully to get her off. Work continued until late September when she was abandoned as a wreck after having been stripped of anything of use or value. The court martial dis-rated the master for having sailed too close to shore, and reprimanded the officer of the watch.

== In popular culture ==
Lively appears in Patrick O'Brian's novels Post Captain and HMS Surprise, with O'Brian's fictional naval officer, Jack Aubrey, in temporary command.
