= Ignacio María de Álava =

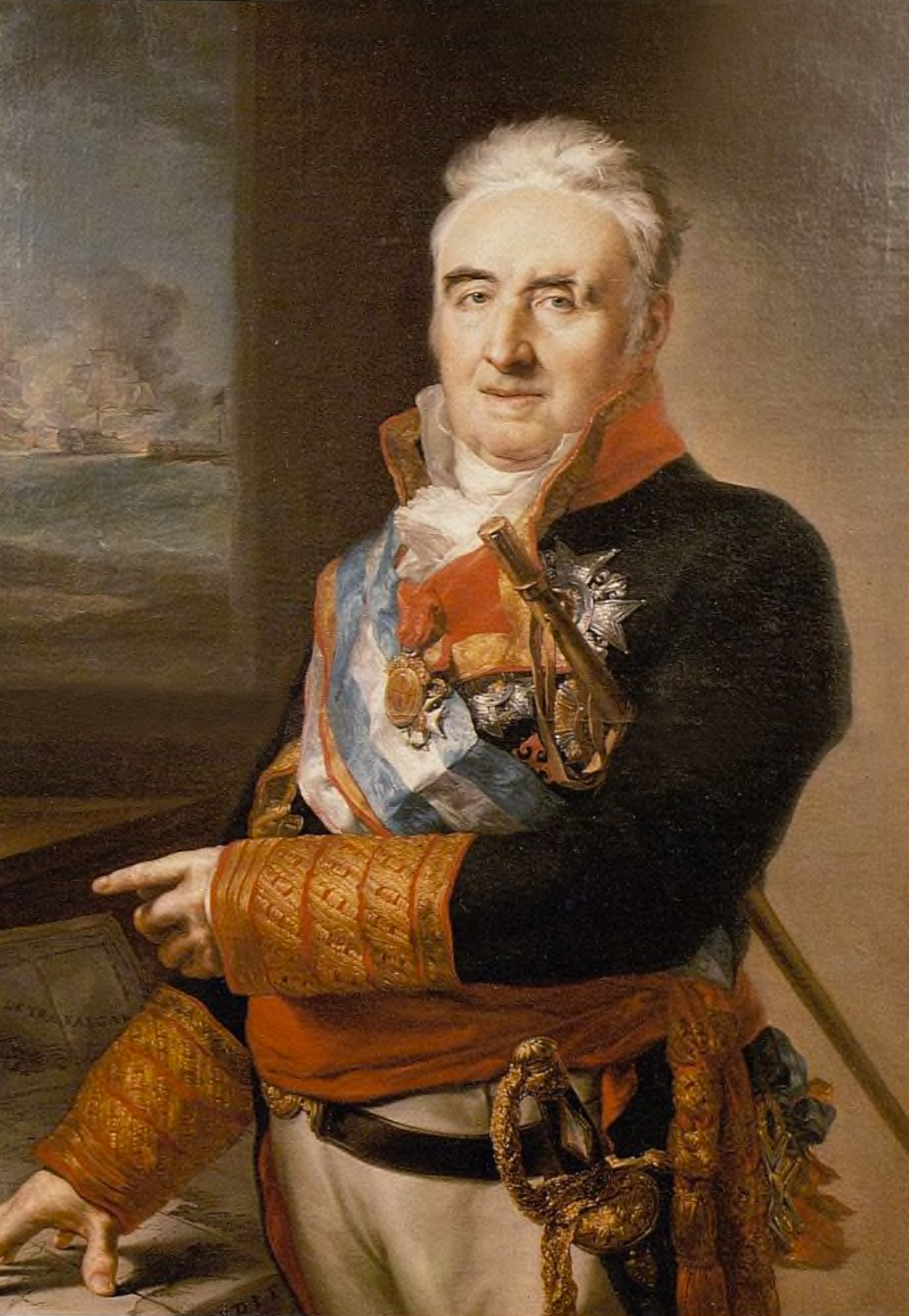
Portrait by Vicente López Portaña, c. 1816

Ignacio María de Álava y Sáenz de Navarrete (24 October 1750 – 26 May 1817) was a Spanish Navy officer who fought at the Battle of Trafalgar.

== Naval career ==
Álava joined the Spanish navy in 1766. In his early years, he was involved in fighting the pirates of the North African coast (whom the Spanish navy had been fighting for a long time). In 1781, he commanded the corvette San Luis, which took part in the Spanish blockade of Gibraltar during the American Revolutionary War. He took part in an attack on the floating batteries of Gibraltar, and was involved in the Battle of Cape Spartel on 20 October 1782. Shortly after, he was promoted to capitán de navío (naval captain), and was transferred to the frigate Sabina.

From 1787 to 1790, he was flag captain in the fleet of Admiral Don Juan de Lángara. In 1790, commanding the San Francisco de Paula, he brought relief to the city of Oran, which was besieged by Algerian pirates. In 1792 he was promoted to brigadier (Commodore), and given command of a squadron in Lángara's fleet. In 1793 and 1794, Álava took part in the campaigns in the Golfe du Lion, part of the French Revolutionary Wars. In 1795, Álava, who had been promoted to jefe de esquadra (rear admiral) the previous year, was given command of a naval squadron that sailed around the world in order to undertake several missions in the Spanish colonies, for example reorganizing the naval forces in the Philippines. While in the East Indies, he witnessed the British raid on Manila in 1798 and led the combined squadron at the inconclusive Macau Incident in 1799. He would not return to Cádiz until 1803. By then he was a teniente general (vice admiral).

On 15 February 1805, Álava was appointed second-in-command of the Spanish fleet in Cádiz, under Admiral Gravina. When Gravina joined the French Mediterranean fleet under Villeneuve for its voyage to the Caribbean, Álava remained as commander of the ships in Cádiz. On 20 August 1805 Gravina and Villeneuve returned, and Cádiz was blockaded by a Royal Navy fleet under Vice-Admiral Horatio Nelson. On 19 October, the combined French and Spanish fleet left Cádiz, with Álava on board of his flagship, the 112-gun Santa Ana. On 21 October, they met the British fleet and the Battle of Trafalgar ensued.

Alava was severely wounded in the battle, and the Santa Ana was captured by the British. However, two days later, a squadron jointly under the command of Commodore Cosmao-Kerjulien and Spanish Commodore Enrique MacDonell succeeded in recapturing her and getting her back to Cádiz. After Gravina died of the wounds he had received in the battle, Álava became the commander of the remaining ships in Cádiz. In May 1808, Álava defected to Sevilla, where a junta had formed to oppose the French. After Cádiz had been recaptured by the Spanish, Álava once again became commander of the naval squadron based there. In 1810, Álava became Commander-in-Chief in the Caribbean, based in Havana. He returned to Cádiz in 1813, as its governor. In 1814 he became a member of the Supreme Council of the Spanish Admiralty, and on 24 February 1817 he became Admiral of the Spanish Fleet. He died after only three months in this position.
