= José de Bustamante =

Spanish naval officer and explorer (1759–1825)

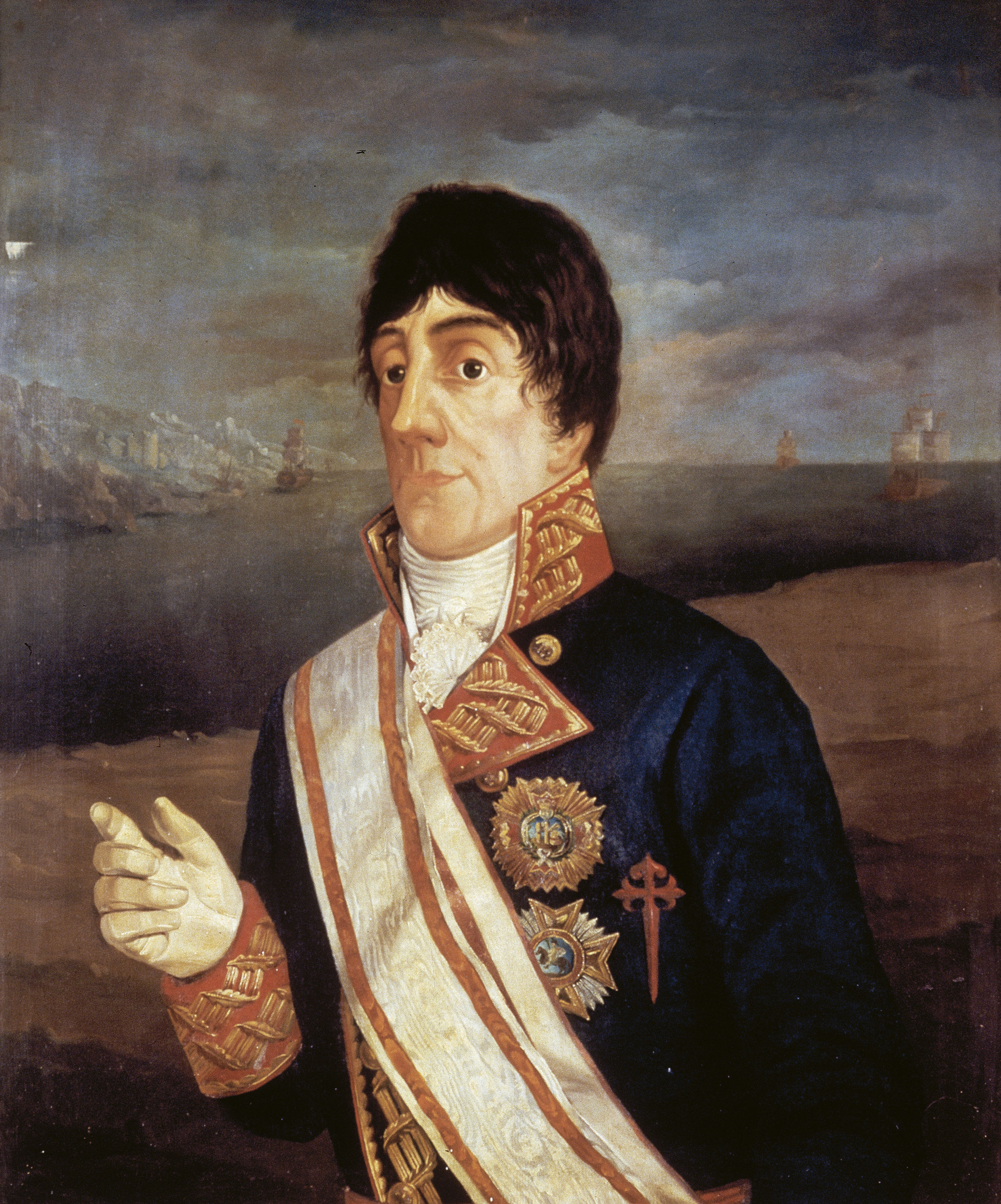
José de Bustamante y Guerra

José de Bustamante y Guerra (1 April 1759 – 10 March 1825) was a Spanish Navy officer, explorer and politician. He governed Guatemala as the captain general and president of the audiencia of Guatemala from 1811 to 1818. He governed Guatemala as a dictator and opposed the Cadiz Constitution of 1812.

== Early life ==
He descended from the Bustamante de Toranzo and the Guerra de Ibio; his father was Joaquín Antonio de Bustamante y Rueda, a native of Alceda, and his mother Clara Guerra de la Vega, a native of Santander. In 1770 Bustamante became a midshipman at the Academy of the Guardiamarinas in Cádiz, at the age of 11; He was already second lieutenant of frigate in June 1771. He served in several sea campaigns in the squadron under Pedro de Castejón. He fought in the Mediterranean Sea against Berber pirates, at the end of his studies there he embarked on the Santa Inés, bound for the Philippines. But the ship was attacked and captured by a British ship. Bustamante was eventually released and returned to Spain. On October 20, 1782, he took part in the battle of Cape Spartel, against the squadron of Lord Richard Howe, first Earl of Howe, although he was wounded. His ship was badly damaged in a battle fought near Cádiz. Bustamante then prepared a projected conquest of Jamaica, which was not carried out by the Peace of Paris in 1783. In 1784, with a brilliant service record, he became employed as a frigate captain, and entered as a knight of the Order of Santiago on October 21, 1784. At that time he planned with his comrade Alessandro Malaspina, one of the singular characters of his time, a scientific journey through the colonial world of Hispanic influence.

== Malaspina-Bustamante expedition ==
Expedition from July 30, 1789, to September 21, 1794.

In 1788 Bustamante partnered with Alejandro Malaspina. Together they proposed to the Spanish government a grand scientific expedition modeled after the voyages of James Cook. The project was approved and two corvettes were built specifically for the expedition. Bustamante was in command of the Atrevida (Audacious) while Malaspina commanded the Descubierta (Discovery). The names were chosen by Malaspina to honor James Cook's Discovery and Resolution. The expedition was under the "dual command" of both Malaspina and Bustamante.

Bustamante and Malaspina called it "Scientific and Political Travel around the World" although it was popularly known as "Expedition to the World", later it was officially renamed "Ultramarine Expedition started on July 30, 1789" because it could not be Complete the round the world by having to return to Spain at the beginning of the War of Roussillon against the First Republic of France. Today, however, it is known as Malaspina Expedition or also Malaspina-Bustamante Expedition. The Expedition had a select team composed of the best officers of the moment, who were joined by botanists, painters, doctors and other enlightened humanists.

From 1789 to 1794 Bustamante and Malaspina sailed Atlantic Ocean and throughout the Pacific Ocean, stopping at nearly all the Spanish colonies and exploring little known areas such as the Spanish America (Buenos Aires, Montevideo, Patagonia, Islas Malvinas/Falkland Islands, Chiloé island, Talcahuano, Valparaiso, Santiago de Chile, El Callao, Guayaquil, Nueva Granada, Acapulco, California) to Pacific Northwest northwest step or connection between the Pacific and Atlantic Oceans (Alaska), and Spanish Asia (Filipinas, Marshall and Marianas Islands), Macao on the coast of china, New Guinea, Celebes, Molucas and Tonga Islands, New Zealand, and Australia. The two ships sometimes separated to pursue different tasks. For example, when sailing from Talcahuano to Valparaíso (in present-day Chile), Bustamante kept to the coast, surveying and mapping, while Malaspina sailed to the Juan Fernández Islands. Between Valparaíso and Callao, Peru, Malaspina again investigated offshore islands while Bustamante continued charting the coast. The same happened in the Atlantic, when Bustamante reached 57º south latitude (near the South Pole), one of the reason why Uruguay, Argentina and Spain have rights over Antarctica.

Bustamante was rewarded with the rank of captain (1791) and was promoted to navy brigadier shortly after his 1794 return to Spain.

Bustamante kept a diary during the Malaspina expedition, which was published in 1868 in the official journal of the Directorate of Hydrography.

== Later life ==
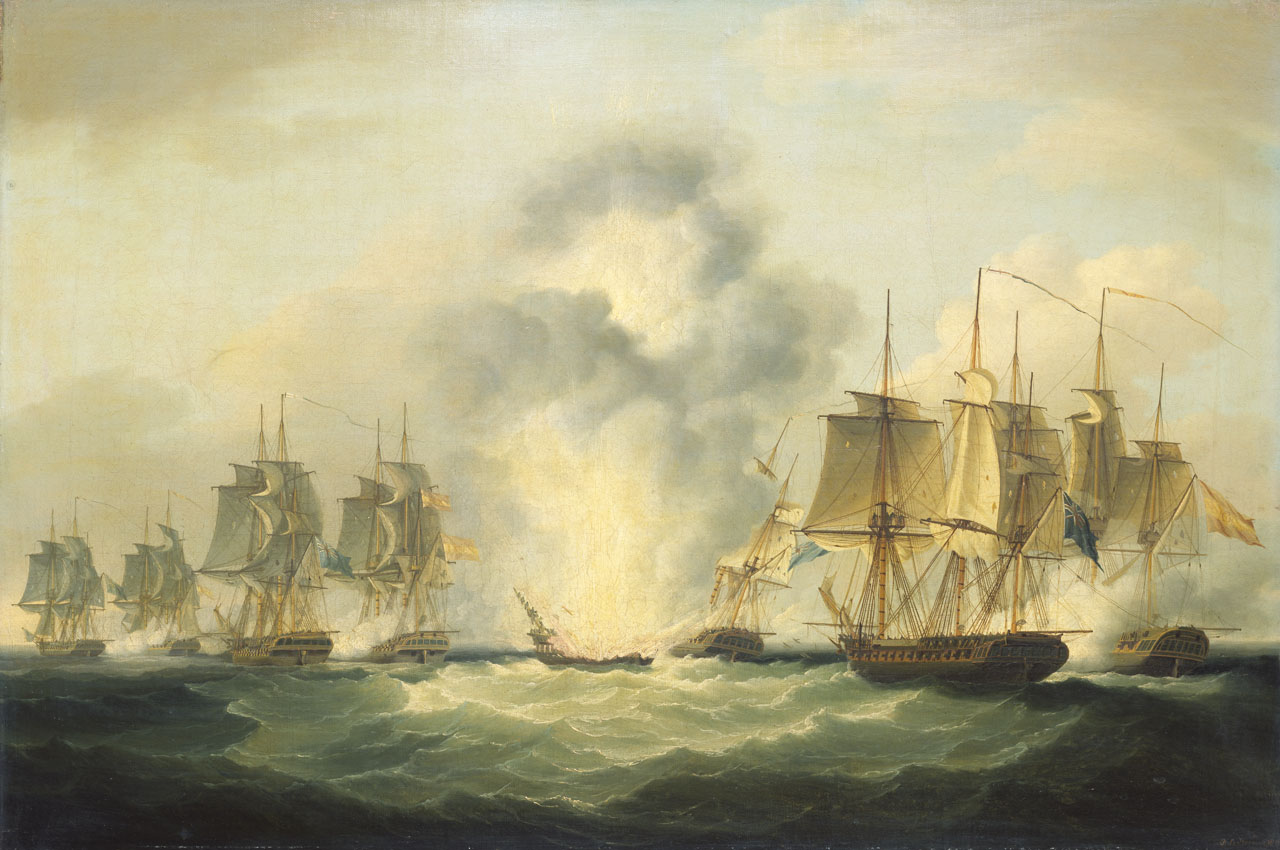
José de Bustamante y Guerra's flotilla intercepted by four British frigates on 5 October 1804. Painting by Francis Sartorius Jr.

After returning to Spain in 1794 Bustamante continued to work with Malaspina until the latter was imprisoned on charges of plotting against the state. Bustamante remained free of the political troubles of Malaspina. In 1796 he was appointed political and military governor of Paraguay and Commander-General of Río de la Plata (Governor of Montevideo). On October 5, 1804, while sailing to Spain in command of four frigates, Bustamante was attacked and captured by a British squadron after Guerra rejected Graham Moore's demand to sail his squadron to a British-controlled port for inspection. He was eventually released and faced a Spanish court-martial, but emerged untainted. On 14 December 1804 Spain declared war on Britain.

In 1810 he was appointed Captain General of Guatemala. He remained at that post until 1817. At a time of great independence activity; he develops a reformist policy of enlightened style, but before the revolution of Hidalgo and Morelos in Mexico he prepared troops in Guatemala and created the "Fernando VII volunteer corps" and from his position he confronted the insurgents by repressing them. Bustamante died in 1825 at the age of 66. In his will he donates a large amount of money to support the children's schools in Ontaneda, founded by Francisco, his brother.

== Commemoration ==
The Spanish Navy destroyer Bustamante was named for Bustamante. She was in commission from 1914 to 1931.
