= Spanish ship Montañés (1794) =

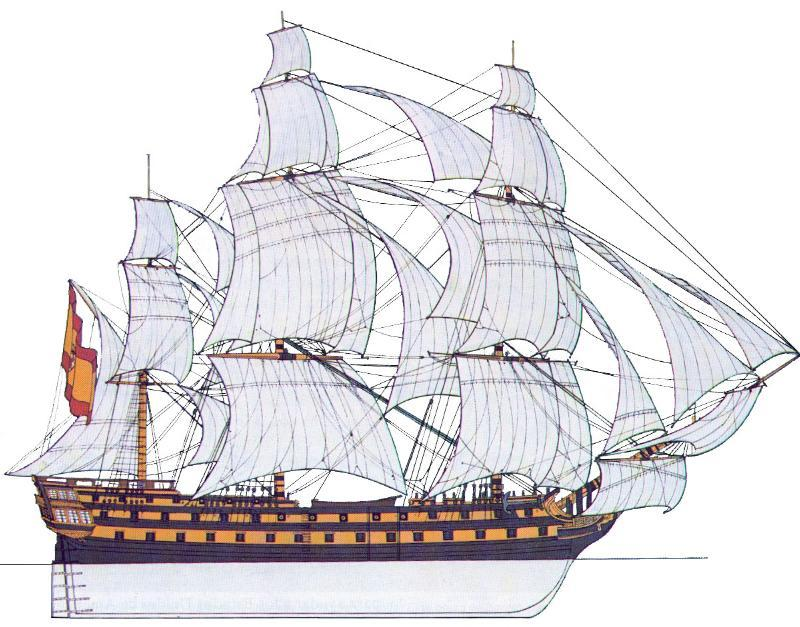
Illustration of a 74-gun Spanish ship of the line similar to Montañés

Montañés was a 74-gun Montañés-class ship of the line of the Spanish Navy. The lead ship of her ship class, she was built in the Ferrol shipyards and paid for by the people of Cantabria. Following José Romero y Fernández de Landa's system under which the San Ildefonso class had been built, a new design was prepared by his successor, Julián Martín de Retamosa, to refine her buoyancy. She was launched in May 1794 and entered service the following year. With 2,400 copper plates on her hull, she was much faster than other ships of the same era, reaching 14 (rather than the average 10) knots downwind and 10 (rather than 8) knots upwind. It had been intended that future 74-gun ships should be built to her design, but instead Retamosa produced a fresh design for a longer 80-gun ship, to which the following Neptuno and Argomauta would be built.

In 1795 she fought a French force of 8 ships of the line (including one three-decker) and 2 frigates single-handed in the bay of San Feliu de Guíxols - thanks to her superior speed, Montañés managed to get within range of a coastal artillery battery, forcing the French to break off the chase. In June 1805 she was put under the command of Captain Francisco de Alcedo and made part of Alcalá Galdiano's division, defending Cadiz from a possible British attack. At the Battle of Trafalgar she was assigned to the second division of Gravina's squadron. Both Alcedo and his deputy Antonio Castaños were killed (with the ship's command passing to Lieutenant Alejo Gutiérrez de Rubalcava), but overall the ship lost only 20 dead and 29 wounded. Montañés returned to Cadiz on the night of 21 October 1805. Now commanded by José Quevedo, on 14 July 1808 Montañés took part in the capture of the Rosily Squadron at Cadiz. She also made several voyages to the Canary Islands, Balearics and Havana before driven ashore in a heavy storm on 10 March 1810. Her wreck was salvaged and sold at public auction on 12 March 1822.

== Bibliography ==
- Adkin, Mark (2005). The Trafalgar Companion: A Guide to History's Most Famous Sea Battle and the Life of Admiral Lord Nelson. Aurum. ISBN 1-84513-018-9.
- Adkins, Roy (2004). Trafalgar: The Biography of a Battle. Little, Brown. ISBN 0-316-72511-0.
- Clayton, Tim & Craig, Phil (2004). Trafalgar: The Men, the Battle, the Storm. Hodder & Stoughton. ISBN 0-340-83026-3.
- Fremont-Barnes, Gregory (2005). Trafalgar 1805: Nelson's Crowning Victory. Campaign. Vol. 157. Osprey Publishing. ISBN 1-84176-892-8.
- Goodwin, Peter (2005). The Ships of Trafalgar: The British, French and Spanish Fleets October 1805. Naval Institute Press. ISBN 1-59114-824-3.
- Winfield, Rif; Tredrea, John M; García-Torralba Pérez, Enrique & Blasco Felip, Manuel (2023). Spanish Warships in the Age of Sail 1700—1860: Design, Construction, Careers and Fates. Seaforth Publishing. ISBN 978-1-5267-9078-1.
