= Sparshott =

Sparshott is an English family name, with variants Sparshatt, Spashett and Spershott.

== Origin and meaning ==
In the 12th century, two Anglo-Norman families, living in Hampshire, took the name of Sparsholt, a wood (and possibly settlement) close to Winchester. Sparsholt is a compound word, consisting of "spar" or perhaps "spear", and "holt", an area of woodland. Being within the reach of Portsmouth, it is possible that the wood was managed to provide material for ships' spars, or spears.

By the 18th century, the name of Sparshott had spread beyond Hampshire, primarily to Dorset and Sussex. The name is now found worldwide, although relatively uncommon. Although the name was always pronounced in the same way in Hampshire, by the 18th century its spelling had diversified, to Sparshott, Sparshatt, Spershott and Spashett; Sparshott being the most common spelling. This spelling variation follows the 16th-century spelling variations of the name of the village of Sparsholt.

== Notable people and characters ==
- Edith Sparshott, a character in the British TV drama series An Unsuitable Job for a Woman
- Edward Sparshott (1788–1873), British admiral of the Royal Navy
- Margaret Elwyn Sparshott (1870–1940), British matron
- Nigel Sparshott (1961–1998), British speedway rider
- Samuel Sparshott (1783–1851) British commander of the Royal Navy
- Thomas Henry Sparshott (1841–1927), British Anglican priest and missionary

== Notes ==
- The names Patchett and Spatchett are unrelated to "Sparshott", and do not belong in this category. They originate from Norman or other continental names, such as "Pasche", meaning the Passion of Jesus, and most early records of those names are from the vicinity of East Anglian ports.
