= Edward Sparshott =

Royal Navy Admiral (1788–1873)

Admiral Edward Sparshott KH
- Born: 3 March 1788; Portsea, Hampshire, England
- Died: 9 November 1873 (aged 85); Botley House, Botley, Hampshire
- Burial place: All Saints churchyard, Botley; 50°54′51.6″N 1°16′35.1″W
- Relatives: Samuel Sparshott
- Military career
- Service: Royal Navy
- Service years: 1801–1838
- Rank: Admiral (1866)
- Commands: HMS Prince Regent; HMS Rochfort; HMS Winchester
- Conflicts: Napoleonic Wars
- Awards: Royal Guelphic Order; Order of the Red Eagle

Signature
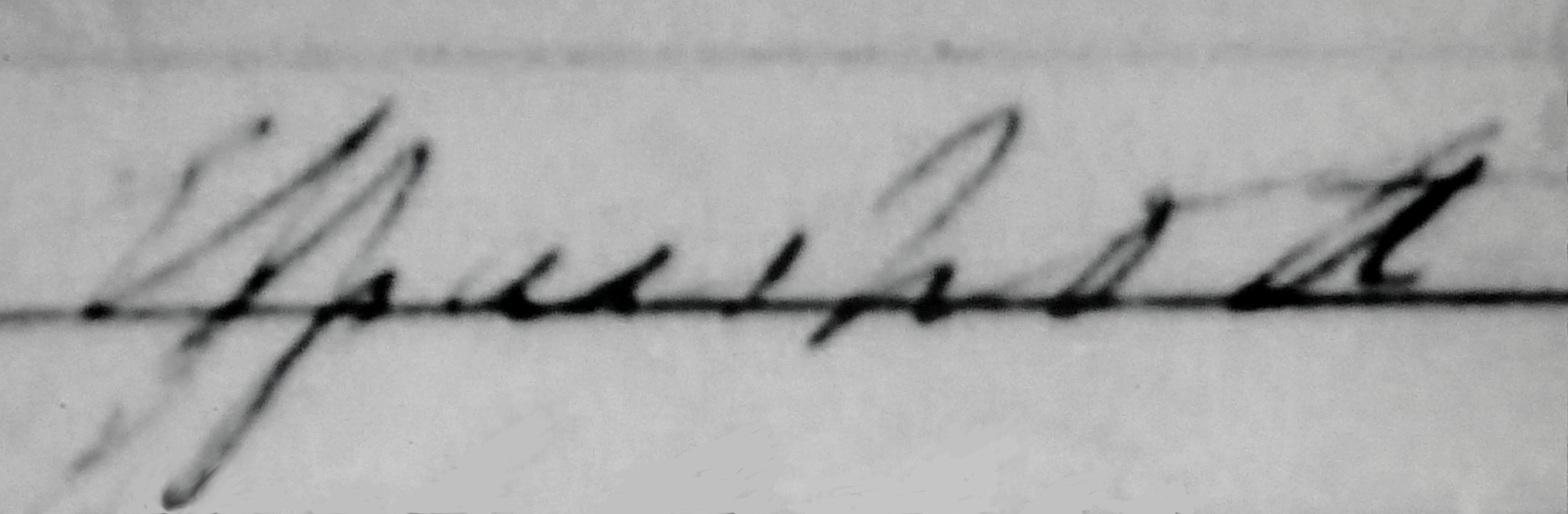

Admiral Edward Sparshott (3 March 1788 – 9 November 1873) was a Royal Navy officer who served in the Napoleonic Wars. As midshipman on HMS Centaur, flagship of Sir Samuel Hood, he was present at the surrender of Madeira. As captain, he commanded HMS Prince Regent, and HMS Winchester, flagships of Sir Henry Blackwood and Sir Thomas Bladen Capel, besides HMS Rochfort as post-captain under Charles Marsh Schomberg. He retired as captain, and ended his life with the rank of retired admiral.

Sparshott was descended from a Hampshire farming family, and was the youngest of eleven siblings. His brother was Commander Samuel Sparshott, R.N.

== Background ==
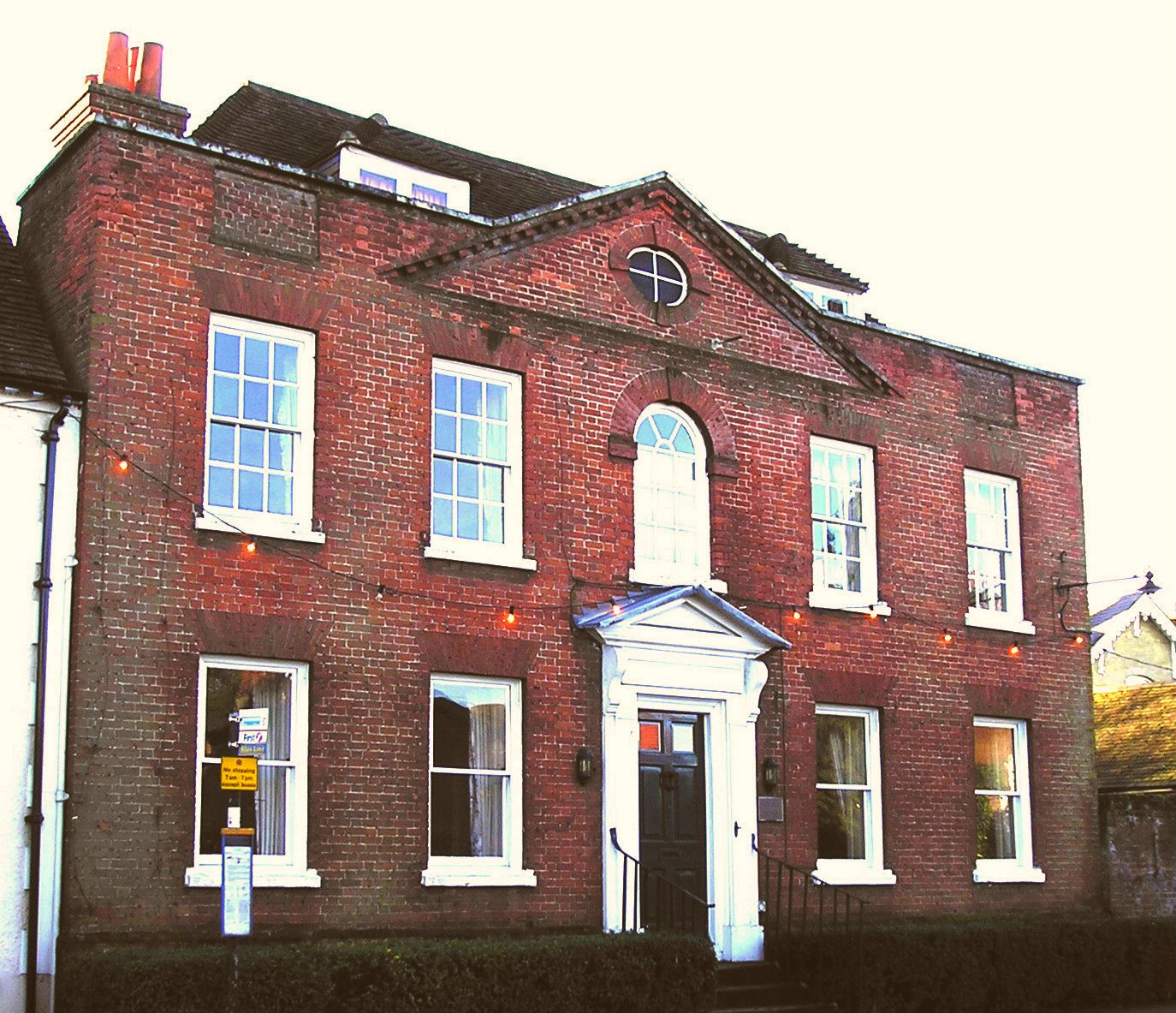
Botley House, Sparshott's last home

Sparshott came from a Hampshire family. His paternal grandparents were husbandman John Sparshott of Soberton, (Note: John Sparshott (Titchfield 1709 – Hamble March 1792)) and Elizabeth née Hall, (Note: Elizabeth Sparshott (Soberton 1710 – Portsea 1785) who married in 1730. His parents were Daniel Sparshott and Mary née Sparkman, who was illiterate. (Note: Daniel Sparshott (1750 – Portsea 15 January 1808). Daniel and Mary Sparshott's surname is spelled "Sparshett" in some records, as was their son Edward's surname in his baptism record.) They married in Hampshire on 29 November 1771, (Note: Mary Sparkman (Alton, Hampshire 25 September 1751 – Portsea, Portsmouth November 1821). From Winchester archive: Marriage certificate. "Daniel Sparshatt of this parish in the County of Southampton, and Mary Sparkman of the same parish, were married in this church by banns on this twenty-ninth day of November in the year one thousand seven hundred and seventy-one. The marriage was solemnised between us: Daniel Sparshat (signed); the mark X of Mary Sparkman".) and had eleven children, of which Edward was the youngest. (Note: The 11 children of Daniel and Mary Sparshott included 2 sets of twins: William (1772–1858), Thomas (1772–1835), John (b.1774), James (1777–1854), Daniel (1781-1845), Joseph (b.1781), Samuel (1783–1851), Elizabeth (1785–1847), Ann (1786–1867), Sarah (b.1790), Edward (1801–1873). James and Daniel were pursers of the Royal Navy.) Daniel Sparshott was later described as a gentleman. (Note: In 18th–19th century terms, a gentleman was a man living on his own means. It did not necessarily signify social rank or behaviour.)

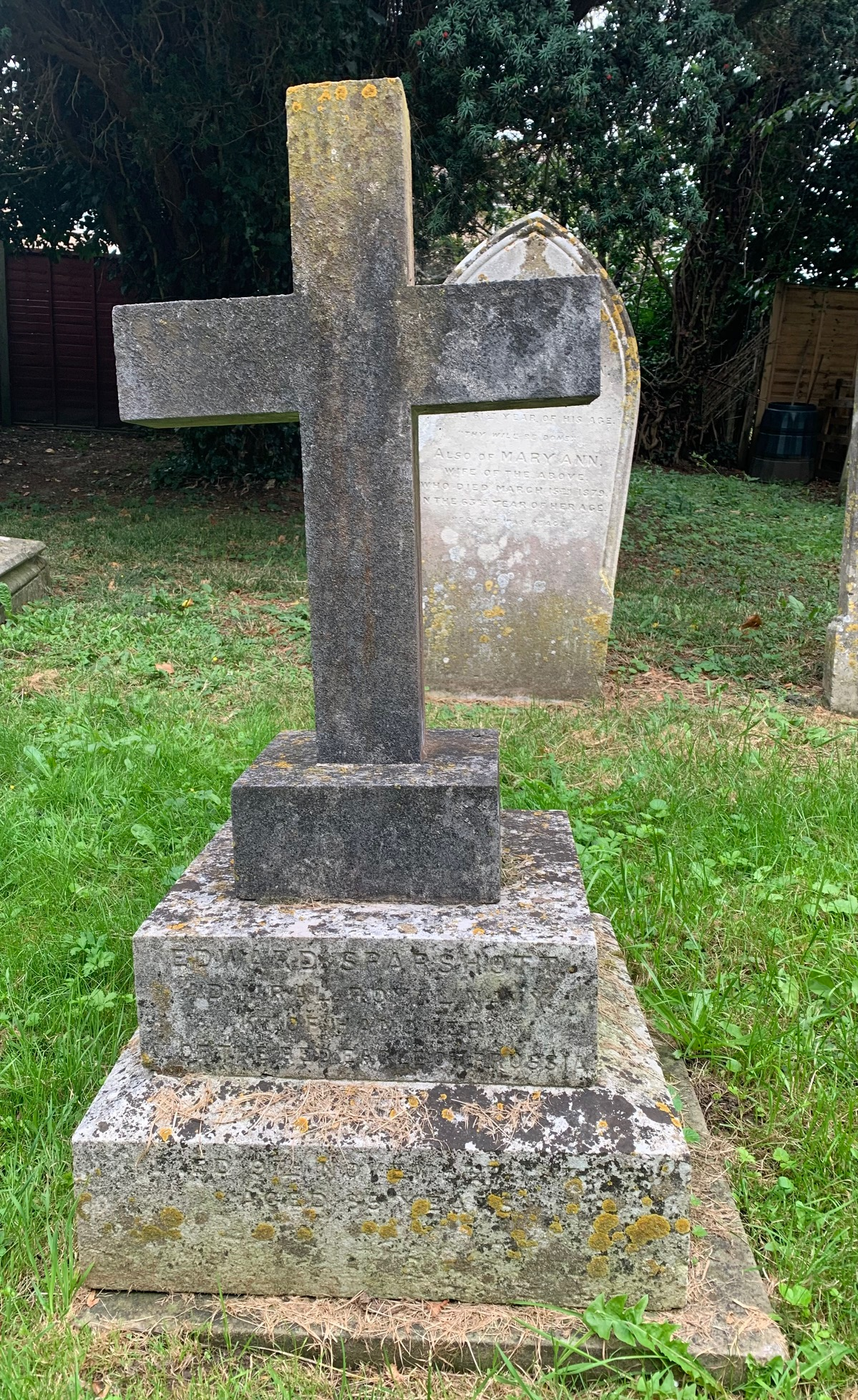
Sparshott's gravestone in Botley churchyard

Edward Sparshott was born in Kingsley, or Portsea on 3 March 1788, and baptised on 28 June 1801 at St Mary's Church, Portsea. His brother, the seventh of the eleven siblings, was Commander Samuel Sparshott, R.N. His brothers James and Daniel, fourth and fifth siblings respectively, were pursers in the Royal Navy.

At St Pancras Old Church on 16 August 1843, at the age of 45, Sparshott married Sarah Cooper, who was 20 or 25 years old, and literate. (Note: Sarah Sparshott (1818 or 1823 – 1903). GRO index: Marriages Sep 1843 Sparshott Edward and Sarah Cooper St Pancras 1 308. Deaths Mar 1903 Sparshott Sarah 85 Kingston 2a 261.) Their daughter Sarah was born on 5 December 1843. (Note: GRO index: Births Dec 1843 Sparshott Sarah Kensington III 260) Their son Adolphus Edward, a major of the Royal Marines, was born on 7 December 1845. (Note: Adolphus Edward Sparshott (7 December 1845 – 1936). GRO index: Births Mar 1846 Sparshott Adolphus Edward Kensington III 288. Deaths Sep 1936 Sparshott Adolphus E 90 Eastbourne 2b 121) Both children were born in Brompton, London. In 1851 he was living with his wife, two children and two servants in Clarence Cottage, Bridge Road, Marylebone, London, and describing himself as a retired captain R.N., with a "good service pension". Sparshott and his family were living in Botley House, High Street, Botley, Hampshire, from at least 1855 until at least 1873. The 1861 census finds the family living in the High Street, Botley, with Sparshott describing himself as a retired rear-admiral, R.N. In 1871 the family was at the same address, and their daughter Sarah, still unmarried, had remained at home. Sparshott was by then describing himself as "Admiral R.N., Retired List".

Sparshott died on 9 November 1873 at Botley House, 25 High Street, Botley, Hampshire, (Note: Deaths Dec 1873 Sparshott Edward 85 S. Stoneham 2c 35. Botley House was rented by Sparshott from the Guillaume family, who owned the building between 1782 and 1936 (see Historic Botley).) which is now a listed building. His death was noted in various places, including Bombay, Hampshire, and London. His will was proved at Winchester on 7 January 1874. He was buried in, or close to, the narthex of All Saints Church, Botley, Hampshire. In 2006, the narthex was demolished, and a two-storey extension with kitchen and toilets built in its place. Headstones and monuments were "relocated", and the planning application noted that "graves may be rendered inaccessible". (Note: Deaths Dec 1873 Sparshott Edward 85 S. Stoneham 2c 35. The gravestone of Edward Sparshott, All Saints Churchyard, Botley, Hampshire is a plain stone cross on a stepped base.The inscription says: "Edward Sparshott / Admiral Royal Navy / (...?) a kt of Hanover / kt of the Red Eagle of Prussia / Died 9th November 1873 / aged 68 years".)

== Career ==
=== Midshipman, 1801–1808 ===
Sparshott joined the Royal Navy as midshipman on 23 July 1801, at thirteen years of age. He was appointed to the sloop HMS Beaver of 18 guns under Captain Charles Bassett Jones, initially "on a convoy for Cork with Lord Gardner". Beaver was employed on the north coast of Ireland until September 1802. Between January 1803 and March 1805 he served in the cutter HMS Pigmy of 14 guns, at Guernsey under lieutenant commanders Samuel Burgess and Martin White. From March 1805 until December 1807, he was appointed to the sloop HMS Hazard, of 16 guns, under Captain R. J. Neve, and HMS Niobe, of 40 guns, under Captain John Wentworth Loring and Captain Matthew Wentworth Scott. "While cruizing with Captain Loring off L'Orient he assisted the capture, 28 March 1806, of Le Néarque corvette of 16 guns and 97 men, in company at the time with three French frigates". He served from 1807 to 1808 in HMS Centaur, of 74 guns, under the flag of Sir Samuel Hood. While in Centaur, Sparshott was "present at the surrender of Madeira" on 24 December 1807.

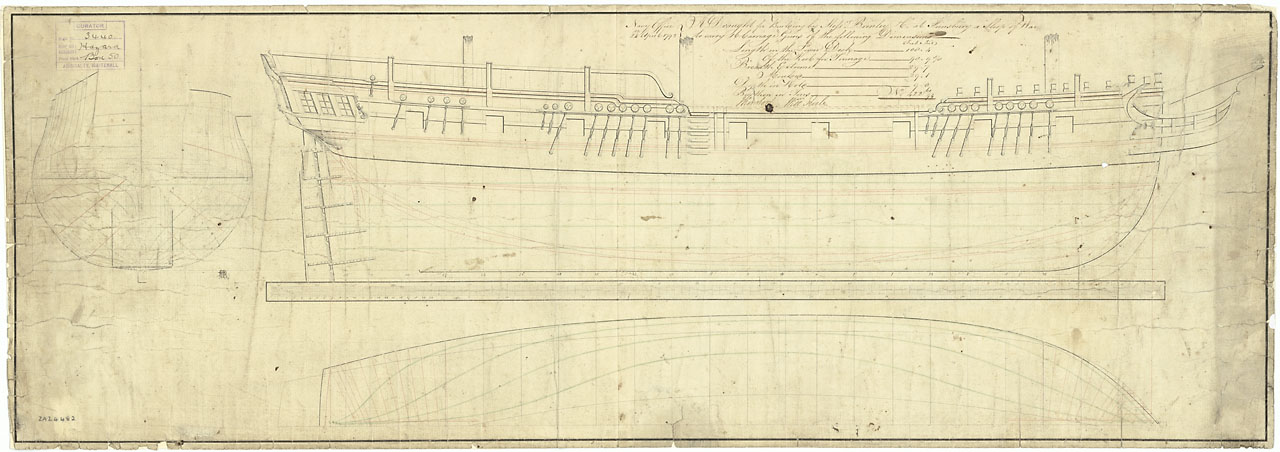
HMS Hazard (built1794)

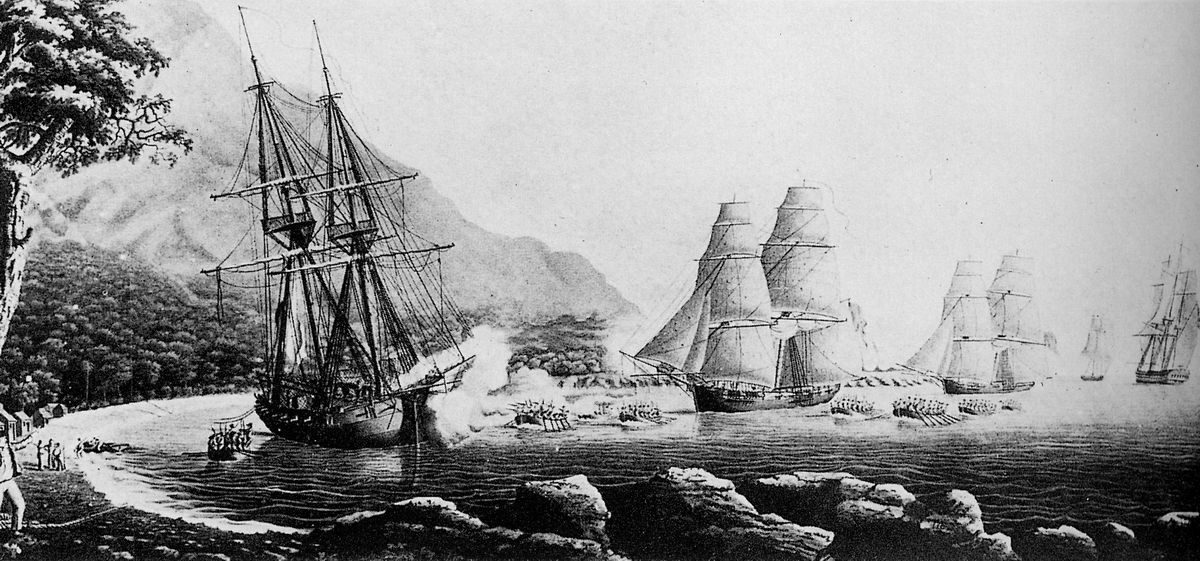
French brig Néarque (b.1804)

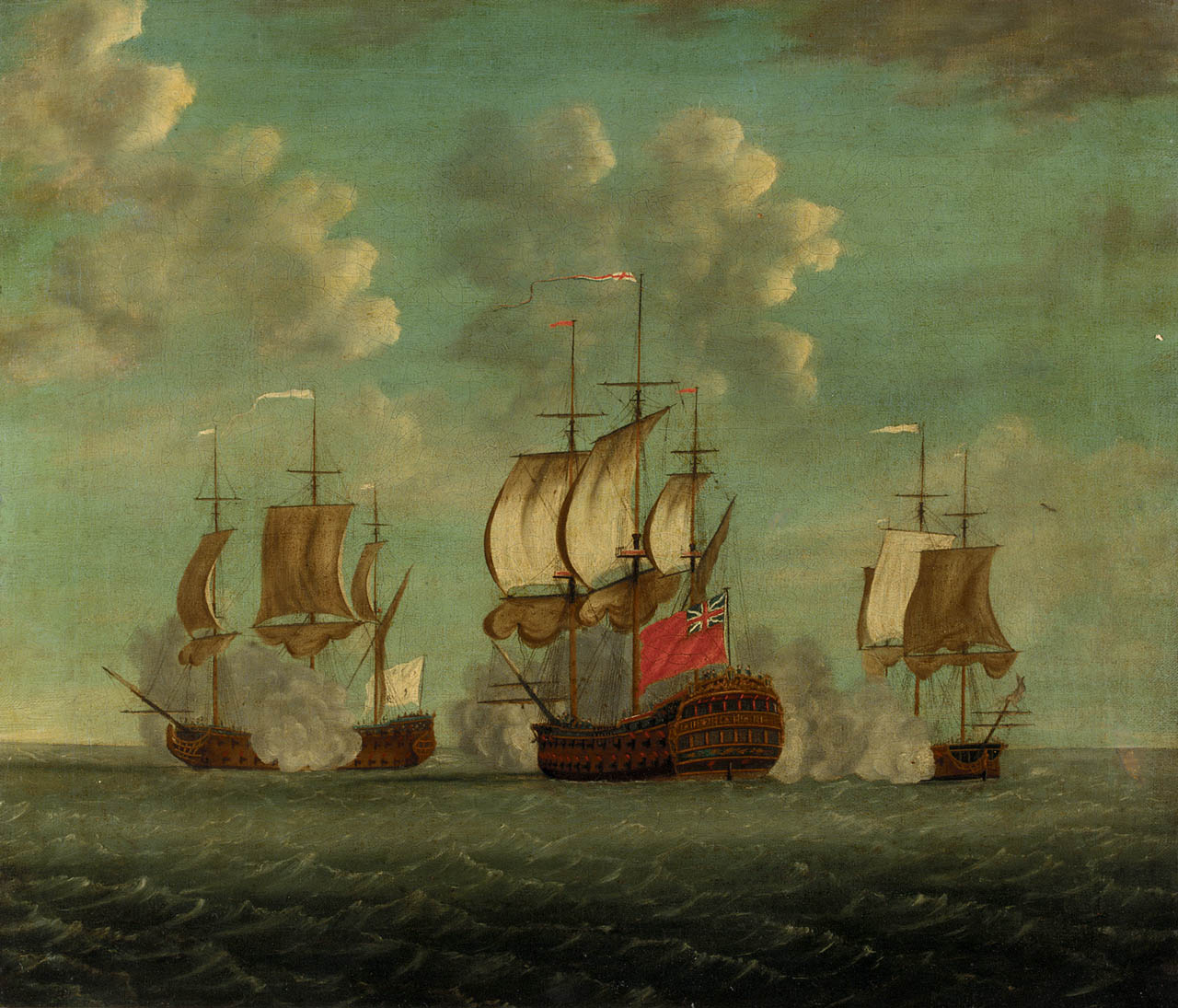
HMS Centaur (b.1759), centre

=== Lieutenant, 1808–1821 ===
Sparshott passed his lieutenant examination on 2 March 1808. On 16 July 1808, in the Baltic Sea as acting-lieutenant, he was given command of the prize-cutter HMS Baltic, of 14 guns. He "was signal mate of Lord Gambier’s flag-ship, the Caledonia 120, during the operations against the French squadron in Aix Roads, in April 1809". On 28 April 1809, he was formally promoted to lieutenant, "for his zeal and activity in [HMS Baltic] in effecting the capture of as many as 21 sail of merchantmen". From 12 May 1809 he served in HMS Niobe for "the rest of the war", under Captain William Augustus Montagu and Captain Loring, working at Cádiz, Lisbon and the Home Station. In 1810, as lieutenant of Niobe, he was involved in the "attack on two [French] frigates under the batteries of La Hogue", and in 1811 was involved in the "destruction of Amazone off Cape Barfleur". From 8 July, or 8 August, 1814 he served as 1st lieutenant in HMS Forester, of 18 guns, around Newfoundland under Captain William Hendry. On 15 June 1815 he embarked as 2nd lieutenant for England in HMS Warrior, of 74 guns, captained by John Tremayne Rodd.

Sparshott was next employed in the Mediterranean, as 1st lieutenant in HMS Myrmidon, of 20 guns, under Captain Robert Gambier from 15 October 1815, and HMS Tagus, of 38 guns, under Captain James Whitley Deans Dundas from 28 October, or 28 December, 1816. Still employed in the Mediterranean, on 26 August 1818 he was appointed as first lieutenant to HMS Rochfort, of 80 guns, under the flags of Sir Graham Moore and Sir Thomas Fraser Fremantle. He was fitting out Rochfort as the flagship of Fremantle, who was commander-in-chief on the Mediterranean station. On 11 January 1820 he was appointed to HMS Révolutionnaire, of 46 guns, under Captain Fleetwood Broughton Reynolds Pellew. Continuing to work in the Mediterranean, he was serving again in Rochfort from 15 April 1820 until promoted to commander. During his time in the Mediterranean, he was involved in several exploits:

[Sparshott] assisted in the Niobe at the capture, 20 Oct. 1810, of L’Hirondelle privateer of 4 guns and 30 men; took part, in the following Nov., in a gallant attack made, in company with the Diana 38, upon the French 40-gun frigates Amazone and Eliza, who were driven under the batteries of La Hogue, where the latter was ultimately burnt; aided in taking, 4 March 1811, Le Loup Marin privateer of 16 guns and 64 men; and witnessed, at the close of the same month, the self-destruction, near Cape Barfleur, of the above-named Amazone. While serving as Second-Lieutenant in the Warrior he experienced a furious hurricane, which dismasted that ship, filled her hold with 11 feet water, and nearly sunk her. In endeavouring on the occasion to clear her of one of a convoy which had run on board of her, he was washed into the sea; but his exertions nevertheless materially contributed to extricate her from her critical situation. As First-Lieutenant of the Forester, Myrmidon, Tagus, and Rochfort, Mr. Sparshott acquired much professional reputation and succeeded by his eminent good qualities in securing the friendship and esteem of his superiors.

On the Rochfort, at anchor in the Bay of Naples, Lt Sparshott encouraged his men to furl sails faster than the crew of HMS Révolutionnaire, and the Rochfort crew won. Immediately afterwards, Sparshott called up the ship's prisoners to the quarter-deck. Bechervaise (1847) describes what happened next:

Mr S. addressed them as follows. "Now gentry, there are some of you before me who deserve as good a flogging as ever was given in the navy, but I'll whitewash you all." Observing that one of the prisoners was about to thank him, he said, "Don't thank me sir, thank your shipmates for having done your work and their own smartly and well;" then taking the list from the master-at-arms, he tore it to pieces, and pitched the fragments through the port.

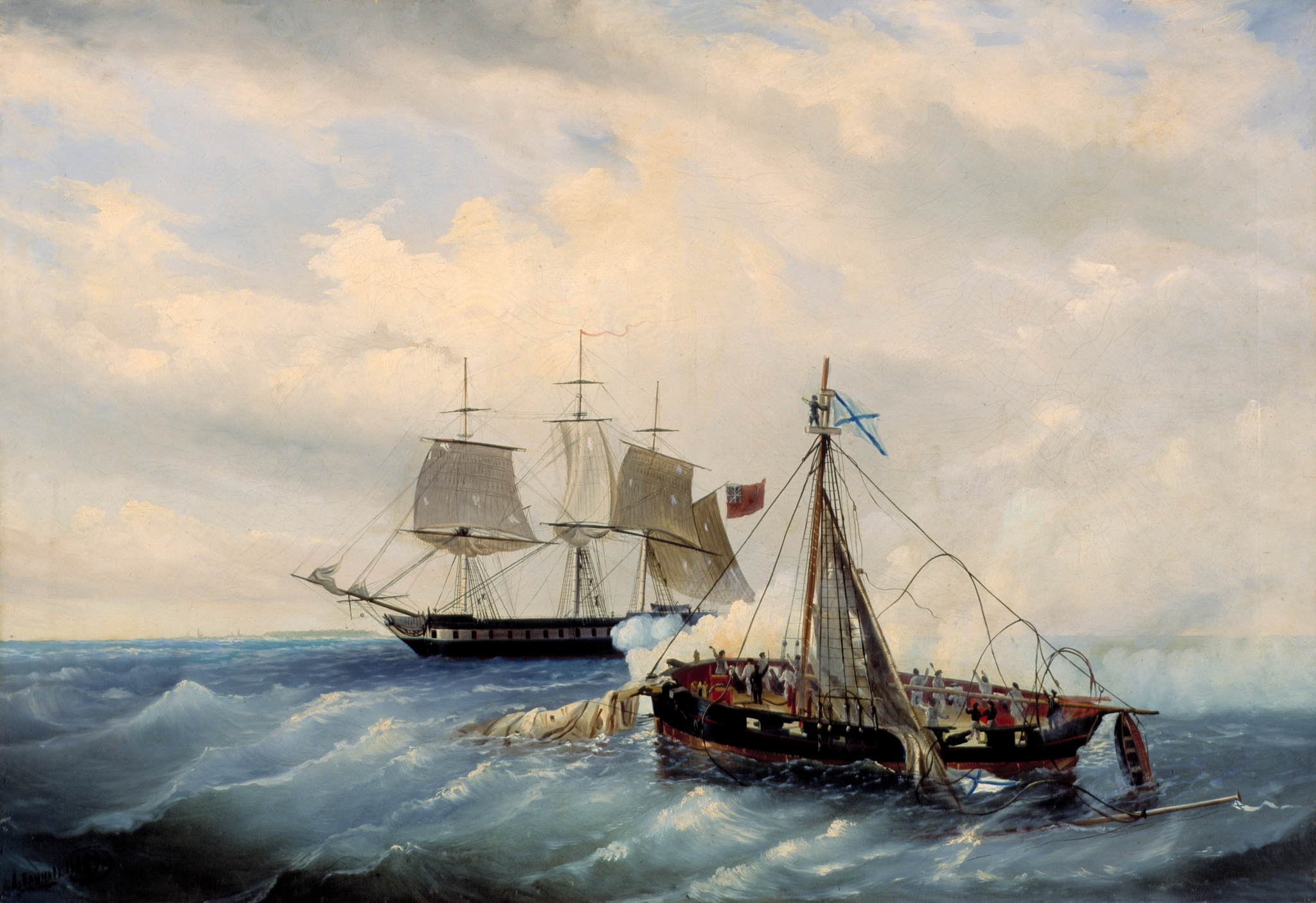
HMS Baltic, or Opyt, built 1806, in foreground

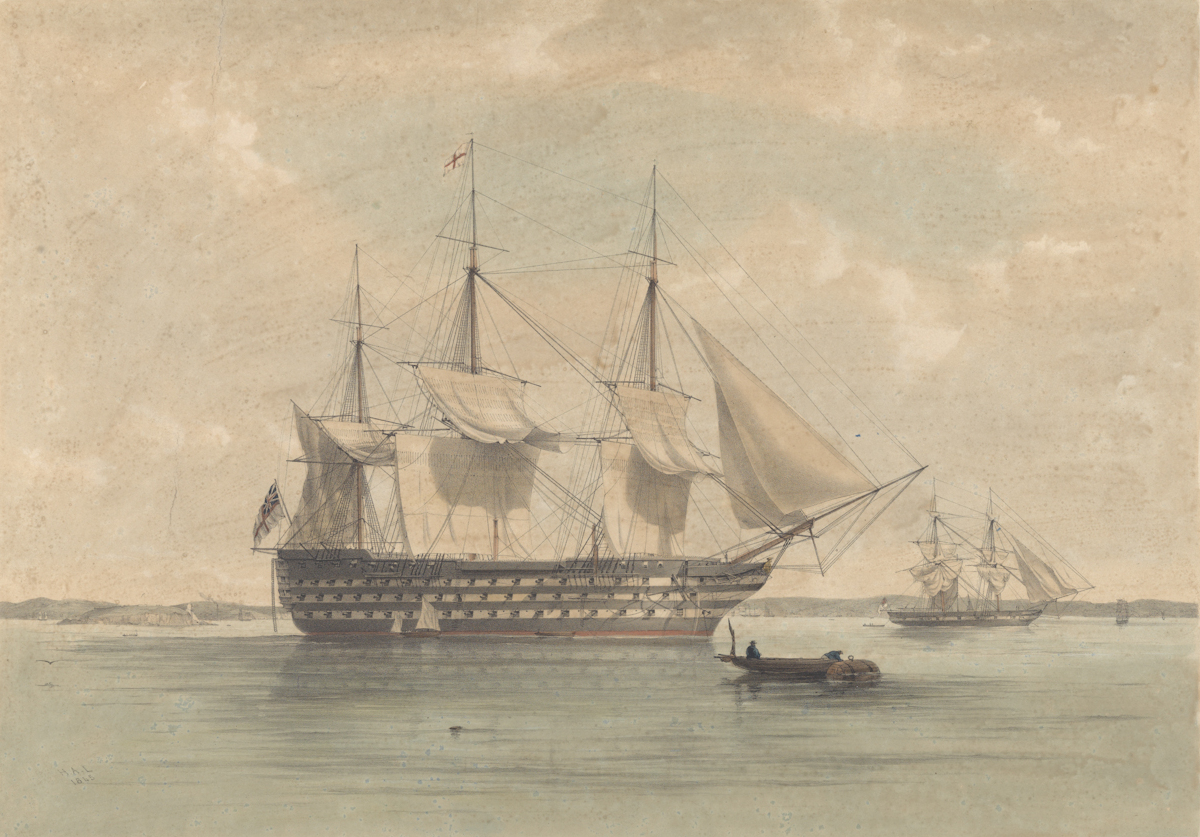
HMS Caledonia (b.1808)

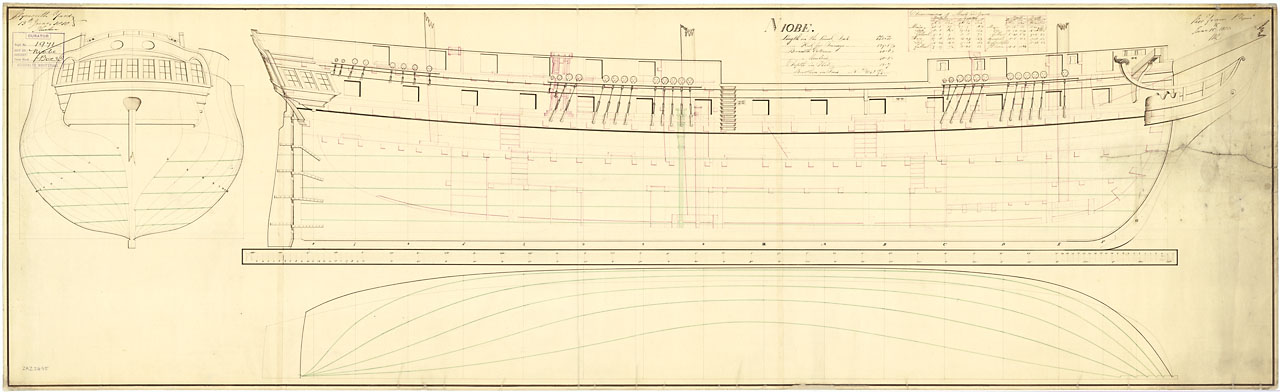
HMS Niobe (b.1800)

HMS Warrior (b.1781)

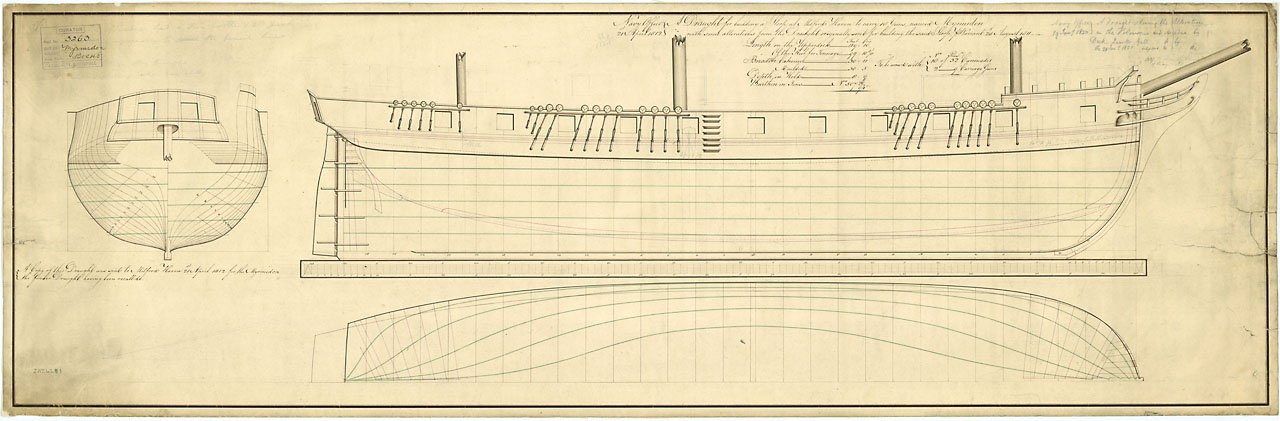
HMS Myrmidon (b.1813)

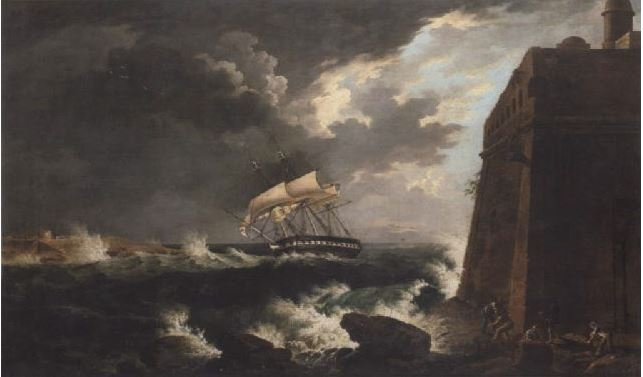
HMS Tagus (b.1813)

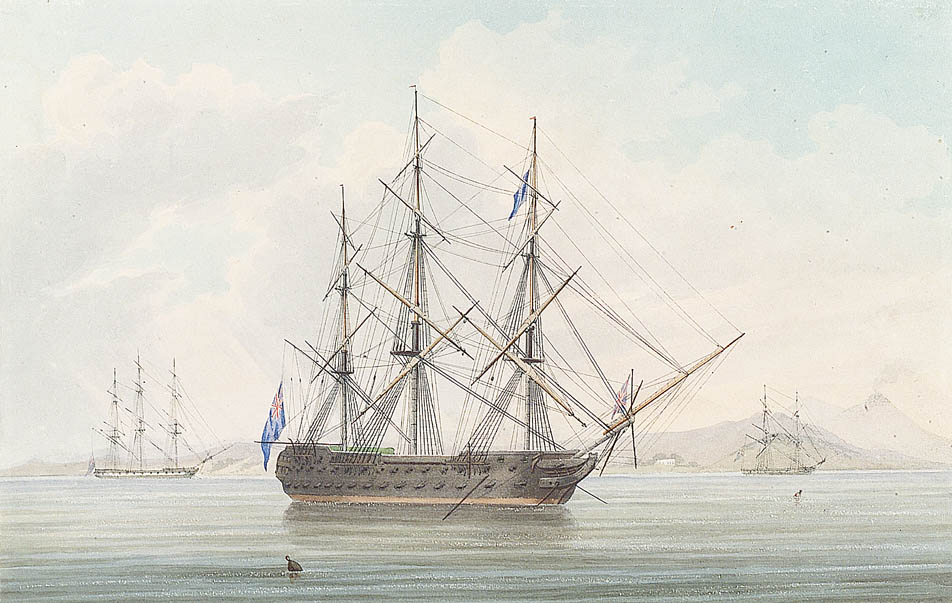
HMS Rochfort (b.1814)

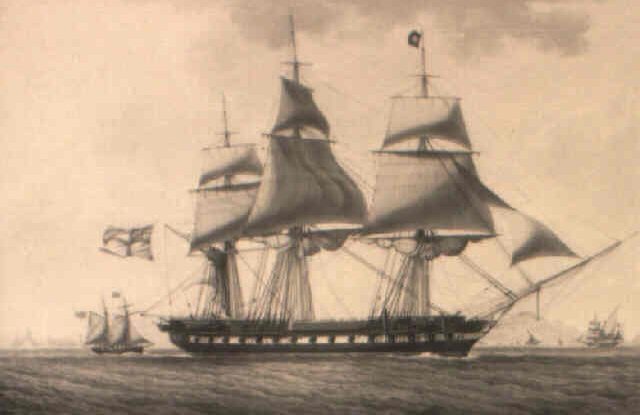
HMS Révolutionnaire (b. 1794)

=== Commander, 1821–1828 ===
Sparshott was promoted to commander on 29 January 1821. On 15 April 1821, he was appointed to Rochfort as 1st lieutenant. In 1824 he was appointed to the Coast Guard.

=== Second captain and captain, 1828–1838 ===
From 28 August 1828 until his name was posted as captain in The London Gazette and the Navy List on 22 July 1830, he was appointed second captain of HMS Prince Regent, of 120 guns, under the flag of Sir Henry Blackwood, based on the River Medway near Chatham Dockyard.

As a captain, Sparshott was described in the memoirs of a former crew member, thus:

[At some date between 1828 and 1832, in the 74-gun HMS Rochfort, under Captain C.M. Schomberg, Lt Sparshott] now an old post-captain, [was] as strict a disciplinarian, and as smart an officer, as could well be met with. Ships of war had not, in those days, arrived at that flying method of performing their various evolutions to which they have now attained; but the Rochfort's ship's company were smart in all their motions. Indeed, with Mr. S., they must be so; for although every order was rigorously enforced, it was done without a shadow of tyranny.

Following a recommendation from William IV, from 4 June 1834 until June 1838 Sparshott was in command as flag captain of HMS Winchester, of 52 guns, in the East Indies, Chatham, and Portsmouth under Sir Thomas Bladen Capel. As captain of Winchester, he "rendered important services in quelling an insurrection on the coast of Malabar in 1837". Byrne (1849) says:

In 1837 [Sparshott] was sent with a body of troops and two steamers and a corvette of the Indian Navy under his orders, to suppress an insurrection in the province of Canara; and so prompt and successful were his arrangements that he received the written thanks of the Governors in Council of Madras and Bombay, and the fullest approbation of his Commander-in-Chief.

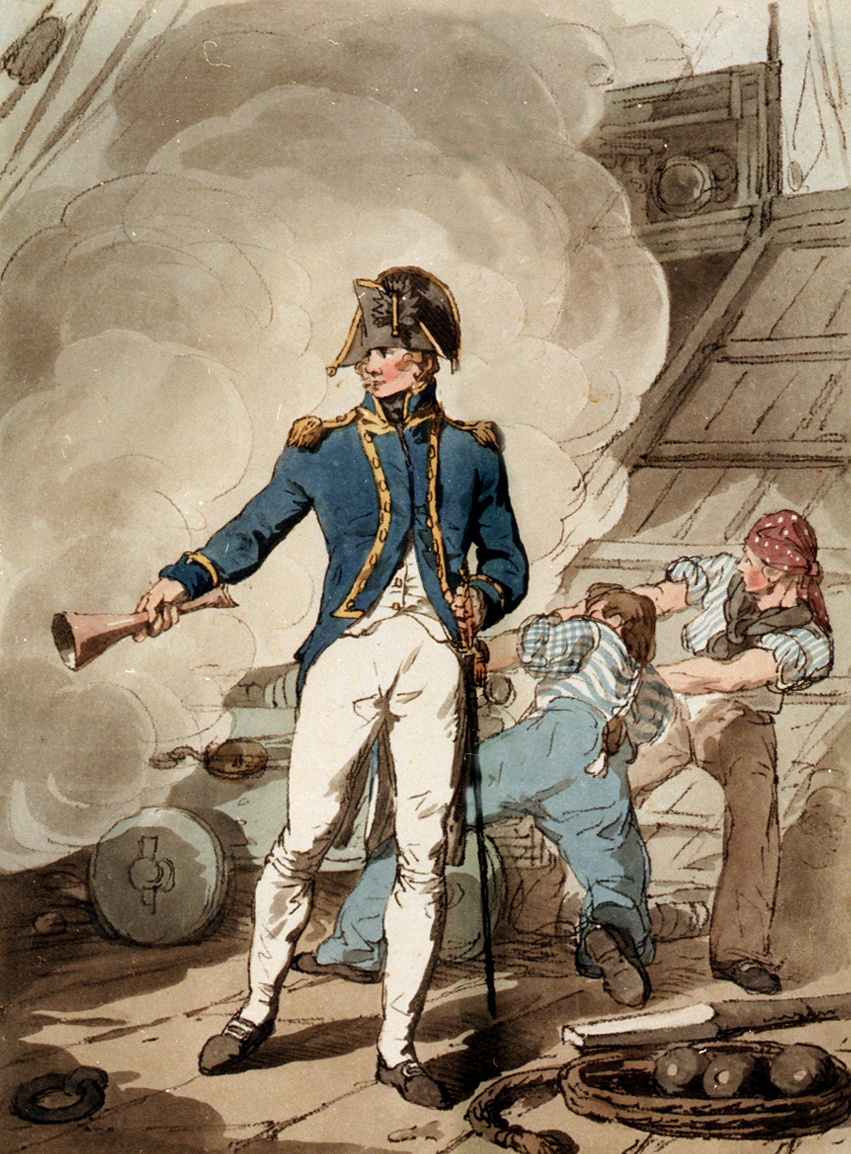
Uniform of a post-captain

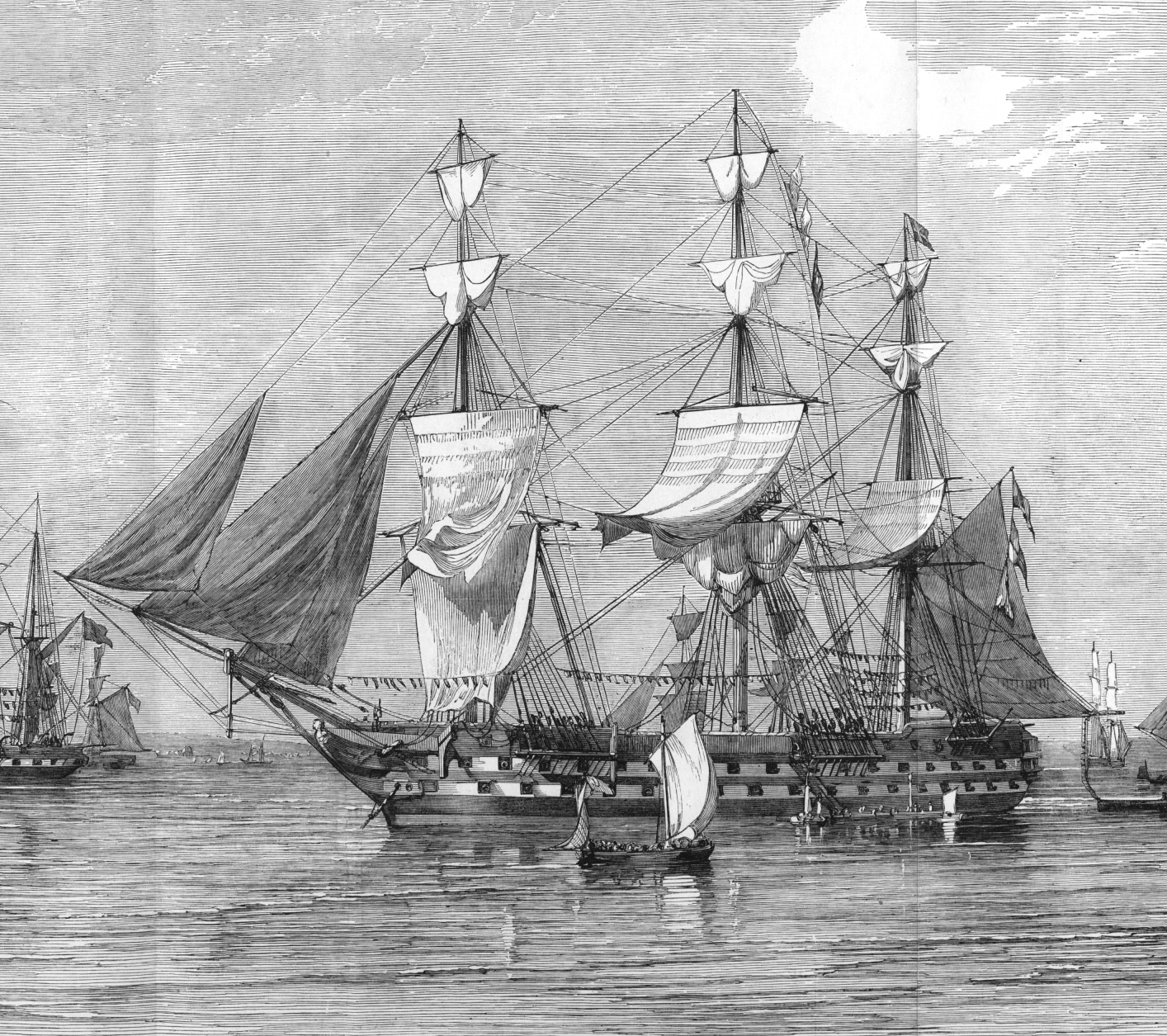
HMS Prince Regent (b.1823)

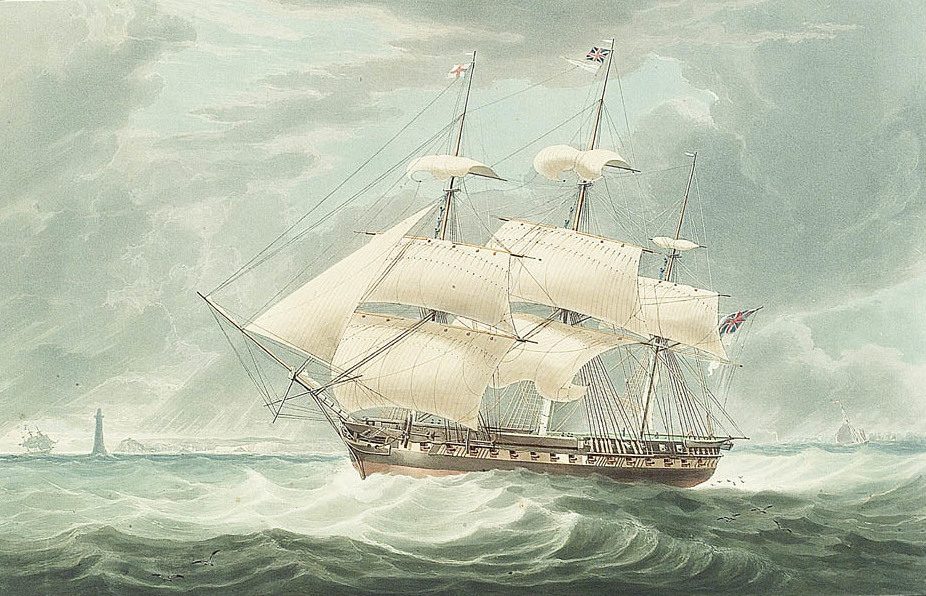
HMS Winchester (b.1822)

=== Retired rear-admiral, vice-admiral, admiral, 1838–1873 ===
On 6 June 1838, Sparshott was paid off, and his name appears as a retired captain in the Navy List of December 1848. He was promoted to retired rear admiral on 4 October 1855, at £365 (equivalent to £33,986.13 in 2025) per annum, then promoted to retired vice-admiral on 4 or 13 October 1862. He was finally promoted to retired-admiral on 2 April 1866, and retained this rank until his death in 1873.

=== Greenwich out-pensioner, 1846–1873 ===
Sparshott was accepted as an out-pensioner of Greenwich Hospital, London, on 4 November 1846.

== Awards ==
On 19 April 1831, Sparshott was nominated a Knight of Hanover (K.H.). He received the Order of the Red Eagle, making him a Knight of the Red Eagle of Prussia (K.R.E.), from the King of Prussia in 1832.

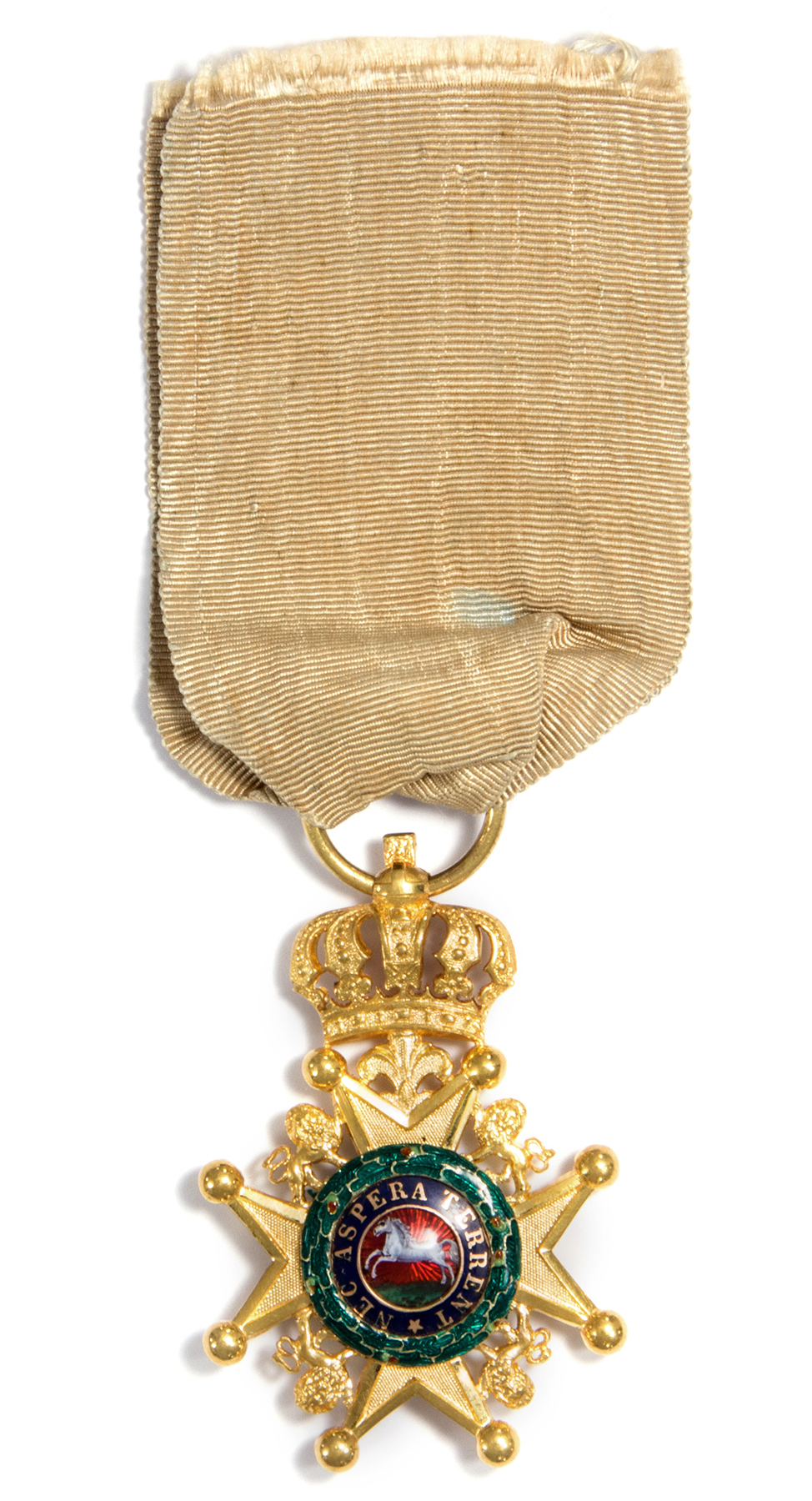
Royal Guelphic Order

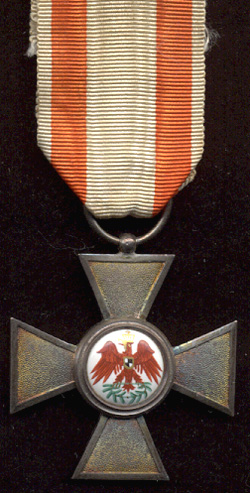
Order of the Red Eagle

== Business ==
In 1841, when both Sparshott and his brother Samuel were captains, they were patrons of the floating breakwater which had been invented by captain Tayler. The breakwater protected harbours from ocean swell, and was said to be less liable to storm damage than rigid wooden structures. It was a commercial endeavour which called for investors.
