= Samuel Sparshott =

Officer of the Royal Navy

- Born: 1783; Portsea, Hampshire, England
- Died: 10 November 1851 (aged 67–68); St John's Wood, Middlesex
- Burial place: Highgate Cemetery, London; 51°34′0.9″N 0°8′57.7″W
- Relatives: Edward Sparshott
- Military career
- Service: Royal Navy
- Service years: 1803–1849 or 1850
- Rank: Commander
- Commands: HMS Nimrod
- Conflicts: Napoleonic Wars
- Memorials: Memorial tablet in St Ann's Church, HMNB Portsmouth

Signature
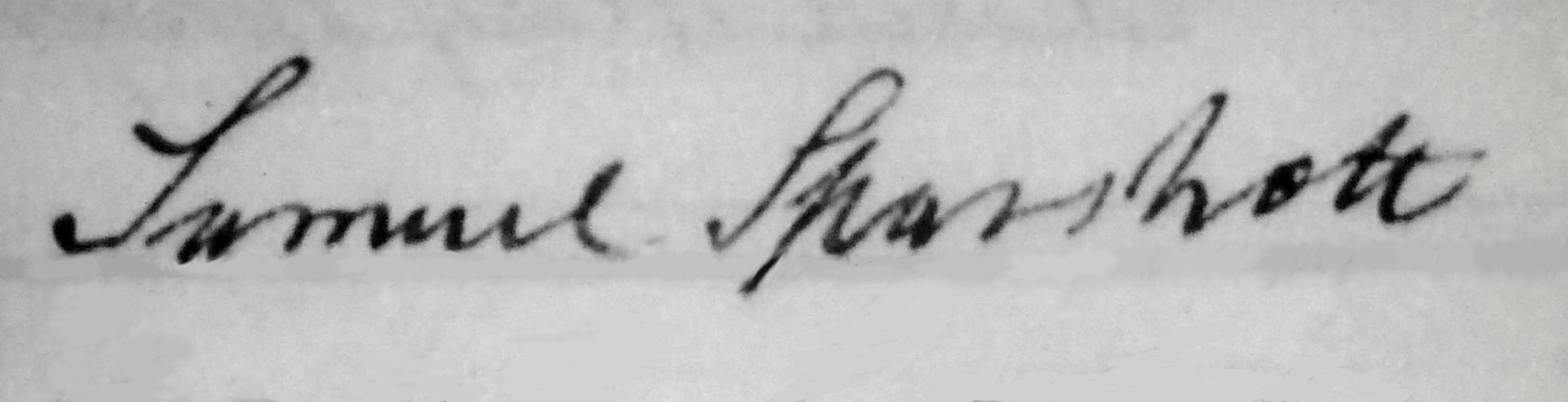

Commander Samuel Sparshott (1783 – 10 November 1851) was a Royal Navy officer who served in the Napoleonic Wars. As signal-mate on HMS Caledonia, he was called to testify at the court-martial of James, Lord Gambier. As commander, his last ship was HMS Nimrod, which was driven by a gale onto rocks in Holyhead Bay. Although he and his crew refloated the ship and brought her to dry dock for repair, she was too damaged for naval use, and was sold. His final office was Deputy Inspector-General of the Coast Guard, a position that he held for over twenty years. After he died, it was suggested that he might be called, "Father of the Coast Guard".

Sparshott was descended from Hampshire farmers, and was the seventh of eleven siblings. His brother was Admiral Edward Sparshott, R.N., K.H., K.R.E.

== Background ==
At least three generations of Sparshott's family lived in Hampshire. His paternal grandfather was husbandman John Sparshott, who had a small farm in Soberton. (Note: John Sparshott (Titchfield 1709 – Hamble March 1792)) His paternal grandmother was Elizabeth née Hall, (Note: Elizabeth Sparshott (Soberton 1710 – Portsea 1785) and his grandparents married in 1730. His father was Daniel Sparshott, who was later described as a gentleman. (Note: In 18th–19th century terms, a gentleman was a man living on his own means. It did not necessarily signify social rank or behaviour.) His mother was Mary née Sparkman, who signed her name with a cross on her marriage certificate. (Note: Daniel Sparshott (1750 – Portsea 15 January 1808). Daniel and Mary Sparshott's surname is spelled "Sparshett" in some records, as was their son Edward's surname in his baptism record.) They were married on 29 November 1771, in Hampshire. (Note: Mary Sparkman (Alton, Hampshire 25 September 1751 – Portsea, Portsmouth November 1821). From Winchester archive: Marriage certificate. "Daniel Sparshatt of this parish in the County of Southampton, and Mary Sparkman of the same parish, were married in this church by banns on this twenty-ninth day of November in the year one thousand seven hundred and seventy-one. The marriage was solemnised between us: Daniel Sparshat (signed); the mark X of Mary Sparkman".) They had 11 children, of whom most were born in Portsea, Portsmouth, and Samuel was the seventh. (Note: The 11 children of Daniel and Mary Sparshott included 2 sets of twins: William (1772–1858), Thomas (1772–1835), John (b.1774), James (1777–1854), Daniel (1781–1845), Joseph (b.1781), Samuel (1783–1851), Elizabeth (1785–1847), Ann (1786–1867), Sarah (b.1790), Edward (1801–1873)) He was born in 1783, in Portsea. and baptised on 10 April 1791, at St Mary's Church, Portsea. His brother was Admiral Edward Sparshott, R.N., K.H. In 1841, Sparshott and his brother Edward were living in Brompton, in Kensington, London, with Elizabeth and Sarah Sparshott, aged 27 and 23 respectively, and two servants. (Note: The 1841 England census does not give family relationships, and its given ages are often approximations. It is possible that Elizabeth and Sarah Sparshott were nieces of Samuel and Edward, but since the two men married Elizabeth Cooper and Sarah Cooper a year or two later, and Sarah was pregnant when she married, there is room for speculation.)

Sparshott married Elizabeth Cooper, daughter of farmer William Cooper, on 7 July 1842, in St Marylebone Parish Church. (Note: Elizabeth Cooper (Norfolk 1809 or 1814 – Bath 1897). GRO index:Marriages Sep 1842 Sparshott Samuel Marylebone and Cooper Elizabeth 1 207. Deaths Mar 1897 Sparshott Elizabeth 88 (or 83?) Bath 5c 433) They had no children. The 1851 census finds Sparshott aged 68, and his wife Elizabeth aged 37, living at 19 Marlborough Road, St John, St Marylebone, Middlesex. He died on 10 November 1851 at The Lodge, Marlborough Road, St John's Wood, Middlesex. (Note: GRO index: Deaths Dec 1851 Sparshott Samuel Marylebone I 170. The certificate says: 10 November 1851, Samuel Sparshott age 68, at The Lodge, Marlborough Road, St John's Wood, Middlesex.) He was buried on the same day at Highgate Cemetery. His will was proved at Canterbury on 5 December 1851. He left most of his assets to his wife Elizabeth, and an annuity to his god-daughter Sarah Sparshott, the daughter of his brother Edward. (Note: Probate of will of Samuel Sparshott: ref. PROB 12/269)

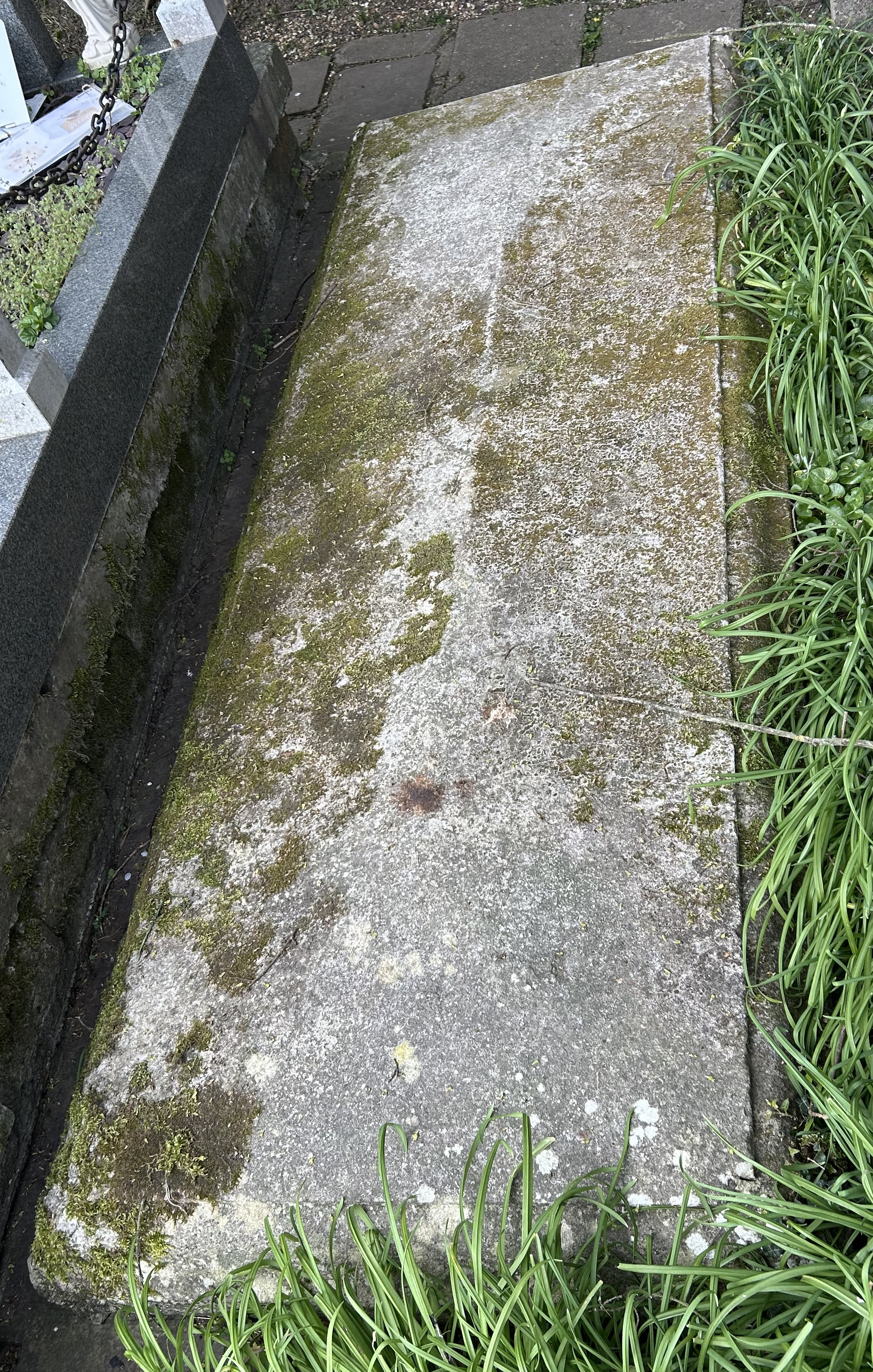
Tomb of Samuel Sparshott in Highgate Cemetery

A memorial tablet carved by Charles Raymond Smith was erected to Samuel Sparshott behind the pulpit of St Ann's Church, HMNB Portsmouth. Its inscription says:

To the memory of Samuel Sparshott, Royal Navy, who departed this life the 10th November 1851, in his 69th year while filling the office of Deputy Comptroller General of the Coastguard which he had held for nearly 25 yrs. This tablet is erected by officers and men of that service to record their high estimation of his character as an officer and gentleman.

The inscription on Sparshott's tomb on the western side of Highgate Cemetery is:

"Samuel Sparshott, Esq., Commander Royal Navy. For nearly twenty-five years Deputy Comptroller General of the Coast Guard, London, who died 10th November, 1851, aged 68 years"

== Career ==
=== Able seaman, 1803–c.1805 ===
HMS Prince of Wales (built 1794)

On 1 May 1803, at approximately 20 years old, Sparshott joined the Royal Navy as an able seaman, serving in the 98-gun HMS Prince of Wales under Captain John Giffard.

=== Midshipman and master's mate, c.1805–1809 ===
Sparshott continued in the Prince of Wales, and then in the 110-gun HMS Ville de Paris, as midshipman and master's mate. He served under the flags of Admiral Lord Gambier, Admiral Lord Gardner, Admiral Sir James Saumarez, Admiral Edward Thornbrough, and Admiral Sir Robert Calder. In the Ville de Paris he saw "action with the combined fleets of France and Spain off Cape Finisterre 22 July 1805, and in the [120-gun] Caledonia, as Signal Mate, at the destruction of the French shipping in Basque Roads in April, 1809". On 31 July 1809, Sparshott was a witness at the court-martial of James, Lord Gambier, testifying that a flag-signal from HMS Imperieuse, under Lord Cochrane's captaincy, called for assistance in attacking the French on 12 April 1809, saying, "The Imperieuse then made that half the fleet could destroy the enemy – seven on shore".

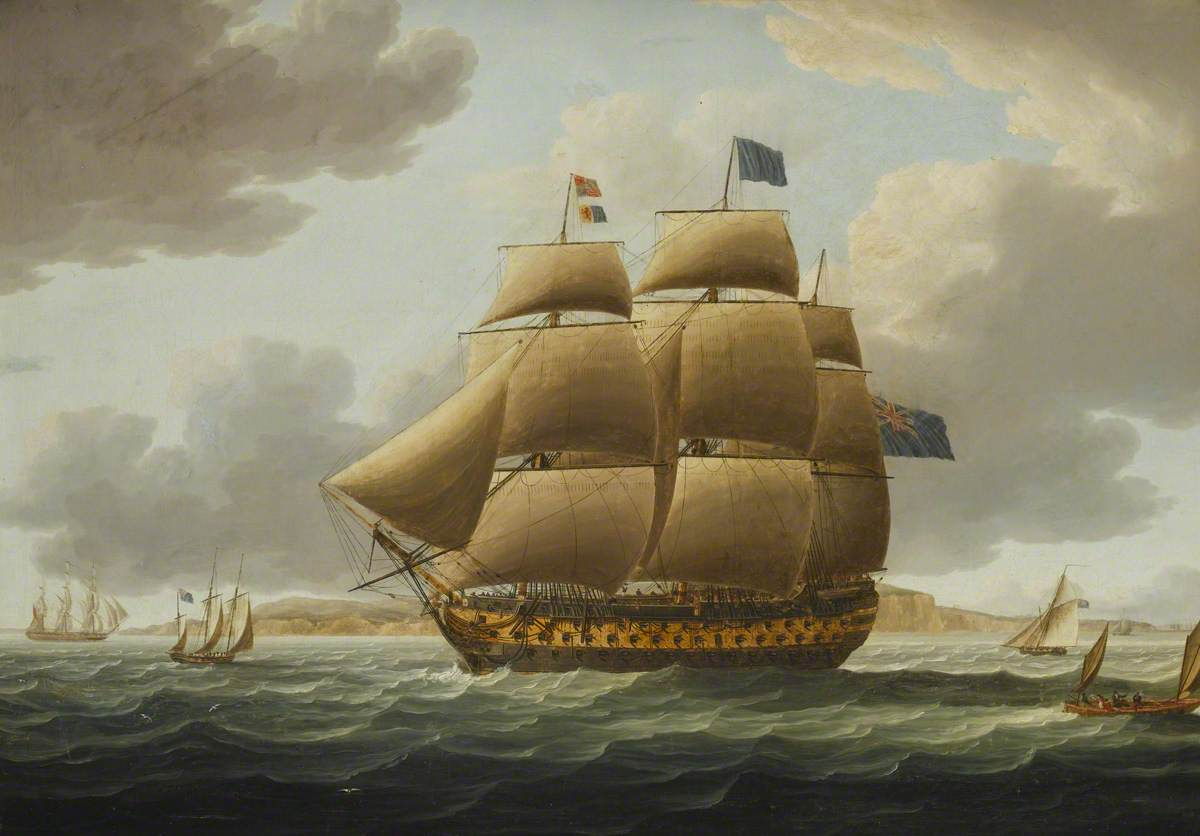
HMS Ville de Paris (built 1795)

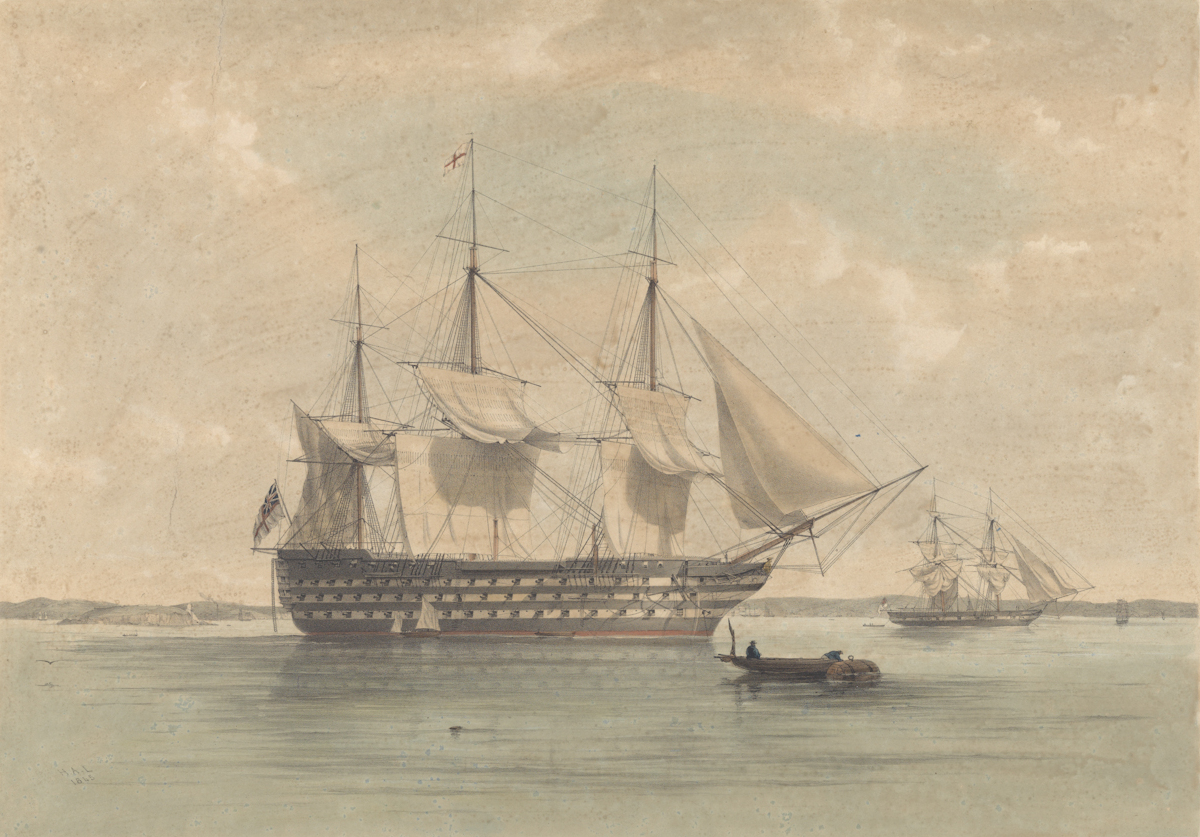
HMS Caledonia (b.1808)

=== Lieutenant, 1809–1818 ===
Sparshott passed the lieutenant's examination in May 1809, and was promoted to lieutenant on 22 August 1809, "for [his] distinguished service in the Basque Roads". On 31 August 1809 he was appointed to the 26-gun frigate HMS Ganymede, to serve at Home Station, the Mediterranean, and the West Indies, under Captain John Brett Purvis, Captain Robert Preston, Captain Edward Crofton, Captain Hassard Stackpoole, and Captain Robert Carteret. On 26 December 1811 he was appointed to the 32-gun frigate HMS Aquilon, under Captain William Bowles, serving in the North Sea and in the Baltic. "While serving in the Aquilon [in the Baltic] he commanded the boats of that ship at the destruction of a convoy off the island of Rügen". He then continued under Captain Bowles in the same ship, off the South American coast. In 1814 he sailed back to England, with Bowles, in the 32-gun HMS Ceres. On 5 August 1814 he was appointed to the 36-gun frigate HMS Euphrates, serving again under Captain Robert Preston, and cruising the Western Isles. Under Captain Bowles again, and still in the Western Isles, he sailed in the 38-gun HMS Menelaus on 22 September 1815, and to South America in the 32-gun frigate HMS Amphion, on 3 October 1815, again under Captain Bowles.

HMS Aquilon (built 1786)

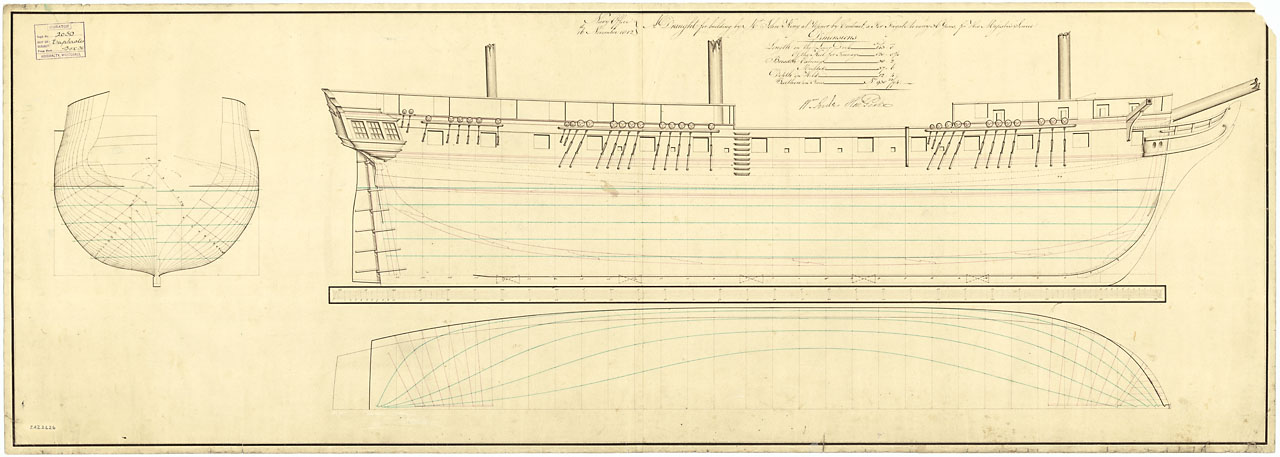
HMS Euphrates (b.1813)

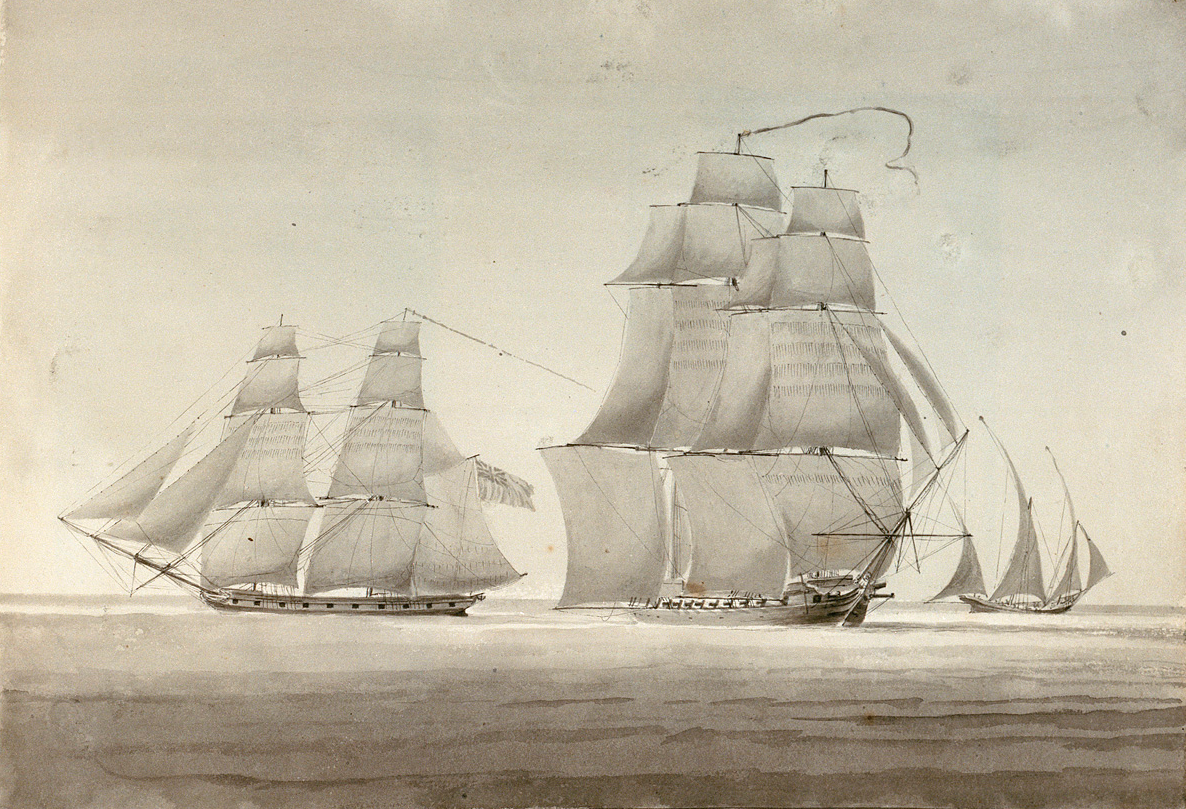
HMS Menelaus (b.1810), centre

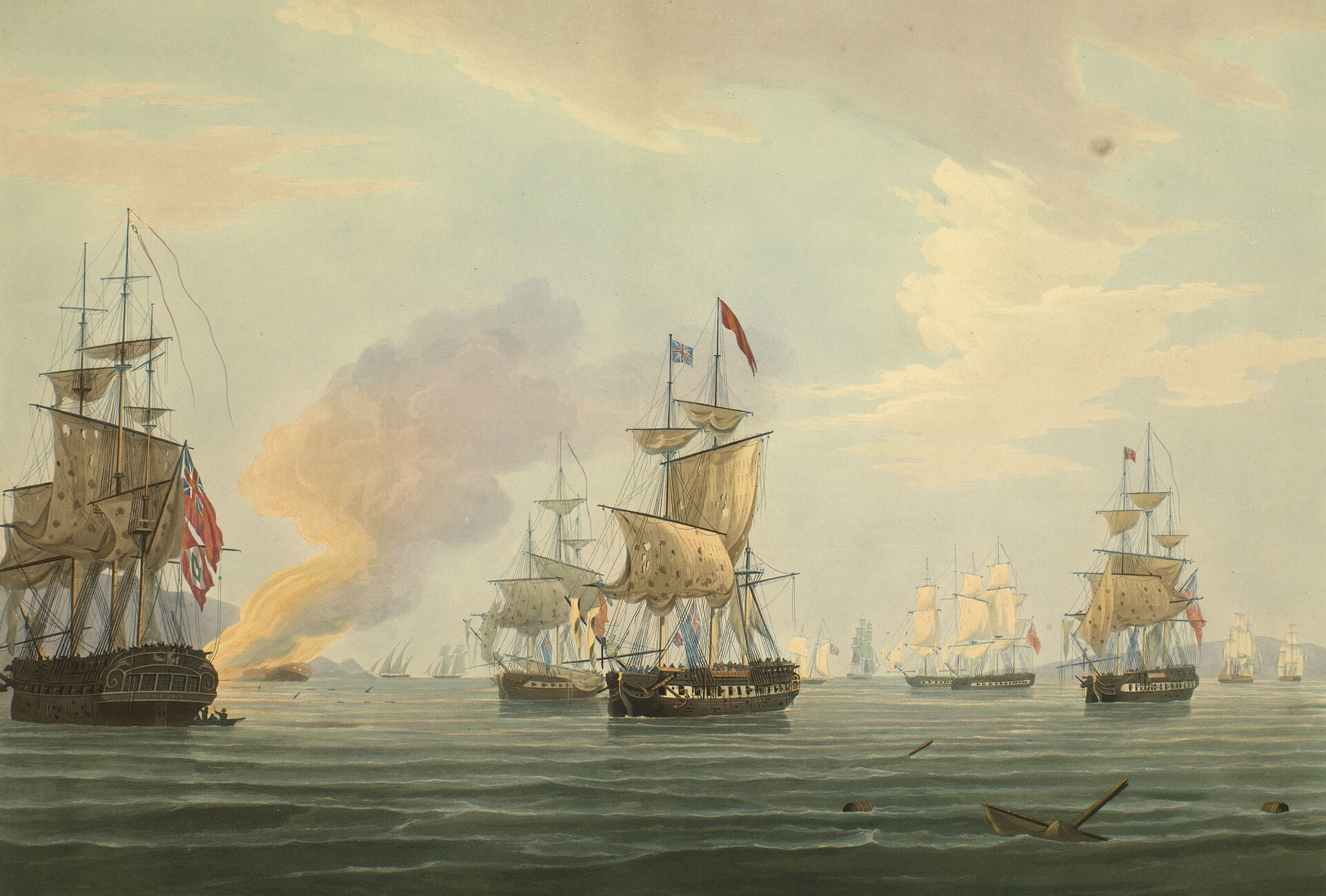
HMS Amphion (b.1798), centre

=== Commander, 1818–1827 ===
Sparshott was promoted to commander on 16 October 1818. In March 1823 he was "appointed to the Preventive Service, at Sheerness, in the room of Captain King, who is to superintend the Packet Service at Falmouth". He was appointed to the 18-gun HMS Nimrod on 13 September 1826, but in the following winter that ship was damaged:

[The] vessel, by the breaking of her anchor, drove on the rocks in Holyhead Bay and bilged, (Note: Bilged: a nautical term for being "holed in the bilge", or suffering a hole in the bottom of the hull.) during a gale from the north-north-west, on the night of 14 January 1827. She was got off, however, by the utmost exertion on the part of her Commander, officers and crew, was placed in a dry dock, and on 3 March following was sold.

Numerous other ships around the British Isles were damaged or lost in that N.N.W. gale, and Nimrod was not the only ship in Holyhead Bay to be driven onto the rocks on that day. There was also the American packet, Panthea, which was bringing despatches to Liverpool from the British ambassador to Mexico.

Holyhead, [14 January 1827], about 6 p.m., wind N.N.W. blowing a gale, blew His Majesty's ship, Nimrod, Captain Spartiate (sic), from Cork to the Clyde, brought up in these Roads and about midnight drove onto the shore and bilged; as did also the Panthea, [captained by] Hathaway, from New York to Liverpool, and it is feared both will be wrecked – all on board saved. (Note: This was the Liverpool merchant ship Panthea, known as the "American packet". It may be the same Panthea which transported immigrants from Liverpool to New York in 1846)

However, unlike Nimrod, Panthea was lost, although her crew were saved, with difficulty. By 30 January 1827, the circumstances of Nimrod's incident were better understood, following the publication of the ship's log. On the night of 14 January, Nimrod was taking shelter ...

... having been nearly lost at sea on the previous day, in the same violent gale of wind by which she was driven on shore at that anchorage. [The log] shews that all the resources and energies of the officers and men were employed to avert the danger, though not attended with the desired success – her fate was inevitable".

Marshall (1827) has a little more of the story:

On the account of this disaster reaching the Admiralty, a Master-attendant was sent round with succours from Plymouth, but, owing to strong easterly winds, he did not arrive at Holyhead until after the Nimrod had, by very great exertions on the part of her commander, officers and crew, been floated off the rocks, and placed in a dry dock. She was sold out of the service on the 3rd March following.

==== Log of HMS Nimrod ====
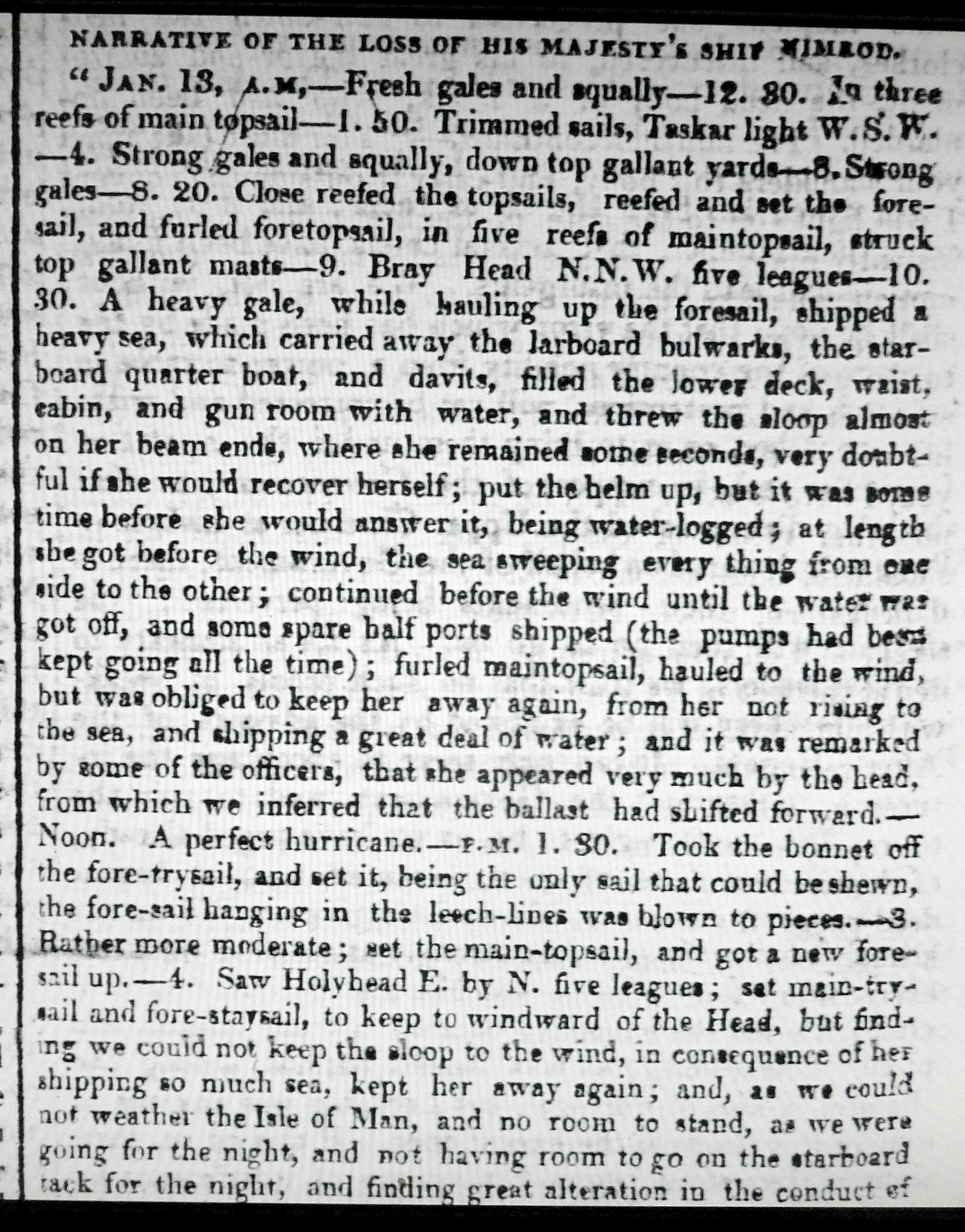
Log of HMS Nimrod, part I

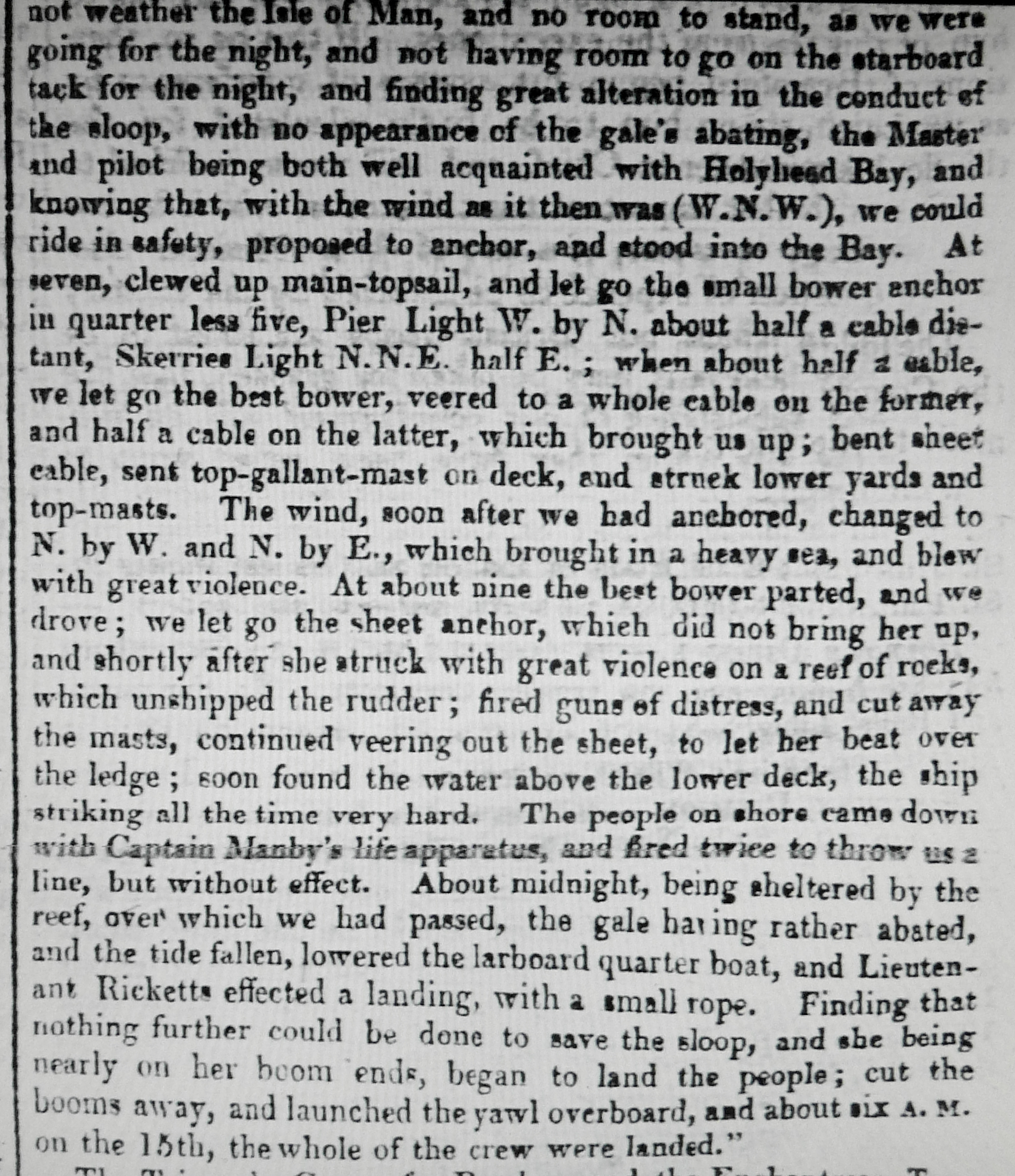
Log of HMS Nimrod, part II

Much of the above reaction to the loss of HMS Nimrod as a naval ship is informed by her log of 13–15 January 1827. It was written, or signed as accurate, by Sparshott. The following is a summary of the original log. What the log does not mention, is that this was January in a gale at sea, so that all of the crew were working soaking wet and cold.

Early on 13 January, a squall rose. The sloop made it to five leagues off Bray Head. Early on the morning of 14 January the ship was hit by a gale so bad that she had to reef all sails but one, and that one was ripped to shreds by the weather:

A heavy gale, while hauling up the foresail, shipped a heavy sea, which carried away the larboard bulwarks, the starboard quarter boat, and davits, filled the lower deck, waist, cabin, and gun room with water, and threw the sloop almost on her beam ends, where she remained some seconds, very doubtful if she would recover herself.

The waterlogged ship became difficult to control. It took a while to right her, and when she began to make way, "the sea [was] sweeping every thing from one side to the other". The vessel had already shipped a lot of water, and the ballast had shifted forward, so that the bows were ploughing in a heavy sea. In these conditions the crew were climbing among the spars, reefing sails, pulling down the foresail which was in pieces, and hoisting the fore-trysail as their only means of propulsion.

By midday, there was a "perfect hurricane". The wind had moderated somewhat, but the ship was not in a fit state to reach Holyhead or the Isle of Man, and shelter for the night was needed, so Sparshott made for Holyhead Bay, as a safe anchorage. It was necessary to prepare for a continuing gale with rising, falling and veering wind. Thus the ship was anchored pointing into the wind, with the small and best bower anchors set far apart so that the anchors and bow formed a triangle. When the wind veered, part of one chain could be hauled in, and the other chain partly let out, to keep the bows to the wind.

Almost as soon as the anchors were deployed, the wind veered, bringing in a "heavy sea" from the open water. There being no time to adjust via the anchor chains, the shank of the best bower anchor was broken by the shocks and strains caused by the gale, and the small bower could not hold the ship alone. The sheet anchor was immediately dropped, but there was neither time nor space to let out enough chain for the necessary catenary curve to facilitate proper dragging of the anchor. The anchor therefore could not be made to rotate in order to grip properly, thus the huge anchor could not stop the ship quickly enough to save her.

The sloop hit a rocky reef within the bay "with great violence", and the rudder was lost. The masts and rigging of a tall ship are subject to great forces during normal sailing; in a gale those forces are multiplied. At risk of their lives, the crew had been constantly climbing among spars, reefing and controlling sails, and pumping out water. At this point, Sparshott ordered "guns of distress" to be fired, and the larger masts to be cut down, leaving one sail to keep some control of the vessel's position. Meanwhile the hull was half full of water, and "striking all the time very hard" against the reef. Local people came and twice tried to fire a line to the crew, using Captain Manby's life apparatus, but the attempts failed. However, the crew's efforts got the hull over the reef and floating in sheltered water. By midnight the wind had abated and the tide was low, and quieter. One of the boats was put over the side, and all the crew taken safely to land, at six o'clock on the morning of 15 January. The reef was later named after HMS Nimrod. (Note: The log does not say whether the crew threw out the 18 guns to lighten the ship, to get her over the reef to safety. However, when Nimrod grounded off the American coast in 1814, she was floated off the reef without the need to throw out the guns. See "HMS Nimrod Cannons". plymoutharch.tripod.com. Plymouth Archaeological Rediscovery Project (PARP). 2004.)

==== Court-martial ====
HMS Trinculo brought the officers and crew of Nimrod from Milford Haven to Plymouth for the court-martial, which took place on 16 March 1827, on HMS Britannia, in Hamoaze. Sparshott testified in court, and he and his officers and crew were fully acquitted of the loss of the ship.

=== Coast Guard, 1827–1849 ===
While retaining the rank of commander for the rest of his life, Sparshott was promoted to Deputy Inspector-General of the Coast Guard on 16 May 1827. (Note: During Samuel Sparshott's era, "Coast guard" was written as two words. Sparshott's 16 May 1827 appointment was recorded in the Navy List of 1838.) He was on shore duty from 23 December 1842, based in London. On 10 August 1843, he testified to the Select Committee on Shipwrecks that "the authorities, in particular customs officers, had been stifled in their attempts to stop plundering activity [on shipwrecks] because of concerns over authority and fears of litigation if any wreckers were injured". In 1844, he was called to testify to the Select Committee on Tobacco Trade, on the level at which smuggling was controlled at that time. By the end of his career, he had overseen "the last flicker up of smuggling [in Cornwall] before its final suppression", that is to say, although the old, daring ways and old methods had subsided, a little smuggling did continue quietly. Shore (1892) says:

This particular time was marked by the death of Commander Sparshott, the Deputy Comptroller-general, who from his long and intimate connection with the force might in truth have been styled the Father of the Coastguard. Having been associated with it almost from its inception, he possessed a wider and more detailed knowledge of this branch of the public service than any living person, and his death at this particular period of its history was a singular coincidence.

The Coast Guard service published the following obituary on 13 November 1851:

The Board of Customs and the Comptroller-general of the Coastguard desire to record their sense of the loss which the coastguard service has sustained in the death of Commander Samuel Sparshott R.N., which took place on the 10th inst., at ten a.m., and whose long experience and zealous attention to the duties of his office as deputy Comptroller-general during a period of nearly twenty-five years the Board of Customs and Comptroller-general have fully appreciated.

Sparshott held the office at least until December 1848, although another source says that in 1849 he still held that post. (Note: According to his memorial plaque, Sparshott held the same coastguard office until his death in 1851.) In 1851 he was describing himself as a "commander, R.N".

== Business affairs ==
In 1841, when both Sparshott and his brother Edward were captains, they were patrons of the floating breakwater which had been invented by captain Tayler. The breakwater protected harbours from ocean swell, and was said to be less liable to storm damage than rigid wooden structures. It was a commercial endeavour which called for investors.
