= HMS San Josef =

Ship of the line of the Royal Navy

- San José (right) at the Battle of Cape St. Vincent

History

Spain
- Name: San José
- Ordered: 28 July 1781
- Builder: Ferrol
- Laid down: 9 November 1782
- Launched: 30 June 1783
- Captured: By the Royal Navy on 14 February 1797

Great Britain
- Name: HMS San Josef
- Acquired: Captured on 14 February 1797
- Reclassified: Gunnery training ship in 1837
- Fate: Broken up in May 1849

General characteristics
- Class & type: 114-gun first rate ship of the line
- Tons burthen: 2456 tons
- Length: 194 ft 3 in (59.21 m) (gundeck); 156 ft 11 in (47.83 m) (keel)
- Beam: 54 ft 3 in (16.54 m)
- Depth of hold: 24 ft 3.5 in (7.404 m)
- Propulsion: Sails
- Sail plan: Full-rigged ship
- Complement: 839
- Armament: Lower gundeck: 32 × 32-pounder guns; Middle gundeck: 32 × 24-pounder guns; Upper gundeck: 32 × 12-pounder guns; Quarterdeck: 12 × 9-pounder guns; Forecastle: 6 × 4-pounder guns

HMS San Josef was a 114-gun first-rate ship of the line of the Royal Navy. She was originally the Spanish Navy ship of the line San José, which was launched at Ferrol, Spain in 1783. San José was captured by the British navy at the Battle of Cape St. Vincent on 14 February 1797. The Royal Navy commissioned her as San Josef, and the ship saw service during the rest of the French Revolutionary and Napoleonic Wars; in 1809, she served as the flagship of Admiral John Thomas Duckworth. Reclassified as a gunnery training ship in 1837, she was decommissioned and broken up in 1849.

== Battle of Cape St Vincent ==
Nelson Boarding the San Josef by George Jones, 1829

The San José was among the Spanish fleet during the battle, during which HMS Captain, under the command of Captain Horatio Nelson came out of the line to attack the San Nicolás. After exchanging fire, Nelson led his forces aboard the San Nicolás. While the British were fighting their way aboard the crew of San José continued to fire upon Captain and San Nicolás. The San José then fell upon the San Nicolás and their rigging became tangled. Trapped, the men from the San José continued to fire on the British boarding parties with muskets and pistols.

Nelson then took his men from the decks of the San Nicolás aboard the San José, forcing the Spanish to surrender, with their Admiral badly injured. The San José and the San Nicolás, both captured by Nelson, were two of the four ships captured during the battle. After their capture they were renamed HMS San Josef and HMS San Nicolas respectively. The feat of using one enemy vessel as a 'stepping stone' to capture another was afterwards facetiously known in the Royal Navy as "Nelson's patent bridge for boarding first rates".

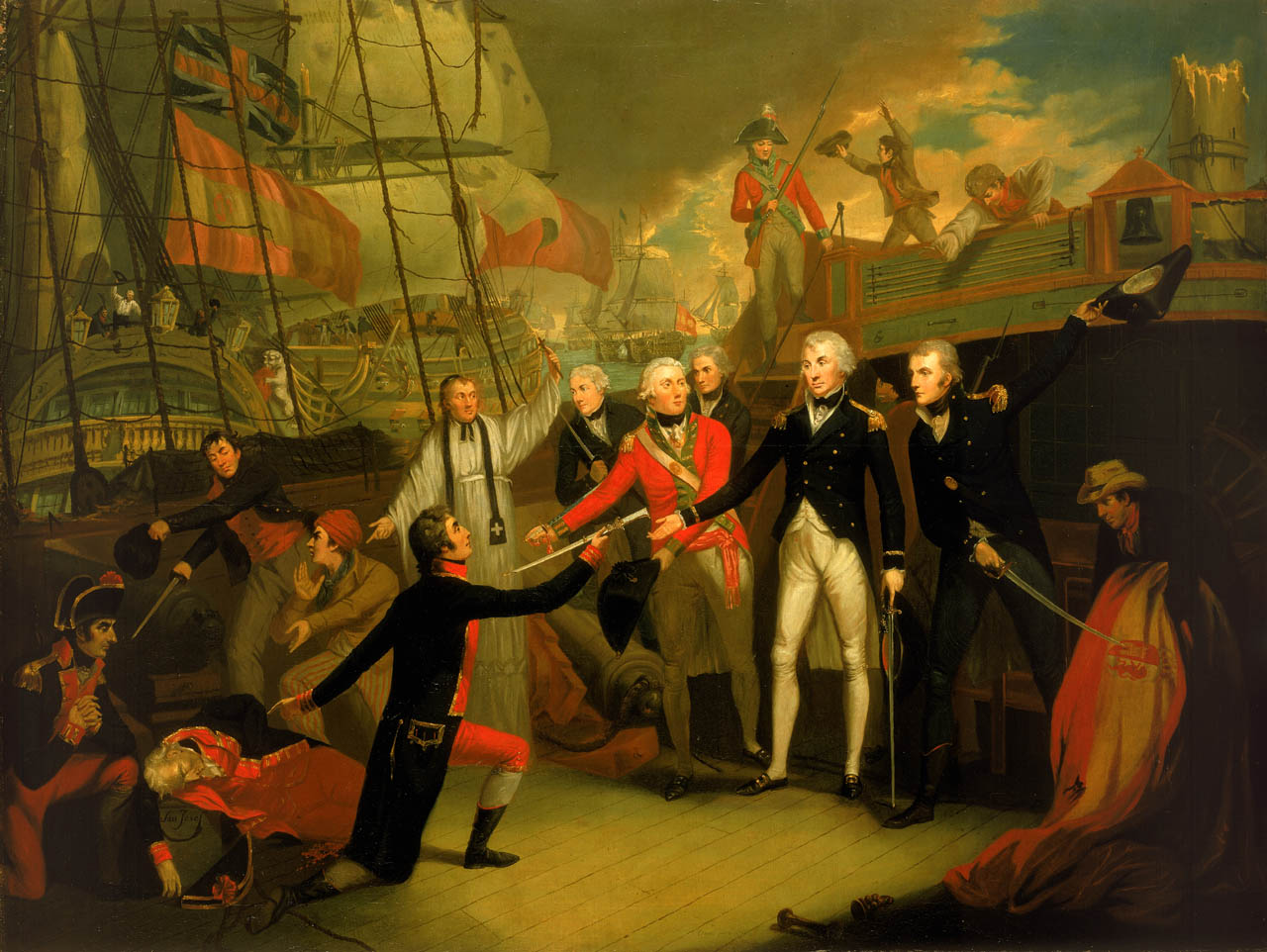
Nelson receives the surrender of the San José from her captain, the Spanish Admiral, Don Francisco Javier Winthuysen y Pineda lies mortally wounded on the deck

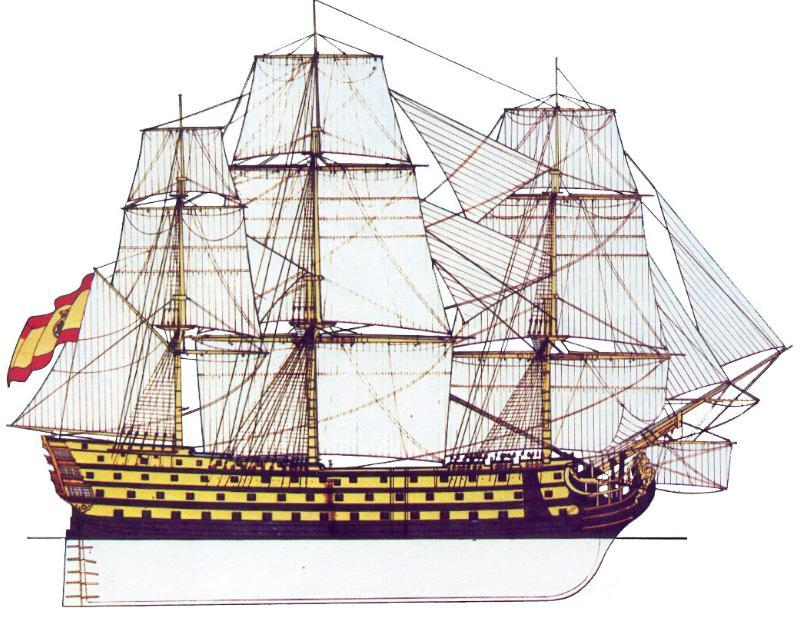
Print of San José in Spanish service

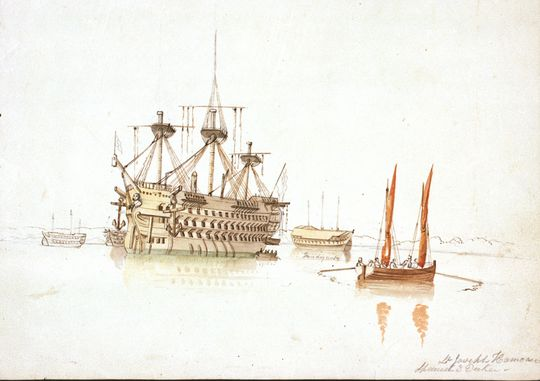
HMS San Josef in later Royal Naval service

== Later career ==
From 1839 San Josef was used as a gunnery training ship. From 10 August 1841 she was commanded by Captain Joseph Needham Tayler, serving as a guard ship at Devonport (established gunnery school). Other captains who served in her include: Captain Frederick William Burgoyne, while serving as the flagship of Samuel Pym, Plymouth; Captain Henry John Leeke; and Captain Thomas Maitland, as the flagship of Admiral William Hall Gage, Devonport. She was broken up at Devonport in May 1849. Her figurehead was preserved, and for many years adorned a building (which served for a time as a sailmaking loft) in the Royal Victoria Victualling Yard, Deptford.

Some small pieces of the San Josef still survive to this day. One is in the form of part of a wooden gun carriage; called a Quoin. This quoin can be found among the Valhalla figurehead collection in Tresco Abbey Gardens in the Isles of Scilly. Another is a carved Triumph of Arms from the stern rail sold at Bonhams in London in October 2014. Parts of the ship were used in the re-building of St Nicholas' Church, West Looe in 1852.

== Legacy ==
San Josef Mountain on the South Coast of British Columbia, on the south side of Estero Basin on Frederick Arm to the west of the mouth of Bute Inlet, was named in 1864 by Captain Pender for the San Josef, while Departure Bay and Nanaimo Harbour at the city of Nanaimo were originally named (in 1791) the Bocas de Winthuysen after Rear-Admiral Don Francisco Xavier Winthuysen.

== Bibliography ==
- Sconce, Robert Clement, Life and Letters of R. C. Sconce, formerly Secretary to Admiral Sir John Duckworth, Compiled by Sarah S. Bunbury. in two volumes, Cox & Wyman, London, 1861
- Winfield, Rif (2008) [2005]. British Warships in the Age of Sail 1793–1817: Design, Construction, Careers and Fates (2nd, revised ed.). Seaforth. ISBN 978-1-84415-717-4.
- Winfield, Rif; Tredrea, John M.; García-Torralba Pérez, Enrique & Blasco Felip, Manuel (2023). Spanish Warships in the Age of Sail 1700—1860: Design, Construction, Careers and Fates. Seaforth Publishing. ISBN 978-1-5267-9078-1.
