= HMS Rochfort =

Ship of the line of the Royal Navy

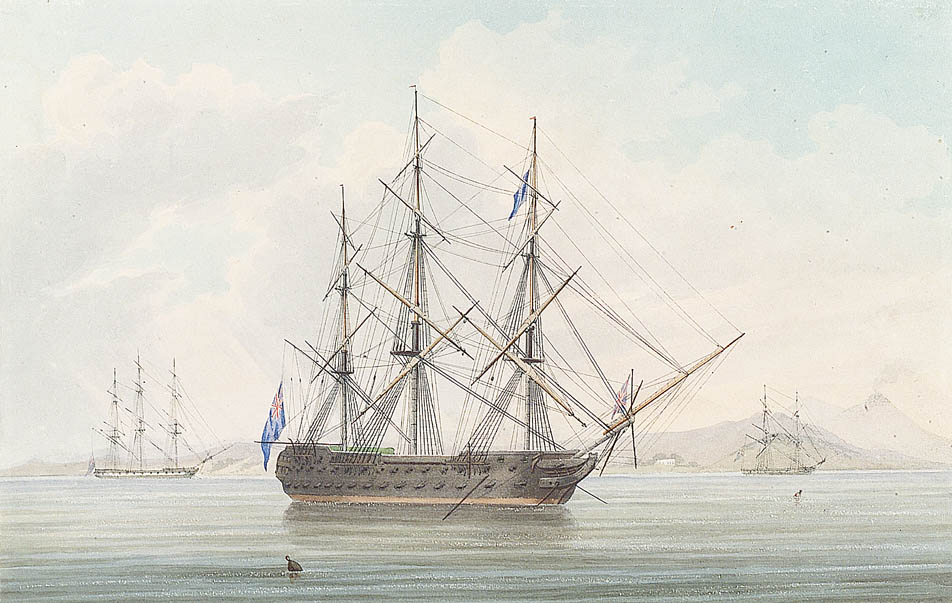
- Rochfort during the internment of Sir Thomas Freemantle on 22 December 1819, at Baia Bay, Naples

History

United Kingdom
- Name: HMS Rochfort
- Ordered: 1 June 1809
- Builder: Jacobs, Milford Haven
- Laid down: August 1809
- Launched: 6 August 1814
- Fate: Broken up, 1826

General characteristics
- Class & type: 74-gun third rate ship of the line
- Tons burthen: 2082 bm
- Length: 192 ft 8.5 in (58.738 m) (gundeck)
- Beam: 49 ft 4.5 in (15.050 m)
- Depth of hold: 21 ft (6.4 m)
- Propulsion: Sails
- Sail plan: Full-rigged ship
- Armament: Gundeck: 28 × 32-pounder guns; Upper gundeck: 28 × 18-pounder guns; Quarterdeck: 4 × 12-pounder guns + 10 × 32-pounder carronades; Forecastle: 2 × 12-pounder guns + 2 × 32-pounder carronades; Poop deck: 6 × 18-pounder carronades

HMS Rochfort was a 74-gun third rate ship of the line of the Royal Navy, launched on 6 August 1814 at Milford Haven. She was designed by the French émigré Jean-Louis Barrallier, and was the only ship built to her draught. A second ship, Sandwich, was cancelled in 1811 before construction could be completed.

Lloyd's List reported in May 1817 that the Revenue cutter stork and Rochefort's tender "Cornelian" had recaptured the ship Catherina, of and from Hamburg for Lisbon, and the galiot Catherina, of Oldenborg from Antwerp for Havre, which a Tunesian schooner had captured on 27 May. The British also captured the schooner and brought all three vessels into Dover.

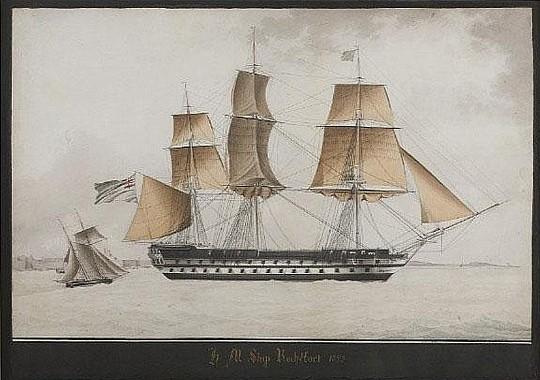
Rochefort, off Malta, 1822, by Nicolas Cammillieri

== Fate ==
Rochfort was broken up in 1826.
