= Joseph Needham Tayler =

British Royal Navy admiral (1783–1864)

Vice-Admiral Joseph Needham Tayler CB
- Born: 15 August 1783; Devizes, Wiltshire
- Died: 19 March 1864 (aged 80); Brixton, London
- Military career
- Allegiance: Great Britain; United Kingdom
- Branch: Royal Navy
- Service years: 1796–1846
- Rank: Vice-Admiral
- Commands: HMS Sparrow; HMS San Josef
- Conflicts: French Revolutionary Wars; Napoleonic Wars; Raid on Boulogne; Second Battle of Copenhagen; Walcheren Campaign; Peninsular War
- Awards: Order of the Bath (1815)

Vice-Admiral Joseph Needham Tayler CB (15 August 1783 – 19 March 1864) was an officer of the British Royal Navy who served during the French Revolutionary and Napoleonic Wars, mainly as a junior officer, before finally achieving command of his own ship in 1810, serving off the coast of northern Spain. His active career was cut short by serious injury in 1813, and he then concentrated on his inventions and innovations in naval technology. He commanded a naval gunnery school in the late 1830s, before being retired in 1846.

== Biography ==
=== Family background ===
Tayler was born in Devizes, Wiltshire, the youngest son of Samuel Tayler and Sally Needham. His father was a senior member of the Corporation of Devizes, served six times as Mayor, and also formed and commanded the Devizes Loyal Volunteers. His mother was the daughter of Joseph Needham, surgeon and man-midwife, and the niece of Henry Needham, a co-partner with his uncle, Robert Rogers, in the bank of Child & Co. His eldest brother, also Samuel, was a lieutenant in the 13th Light Dragoons, and was killed in Portugal; another brother, Thomas, was a major in the Bengal 9th Native Infantry, and died in India.

=== Early naval career ===
Tayler entered the navy in July 1796 as a first-class volunteer on board the 100-gun ship Royal George, flagship of Lord Bridport in the Channel Fleet, under the command of Captain William Domett. In April–May 1797 he was present in her at the Spithead mutiny. In 1799 he moved to the razee frigate Anson, Captain Philip Charles Durham, which was occasionally employed attending the Royal Family off Weymouth, and was in waiting upon the King in a boat whenever he went afloat. On 27 April 1800 he assisted in the capture of the letter of marque Vainqueur from Bordeaux bound for St. Domingo, and two days afterwards, in the capture of the 18-gun privateer Hardi, which was in company with the 18-gun Guepe, and the 36-gun Braave and Druide. Tayler was also employed in landing arms at Quimper, and in otherwise aiding the French royalists. On 27 June 1800, while escorting a fleet of transport ships from Gibraltar and Minorca, Anson captured seven merchant vessels on the Spanish coast between Tarifa and Algeciras, even though they were protected by shore batteries and covered by the fire of 25 heavy gunboats. She also drove two gunboats, each mounting two long 18-pounders and eight smaller guns, onto the coast, where Tayler, in a boat, assisted in taking possession of one of them – the crew having abandoned ship. He then followed Captain Durham into the 40-gun frigate Endymion, visited Saint Helena and Lisbon, and took part in the capture of the 14-gun French cutter-privateer Furie on 13 April 1801.

=== Lieutenant ===
Tayler was promoted to lieutenant on 29 April 1802, and on 18 October 1803 he was appointed to the 50-gun fourth-rate Leopard, serving in her under Captains James Nicoll Morris, Francis William Austen, and Richard Raggett. Leopard was part of the squadron stationed off Boulogne during Napoleon's planned invasion, and Tayler assisted in the capture of seven French gun-vessels. In October 1804 he was present at the Raid on Boulogne when the British used Robert Fulton's catamaran-torpedoes in an attempt to attack the French invasion fleet. On 30 March 1806 Leopard sailed from St Helens, Isle of Wight, with orders to escort six Indiamen as far as the Cape Verde islands. At 2 a.m. on 20 April one of the convoy, the Lady Burgess, struck Laten's Level, a rocky reef near Santiago. At daylight it was seen that her masts had fallen, and that the sea was breaking over her. Tayler volunteered to take a boat to her assistance. He contrived to throw a block attached to a rope over the stump of her bowsprit, and rescued 21 people before she broke up; nine more people were rescued from the sea. Two of the Indiaman's boats had already escaped with the captain and several others aboard; but 38 were lost. On 19 August 1806 Tayler transferred to the Leander under Captain Richard Raggett, for passage home from Halifax, Nova Scotia.

On 16 March 1807 he joined the 74-gun Maida, under Captain Samuel Hood Linzee, and took part in the expedition against Copenhagen. During the siege of the city he commanded a party of seamen ashore, manning a battery. On the return of the fleet to England he was employed, as first lieutenant of Maida, removing masts and stores from the captured Danish ships. In mid-1808 (a few months after the Maida was paid off) he joined the Spencer, flagship of Rear-Admiral Robert Stopford on the blockade of the coast of France, serving as first lieutenant. At one point Tayler was sent ashore at Quimper to distribute propaganda placards proclaiming the British victories in Spain. Spencer was paid off at Plymouth in January 1809. On 12 April 1809 Tayler joined the frigate Heroine, Captain Hood Hanway Christian, and took part in the Walcheren Campaign. He was present at the forcing of the batteries between Flushing and Cadzand on 11 August 1809, prior to joining in the attack on Flushing. He left Heroine after only seven months, and on 12 June 1810 he joined the brig Goldfinch, Captain Arden Adderley, operating off the north coast of Spain.

=== Commander ===
On 27 August 1810 Tayler was promoted to commander aboard the 16-gun Fly-class brig-sloop Sparrow, and sailed for the West Indies aboard the sloop Spitfire, eventually joining his ship on 2 February 1811. Sparrow spent several months on anti-piracy patrol in the Mona Passage, before returning to England in company with the brig Elk, escorting a fleet of merchant ships. During the voyage they recaptured a large ship laden with colonial produce. He then returned to the northern coast of Spain where he was engaged in surveying various harbours, particularly Saint-Jean-de-Luz, and gathering intelligence on the strength of the French garrisons along the Biscay coast.

During the winter of 1811-1812 Sparrow was stationed off Cape Matxitxako, and captured a French letter of marque, and also a brig laden with cotton and rice.

In June 1812 Tayler took part in the reduction of Lekeitio, and then in the destruction of enemy fortifications at Bermeo, Plentzia, Galea, Algorta, Begoña, El Campillo las Quersas, Xebiles, and Castro. In July, he took part in the attacks upon Puerta Galletta and Getaria. He then twice forced a passage between the fortress of San Salvador de Hano and the Isla de Mouro at the entrance of the Bay of Santander, and also made a reconnaissance of Santoña, Getaria, and Hondarribia. Tayler also submitted a plan to Commodore Sir Home Riggs Popham for a surprise attack on the batteries along the river Bidasoa and destroying the bridge at Irun.

On 21 March 1813 Sparrow captured the American ship Oneida, and on 31 March captured the Lightning.

In early May 1813, Sir George Collier commander of the British squadron operating on the north coast of Spain, sent the brig-sloops Lyra, Commander Robert Bloye; Royalist, Commander Gordon Bremer, and Sparrow, Commander Tayler, to assist the Spanish at the town of Castro Urdiales, which was under siege from a force of 13,000 French troops. The British ships arrived there on 4 May, landing guns and manning batteries for the defence of the town, whose garrison numbered no more than 1,200. Tayler used an improved gunsight, of his own design, which combined elevation and line of sight in one focus, and enabled him to fire shells with such precision that two out of every three burst in the French batteries. Despite this, by the morning of the 11th the French gun batteries had made a practicable breach in the town's walls, and the British were compelled to re-embark their guns and men, and prepare for a retreat. At 9 p.m. the French launched their assault via the breach and by escalade, forcing the Spanish defenders to retreat street by street to the castle, from where they were evacuated. The British were able to take about 1,150 men of the garrison to Bermeo. Castro Urdiales was then blockaded, until on 22 June the French were forced out, and Tayler promptly garrisoned the castle. At Lekeitio, on the night of 10 June 1813, Sparrow and the brig Constant brought off 1,270 Spanish troops, who were closely pursued by a superior enemy force. In late June Sparrow conveyed the British staff officer John Fremantle to England with the despatches announcing the victory at the battle of Vitoria, before returning to Spain.

Tayler came close to death or serious injury twice; at Plentzia, during the destruction of the fort by explosives, he narrowly avoided several tons of falling masonry, and later at Castro Urdiales he was pointing a carronade, when it was struck by a 12-pound shot, causing considerable damage. Tayler insisted on continuing to load and fire the gun despite fears that it would burst. However his luck finally ran out on 24 July 1813 during the Siege of San Sebastián, when he was ordered, with the other small vessels of the squadron, to conduct a diversionary attack on the north side of Mount Urgull. During the operation a shell hit the battery Tayler was commanding, and he was injured in the head and groin, and his left leg was shattered. Tayler was taken back to the naval hospital at Plymouth where his leg was saved, but he was confined to hospital for seven months, and it was more than two years before he was completely recovered.

=== Post-war career ===
In recognition of his services and injuries Tayler was promoted to post-captain on 16 August 1813. On 12 November 1814 he was awarded a yearly pension of £200, increased on 2 December 1815 to £250, and was made a Companion of the Order of the Bath on 8 December 1815. He was also presented with the sum of £100 by the Patriotic Society, and the Corporation of Devizes presented him with the freedom of the borough.

Tayler applied to the Admiralty several times for a command at sea, but was politely turned down each time. In 1816 he requested a ship to take part on the Bombardment of Algiers, and a few years later, citing his local knowledge of the coast, offered his services during the political turmoil in Portugal. In April 1828 another application stated that "he was in the prime of life, quite recovered from his wounds, and ready for any service or climate". In August 1831 in a request to Sir James Graham, he noted that "if the crew of a frigate was required, he could obtain volunteers to man one with dispatch". The same month he offered his services as flag captain to Sir Philip Durham, under whom he had served as a midshipman. Durham replied in friendly terms, but also reminded him that 20 years service as captain as considered necessary to command a first rate.

Tayler's persistence and evident expertise eventually led to his final naval appointment, to the ship San Josef, where between July 1838 and August 1841 he established a naval gunnery school. On 16 November 1846 Tayler accepted retirement from the navy, and promotion to rear admiral with seniority dating from 1 October. On 17 May 1858 he was promoted to vice admiral, with seniority dating from 28 December 1855.

=== Inventions ===
Tayler was also an inventor and innovator. During the siege of Copenhagen in 1807 he improvised a new means of landing the ship's guns from boats, and also a gun carriage. In 1808 he devised an improved compass mounting. In 1811, while sailing home from the West Indies, he formulated a code of signals made by means of telegraphic shades instead of flags. In 1828 he submitted to the Prince Regent "A Plan of Internal Defence", and in November 1829 he sent to the Admiralty some remarks on the best mode of preventing "pestilential fevers", and offered his services to carry them out at Gibraltar. On 23 November 1831, Tayler sent to the Marquis of Lansdowne, then the Lord President of the Council, a plan for a Registry of Seamen, which would do away with the need for impressment. In 1838 he took out a patent on a new form of breakwater, and in 1840 another for improvements to steam vessels, and in 1843, in partnership with the civil engineer William Henry Smith, registered a patent for improvements in breakwaters, beacons, and sound alarms. He also invented a floating breakwater, and published a book On Naval Tactics and Gunnery. In 1840 Tayler published his Plans for the Formation of Harbours of Refuge, and in 1848 The Defence of the Coast of Great Britain. A model of his floating breakwater was displayed at The Great Exhibition of 1851, but appears to have had only moderate success in practice. In 1852 he submitted to Trinity House a proposal to erect a "Shipwreck Asylum" on the Goodwin Sands. Nothing came of this proposal, but a harbour of refuge seems to have been erected at Le Havre in 1855 in accordance with his suggestions.

=== Innovations in naval gunnery ===
Tayler was a regular correspondent with the Admiralty on the subject of his innovations in naval gunnery. In February 1815 he wrote concerning his improved gun-sight, which he had used with great effect during the defence of Castro Urdiales, and was informed that his "plans had been laid before the Board". In February 1822, he wrote again pointing out that Colonel Howard Douglas' work on naval gunnery, published in 1817, contained a design for new gun-sight that was very similar to his own, which he had used in 1812. In reply the Admiralty pointed out that Douglas' book "was not under the sanction of the Lords Commissioners of the Admiralty." In January 1824 Tayler wrote to the Admiralty again this time with a model of an improved naval gun-carriage, which allowed all the guns of a broadside to be concentrated on a single point, and in January 1828 another with a design for an improved bomb vessel. In September 1829 he drew their attention to his various inventions, again offering to demonstrate them at his own expense. In December 1830 he wrote requesting acknowledgement as the inventor of the system of directing a broadside to a single point, following the demonstration of a similar system devised by a Mr. Kennish aboard Excellent. In January 1831 he reminded the Admiralty that he was asking for recognition not money, and in November the same year wrote "with some surprise and great regret", that a Captain Smith of the Royal Artillery was now being credited with the invention of a means of concentrating a ship's broadside to a single point. In February 1832 Tayler submitted another design and model for a traversing gun-carriage, which required half the number of men to work, and did away with the handspike, tackles, and crowbar used to train the gun. In reply he was informed that "their Lordships could not order any trial of his improved gun-carriage to be made at the expense of Government", to which he replied offering a trial at his own expense at Portsmouth. After this offer was again turned down, Tayler abandoned his correspondence with the Admiralty on the subject. His gun-carriage model was donated to the United Service Museum.

=== Building Devizes ===
After 1830 Tayler became a property developer in Devizes. He built new shops on the south-east side of the Brittox, new houses on the south side of Wine Street and in Long Street, a middle-class terrace in Bath Road, called Trafalgar Place, and, at the other end of the town, Southgate House and Villas. He was also a founder member of the Devizes Literary and Scientific Institution in 1833, and in October 1834, was presented with service of plate from the leading citizens of Devizes "in token of the high esteem they entertain for him, and in testimony of his active and independent exertions in promoting, upon all occasions, the prosperity of his native town, and the welfare of its inhabitants."

Tayler's building projects do not seem to yielded much profit, as by February 1842 he was being held in the Queen's Bench Prison for debt, when an order was made by the Court for Relief of Insolvent Debtors assigning his estate and effects to the Provisional Assignee on the petition of his creditors.

=== Death ===
During the later part of his life Tayler resided in Brixton, South London, and died there on 18 March 1864.
