= Soberton =

Village and parish in Hampshire, England

Coordinates: 50.945735°N 1.1302°W

- Location within Hampshire
- Population: 218; 1,616 (2011 Census)
- OS grid reference: SU6120216615
- District: Winchester
- Shire county: Hampshire
- Region: South East
- Country: England
- Sovereign state: United Kingdom
- Post town: Southampton
- Postcode district: SO32
- Dialling code: 01489
- Police: Hampshire and Isle of Wight
- Fire: Hampshire and Isle of Wight
- Ambulance: South Central
- UK Parliament: Winchester

Soberton is a village in the Meon Valley, Hampshire, England, east of the A32 and a few miles south of the village of Droxford. It appears in the Domesday Book as "Sudbertone" or "Sudbertune". For administration, it is in the Hampshire County Council area, headquartered in Winchester.

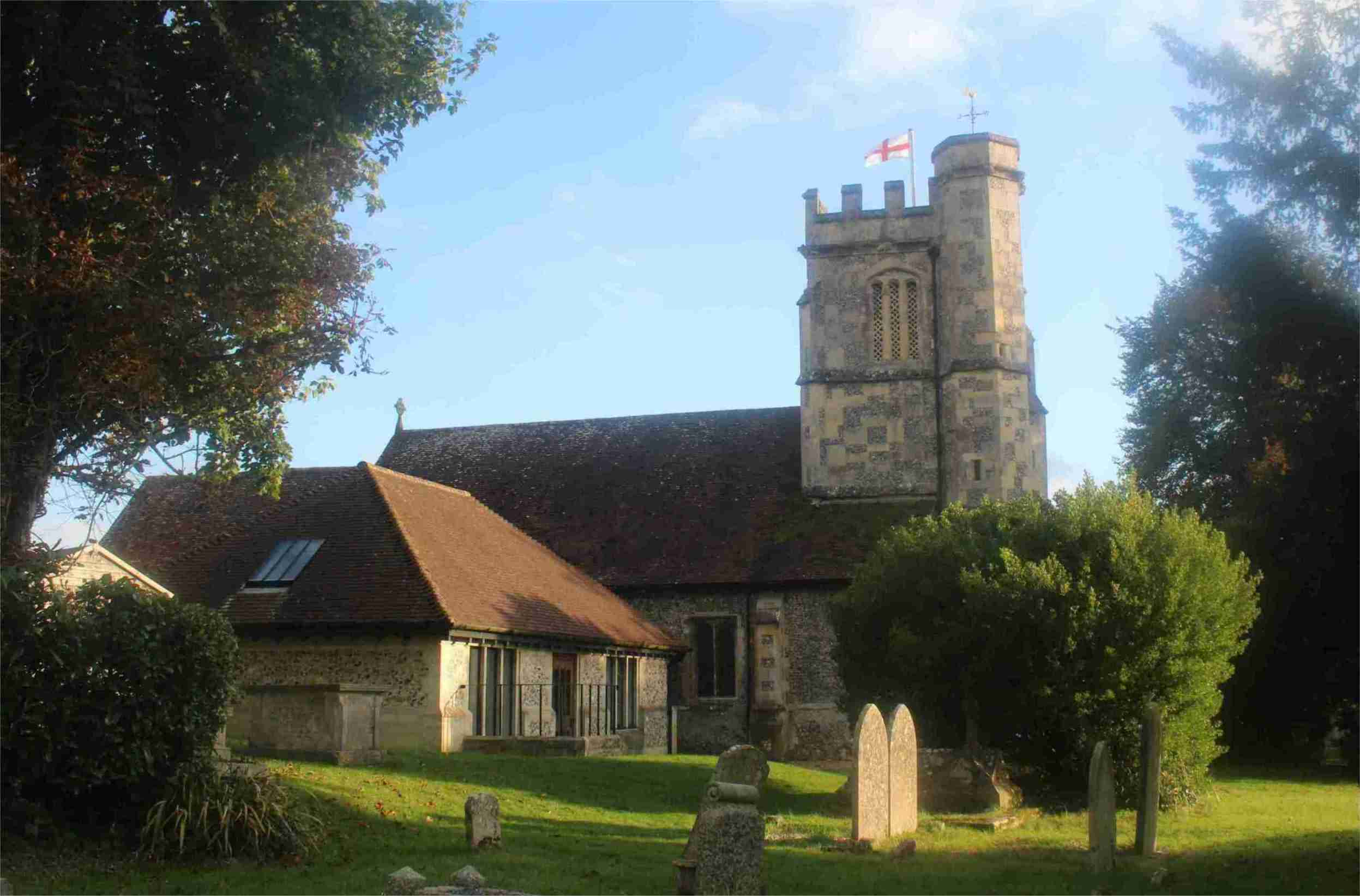
Soberton Church

Key features of Soberton include the War Memorial at its centre, the early 16th-century Church of St Peter and St Paul, and The White Lion, a 17th-century public house. The church is part of one of the largest parishes in the United Kingdom.

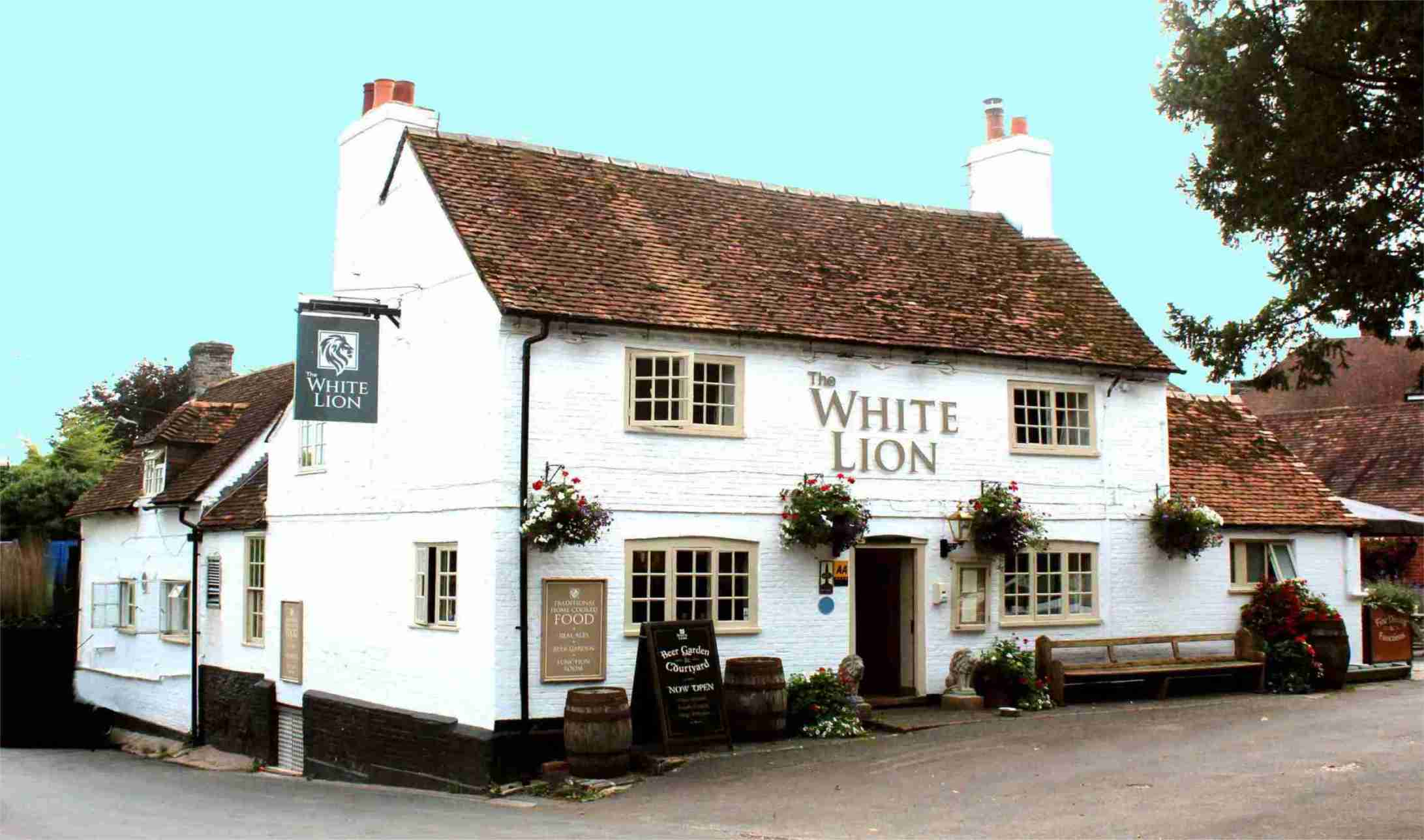
Soberton White Lion

The village was part of a smuggling route during the 18th century, and a vault beneath the church was used for the storage of contraband.

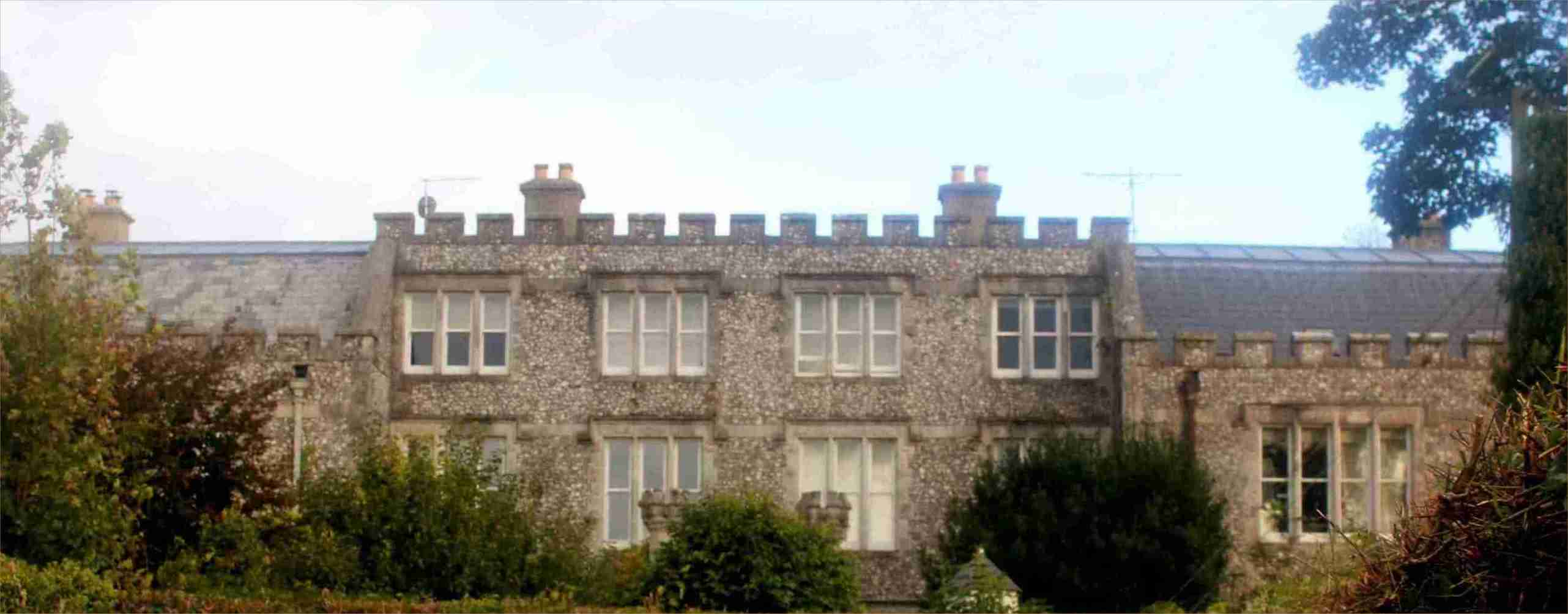
Soberton Towers from the West

North of the church is a large Georgian manor house, Soberton Towers. This was taken over by the Navy during the 1939-45 war and was used for accommodation for members of the Women's Royal Naval Service (WRENS) until 1971.

Soberton is named in the 18th century peerage of Admiral Sir George Anson (1697-1762) "Baron Anson of Soberton".

The children's writer Barbara Euphan Todd was brought up in the village.
