= Algeciras campaign order of battle =

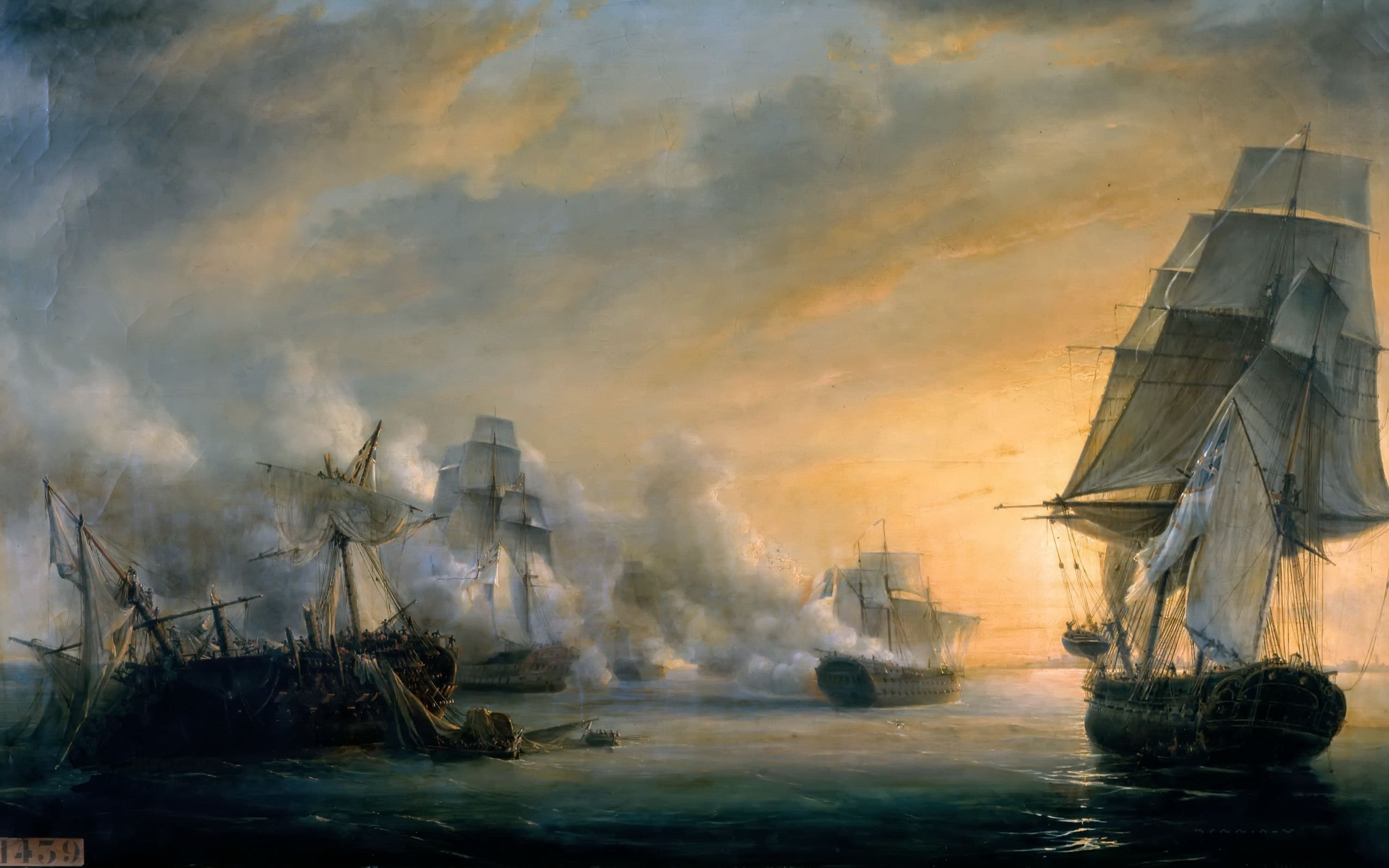
The Second Battle of Algeciras, the campaigns' second engagement

The Algeciras campaign was a brief naval campaign fought between a combined French and Spanish Navy force and a British Royal Navy force during 4–13 July 1801. A French squadron, seeking to join the Spanish fleet and a number of French ships of the line at the Spanish Atlantic base of Cádiz, sailed from Toulon on 13 June under Counter-Admiral Charles-Alexandre Léon Durand Linois. Rounding the British naval base of Gibraltar on the southern coast of Spain on 4 July, Linois learned that a British squadron under Rear-Admiral Sir James Saumarez was on station off Cádiz. Seeking to avoid battle with Saumarez's much larger force, Linois anchored in the Spanish port of Algeciras, close to Gibraltar. Saumarez discovered Linois there on 6 July and attacked at 08:30, his ships hampered by light winds and Linois's strong defensive position.

During the battle, in which the French squadron was heavily supported by fire from Spanish shore batteries and gunboats, the British ship HMS Hannibal grounded and could not be refloated. Two of the French ships were also driven ashore, but the fire of the Spanish batteries and the lack of wind all contributed to Saumarez calling off the attack at 13:35, leaving Hannibal stranded and isolated. Captain Solomon Ferris was left with no option but to surrender as the remainder of the British force limped back to Gibraltar.

Linois called on the Spanish forces in Cádiz for reinforcements and on 9 July a relief squadron was sent consisting of six ships of the line and two frigates under Vice-admiral Juan Joaquín Moreno de Mondragón. Arriving on 9 July, this force anchored in Algeciras until Linois was ready to sail on 12 July, the large combined squadron departing westwards with the wind during the evening. Saumarez followed, sending HMS Superb to attack the Spanish rearguard. During the opening stages of the second battle Superb set the 112-gun Spanish ship Real Carlos on fire and captured the French Saint Antoine. Real Carlos later drifted into the San Hermenegildo, spreading the fire to her compatriot. Both ships exploded at 00:15 on 13 July with enormous loss of life.

The British squadron pressed on with the attack, and at 05:15 on 13 July HMS Venerable and HMS Thames attacked the French Formidable off the Spanish coast. In a fierce engagement, Formidable brought down Venerable's masts and drove the ship on shore, the French ship escaping with the rest of the squadron to Cádiz. Venerable was later salvaged and returned to Gibraltar, while Saumarez reinstated the British blockade of Cádiz.

== First Battle of Algeciras ==
=== British squadron ===
The British squadron was formed from the force enforcing the Cádiz blockade to ensure that the Spanish fleet stationed there did not put to sea. One ship from the squadron was absent during the battle; HMS Superb had been detached to the Guadalquivir River and, along with the frigate HMS Thames, did not reach Algeciras in time to participate, turning back to Cádiz on 6 July and observing the later movements of the combined squadron. All of the British squadron was heavily engaged, but Hannibal and Pompée, isolated at the head of the British line by calm winds, took the heaviest damage. Pompée had to be towed to safety by the boats of the squadron and Hannibal was grounded and eventually forced to surrender. Between them Pompée and Hannibal took more than half of the total British casualties. The sloop-of-war HMS Calpe attacked the French frigate Muiron. Muiron drove off Calpe.

Rear-Admiral Saumarez's squadron
Ship	Rate	Guns	Navy	Commander	Casualties			Notes
Ship	Rate	Guns	Navy	Commander	Killed	Wounded	Total	Notes
HMS Caesar	Third rate	80	Royal Navy	Rear-Admiral Sir James Saumarez; Captain Jahleel Brenton	17	25	42	Badly damaged. The dead include seven men missing, believed drowned
HMS Pompee	Third rate	74	Royal Navy	Captain Charles Stirling	15	69	84	Very badly damaged
HMS Spencer	Third rate	74	Royal Navy	Captain Henry Darby	6	27	33	Damaged in action
HMS Venerable	Third rate	74	Royal Navy	Captain Samuel Hood	8	25	33	Damaged in action
HMS Hannibal	Third rate	74	Royal Navy	Captain Solomon Ferris	81	61	142	Ship was very badly damaged, dismasted, grounded and captured. Later became French ship Annibal. The dead include six men missing, believed drowned.
HMS Audacious	Third rate	74	Royal Navy	Captain Shuldham Peard	8	32	40	Damaged in action
HMS Calpe	Brig	14	Royal Navy	Commander George Dundas	0	0	0	
Louisa	Brig	14	Hired	Lieutenant William Truscott	0	0	0	
Total casualties: 135 killed, 239 wounded, 374 total
Source: James, pp. 113–113, Clowes, pp. 460–464, Musteen, pp. 35–41 "No. 15391". The London Gazette. 28 July 1801. pp. 930–931.

=== French squadron ===
Linois's squadron was well defended, situated in a strong position and covered by Spanish forts and gunboats augmented by shore parties from the French ships, which were carrying more than 1,500 French soldiers. The ships of the line were all heavily engaged, with Desaix and Indomptable driven ashore and Formidable also badly damaged. All three required extensive repairs before they were seaworthy. Murion was close inshore and thus only lightly damaged, but the Spanish batteries, gunboats and the town of Algeciras itself all suffered severe damage.

Counter-admiral Linois's squadron
Ship	Rate	Guns	Navy	Commander	Casualties			Notes
Ship	Rate	Guns	Navy	Commander	Killed	Wounded	Total	Notes
Formidable	Third rate	80	French Navy	Counter-admiral Charles-Alexandre Léon Durand Linois; Captain Laindet Lalonde †	48	179	227	Badly damaged
Desaix	Third rate	74	French Navy	Captain Christy de la Pallière	41	40	81	Badly damaged and driven ashore
Indomptable	Third rate	80	French Navy	Captain Augustin Moncousu †	63	97	160	Badly damaged and driven ashore
Muiron	Fifth rate	40	French Navy	Captain Jules-François Martinencq	9	8	17	Lightly damaged
Spanish defences
The Spanish garrison of Algeciras provided 14 large gunboats and defensive positions at Bateria de San Iago (five cannon), Isla Verda (seven cannon), Fort Santa Garcia, Torre de la Vila Veija and Torre de Almirante. During the battle the batteries and forts were badly damaged, five gunboats were destroyed and eleven men were killed. The number of wounded was not reported.
Total casualties: 172 killed, c. 324 wounded, c. 496 total
Source: James, pp. 113–113, Clowes, pp. 460–464, Musteen, pp. 35–41

1. Note A: Reports of French casualties vary widely. James and Clowes quote French reports of 306 killed and 280 wounded in total and Spanish reports that the French suffered 500 wounded. However in his breakdown of French casualties ship by ship, Musteen only records 161 killed and 324 wounded. The latter totals, as more detailed, are used in this table.

== Second Battle of Algeciras ==
=== British squadron ===
Saumarez's squadron was all suffering from the effects of the first battle, especially Caesar which had had its masts replaced in just four days. Pompée was so badly damaged that Saumarez abandoned the ship in the Gibraltar dockyards and redistributed the crew throughout the squadron. The only fresh ships were Superb and Thames, which had rejoined the squadron on 10 July after shadowing the combined squadron's approach to Algeciras. In the battle, only Superb, Venerable and Thames were engaged, the other ships trailing too far behind the combined squadron to play an active role in the combat, although their presence did discourage Moreno from continuing the battle on the morning of 13 July.

Rear-Admiral Saumarez's squadron
Ship	Rate	Guns	Navy	Commander	Casualties			Notes
Ship	Rate	Guns	Navy	Commander	Killed	Wounded	Total	Notes
HMS Caesar	Third rate	80	Royal Navy	Rear-Admiral Sir James Saumarez; Captain Jahleel Brenton	0	0	0	Not actively engaged in combat
HMS Superb	Third rate	74	Royal Navy	Captain Richard Goodwin Keats	0	14	14	Heavily engaged, lightly damaged
HMS Spencer	Third rate	74	Royal Navy	Captain Henry Darby	0	0	0	Not actively engaged in combat
HMS Venerable	Third rate	74	Royal Navy	Captain Samuel Hood	18	87	105	Heavily engaged, badly damaged and driven ashore
HMS Audacious	Third rate	74	Royal Navy	Captain Shuldham Peard	0	0	0	Not actively engaged in combat
HMS Thames	Frigate	32	Royal Navy	Captain Aiskew Hollis	0	0	0	Heavily engaged, undamaged
Carlotta	Frigate	48	Portuguese Navy	Captain Crawfurd Duncan	0	0	0	Portuguese ship. Not actively engaged in combat
HMS Calpe	Brig	14	Royal Navy	Commander George Dundas	0	0	0	Not actively engaged in combat
Louisa	Brig	14	Hired	Lieutenant William Truscott	0	0	0	Not actively engaged in combat
Total casualties: 18 killed, 101 wounded, 119 total
Source: James, pp. 126–131, Clowes, pp. 466–470, Musteen, pp. 48–50 "No. 15392". The London Gazette. 3 August 1801. pp. 945–946.

=== French and Spanish squadron ===
The combined squadron was formed on 9 July by the merger of Linois's battered force at Algeciras and Moreno's relief force. It totaled five Spanish ships of the line and four French and was much larger than its British opponent. However, all of Linois's ships were badly damaged from the first battle and the captured Hannibal was so battered that Moreno ordered it to return to Algeciras with the frigate Indienne on 12 July. Neither took any part in the battle. Much of the combined squadron was not engaged in the second battle, managing to escape Saumarez's pursuit and reach Cádiz safely. The rearguard of Rear Carlos, San Hermengildo and Saint Antoine was overwhelmed in the night however and Formidable only escaped after a fierce engagement on the Spanish coast the following morning.

Vice-Admiral Moreno's squadron
Ship	Rate	Guns	Navy	Commander	Casualties	Notes
Real Carlos	First rate	112	Spain	Captain Don J. Esquerra	~850 killed	Blown up in combat with heavy loss of life
San Hermenegildo	First rate	112	Spain	Captain Don J. Emparran	~850 killed	Blown up in combat with heavy loss of life
San Fernando	Second rate	96	Spain	Captain Don J. Malina	None	Not engaged in combat
Argonauta	Third rate	80	Spain	Captain Don J. Herrera	None	Not engaged in combat
San Agustín	Third rate	74	Spain	Captain Don R. Jopete	None	Not engaged in combat
Formidable	Third rate	80	France	Captain Amable-Gilles Troude	20 killed	Heavily damaged
Desaix	Third rate	74	France	Captain Christy de la Pallière	None	Not engaged in combat
Indomptable	Third rate	80	France	Captain Claude Touffet	None	Not engaged in combat
Saint Antoine	Third rate	74	France	Commodore Julien Le Ray	Heavy	Captured and later became HMS San Antonio
Santa Sabina	Frigate	34	Spain	Vice-admiral Juan Joaquín Moreno de Mondragón; Counter-admiral Charles Linois	1 killed 5 wounded	Lightly damaged
Muiron	Frigate	40	France	Captain Jules-François Martinencq	None	Not engaged in combat
Libre	Frigate	40	France	Captain Proteau	None	Not engaged in combat
Vautour	Lugger	14	France	Lieutenant Kémel	None	Not engaged in combat
Perla	Frigate	34	Spain		Unknown	Not part of Moreno's squadron. Badly damaged and later foundered
Total casualties: c. 2,000
Source: James, pp. 126–131, Clowes, pp. 466–470, Musteen, pp. 48–50

1. Note B: The captain of Perla is not named in published sources. No sources make clear at what point or why the frigate, which had not sailed from Cádiz with Moreno's squadron, entered the battle or suffered the fatal damage.

== Bibliography ==
- Clowes, William Laird (1997) [1900]. The Royal Navy, A History from the Earliest Times to 1900, Volume IV. London: Chatham Publishing. ISBN 1-86176-013-2.
- Gardiner, Robert (2001) [1996]. Nelson Against Napoleon. Caxton Editions. ISBN 1-86176-026-4.
- James, William (2002) [1827]. The Naval History of Great Britain, Volume 3, 1800–1805. London: Conway Maritime Press. ISBN 0-85177-907-7.
- Mostert, Noel (2007). The Line upon a Wind: The Greatest War Fought at Sea Under Sail 1793–1815. Vintage Books. ISBN 978-0-7126-0927-2.
- Musteen, Jason R. (2011). Nelson's Refuge: Gibraltar in the Age of Napoleon. Naval Institute Press. ISBN 978-1-59114-545-5.
- Woodman, Richard (2001). The Sea Warriors. Constable Publishers. ISBN 1-84119-183-3.
