= Second Battle of Algeciras =

1801 battle of the Algeciras campaign

- Part of the Algeciras campaign
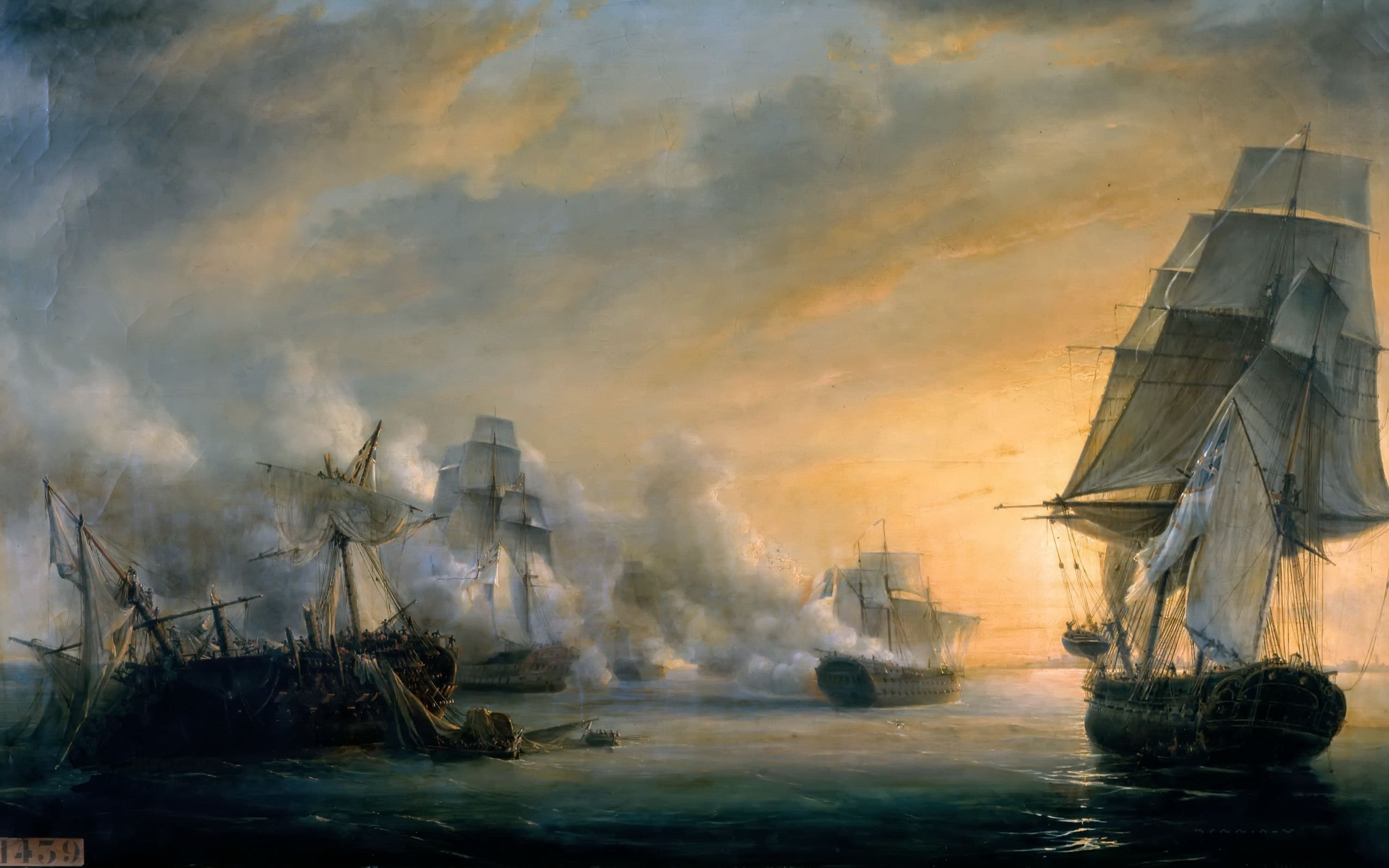
- 1832 painting of the battle
Date	12–13 July 1801
Location	Strait of Gibraltar, Mediterranean Sea 36.0°N 5.5°W
Result	Anglo-Portuguese victory

Belligerents
United Kingdom; Portugal	Spain; France

Commanders and leaders
(United Kingdom of Great Britain and Ireland) Sir James Saumarez	(Spain) Juan de Mondragón (First French Empire) Charles-Alexandre Linois

Strength
6 ships of the line 2 frigates (OOB)	9 ships of the line 3 frigates (OOB)

Casualties and losses
18 killed 101 wounded	2,000 killed or wounded 500 captured 2 ships of the line destroyed 1 ship of the line captured 1 frigate sunk

The Second Battle of Algeciras (also known as the Battle of the Gut of Gibraltar) was fought on 12 July 1801 between a Royal Navy squadron and a larger Spanish and French squadron in the Gut of Gibraltar during the Algeciras campaign of the war of the Second Coalition. The battle followed the First Battle of Algeciras on 6 July, in which a French squadron anchored at the Spanish port of Algeciras was attacked by a larger British squadron based at nearby Gibraltar. In a heavy engagement fought in calm weather in the close confines of Algeciras Bay, the British force had been becalmed and battered, suffering heavy casualties and losing the 74-gun ship HMS Hannibal. Retiring for repairs, both sides called up reinforcements, the French receiving support first, from the Spanish fleet based at Cádiz, which sent six ships of the line to escort the French squadron to safety.

Arriving at Algeciras on 9 July, the combined squadron was ready to sail again on 12 July, departing Algeciras to the westwards during the evening. The British squadron under Rear-Admiral Sir James Saumarez, having effected its own hasty repairs, set off in pursuit. Finding that his ships were falling behind, Saumarez instructed his captains to separate and attack the combined squadron as best they were able to. The fastest ship was HMS Superb under Captain Richard Goodwin Keats, which sailed through the Spanish rearguard as a moonless night fell. Superb fired on the rearmost ships, setting the 112-gun Real Carlos on fire and capturing the Saint Antoine. Unable to determine friend from foe in the darkness, Real Carlos inadvertently engaged the Spanish ship San Hermenegildo, spreading the fire to its compatriot. Both ships subsequently exploded with enormous loss of life. A second stage of the battle then developed, as HMS Venerable took the lead of the British line, attacking the rearmost French ship Formidable under Captain Amable Troude. In a furious and protracted engagement, Venerable suffered heavy damage and was driven ashore, allowing the remainder of the French force to return to Cádiz without further fighting.

After the battle, Venerable was towed back to Gibraltar for repairs, while the rest of the British squadron resumed the blockade of the French and Spanish ships in Cádiz, returning the situation to that before the battle. This British victory, coming so soon after Saumarez's defeat in Algeciras harbour, did much to restore parity in the region and the heavy casualties inflicted on the Spanish contributed to a weakening of the Franco-Spanish alliance and the signing of the Treaty of Amiens, which brought the war to a temporary halt early the following year. In France, despite the heavy Spanish losses, the battle was celebrated as a victory, with Troude widely praised and promoted for the defence of his ship.

== Background ==
=== First battle of Algeciras ===
In August 1798, the French Mediterranean Fleet was largely destroyed by a British fleet at the Battle of the Nile during the French invasion of Egypt. With the Royal Navy dominant in the Mediterranean Sea and their army trapped in Egypt, the French sought in 1801 to augment their depleted forces in the region by sending reinforcements from the Atlantic Fleet and by purchasing ships from the Spanish Navy, based in Cádiz. A squadron sailed from Brest on the Atlantic in January and made three failed attempts to reach Egypt, which was facing a large British invasion, before abandoning the effort and retiring to Toulon on the French Mediterranean coast. Three ships of the line, Formidable, Indomptable and Desaix, had been detached from the squadron in May however and were subsequently placed under the command of Contre-Admiral Charles Linois under orders to sail for Cádiz. At Cádiz, the Spanish fleet had agreed to sell six ships of the line to the French Navy, and on 13 June two French frigates, Libre and Indienne, arrived at the port to oversee the transfer under the command of Contre-Admiral Dumanoir le Pelley.

En route to Cádiz, Linois had learned from the crew of the captured brig HMS Speedy that a powerful British squadron of seven ships of the line under Rear-Admiral Sir James Saumarez lay off Cádiz, blockading the port. Concerned that this squadron could overwhelm his own, Linois took shelter in the small but well-defended harbour of Algeciras, just across Algeciras Bay from the heavily fortified British naval base at Gibraltar. Saumarez was informed of Linois's arrival, and turned eastwards to confront him, discovering the French ships anchored in a well prepared position on the morning of 6 July. Saumarez attacked immediately, but found that his ships were hampered by a lack of wind. Becalmed under heavy fire, the British squadron inflicted severe damage on the French ships which withdrew into shallower water, two grounding. However, when Saumarez ordered his ships to follow, HMS Hannibal grounded as well, trapped under a heavy barrage from the shore. With no wind with which to manoeuvre and the squadron's boats all either sunk or engaged in towing the battered HMS Pompée back to Gibraltar, Saumarez called off the attack at 13:35. The battered British squadron retired to Gibraltar, except for Hannibal, which was trapped, battered and swiftly forced to surrender, having lost two masts and more than 140 men.

=== Passage of Moreno ===
With both squadrons badly damaged, reinforcements were called for, Linois sending a messenger overland to Cádiz with an appeal for the Spanish fleet there, under Admiral Jose de Mazarredo y Salazar to send a squadron to escort the French force in Algeciras to the safety of Cádiz. At Cádiz, le Pelley had to plead with Mazzaredo for assistance, the Spanish admiral agreeing on 8 July to send a powerful squadron under Vice-Admiral Juan Joaquín Moreno de Mondragón to Algeciras. Moreno's force consisted of two 112-gun first rate ships of the line, Real Carlos and San Hermenegildo, the 96-gun San Fernando, 80-gun Argonauta and the 74-gun San Agustín. With this force was the 74-gun French ship Saint Antoine, which a few days earlier had been the Spanish San Antonio. Saint Antoine was the first of the French ships purchased from the Spanish Navy to enter service, the crew drawn from the crews of le Pelley's frigates supplemented by Spanish sailors and commanded by Commodore Julien le Ray. With the squadron were the frigates Libre, Indienne and the Spanish Sabina as well as the French lugger Vautour.

The combined squadron sailed from Cádiz on 9 July, progressing rapidly southwards and reaching Algeciras Bay late in the afternoon, except for Saint Antoine which was delayed and arrived the following morning. The force was anchored close to Algeciras, well out of range of cannon at Gibraltar, and there waited for Linois to finish making the necessary repairs to his ships. Shadowing the combined squadron was a small British force under Captain Richard Goodwin Keats on HMS Superb with the frigate HMS Thames and the brig HMS Pasley. Although part of Saumarez's squadron, Keats had been too late to take part in the first battle, and had instead cruised off Cádiz watching the Spanish fleet there. When Moreno sailed, Keats was initially chased by portions of the Franco-Spanish squadron, but eluded and followed them, subsequently joining Saumarez at Gibraltar. At the British port, the dockyards were the scene of frantic activity as Saumarez, supported by commissioner Captain Alexander Ball, sought to repair his squadron so that it could intercept Moreno's forces on their voyage back to Cádiz. Pompée was temporarily abandoned in the yard, her crew redistributed to work on the rest of the squadron. Saumarez also gave orders that his flagship, HMS Caesar, was also to be left at Gibraltar, but Captain Jahleel Brenton requested the opportunity to repair his ship and Saumarez relented, the crew of Caesar working all day and in shifts throughout the night in order to bring their ship up to fighting standard. Saumarez believed however that due to the condition of Linois's ships and the mistaken assumption that the combined squadron would sail for Cartagena to the east, he would have at least two weeks to prepare and sent messages to the Mediterranean Fleet under Lord Keith, then at sea off Egypt, requesting support against the combined squadron.

== Battle ==
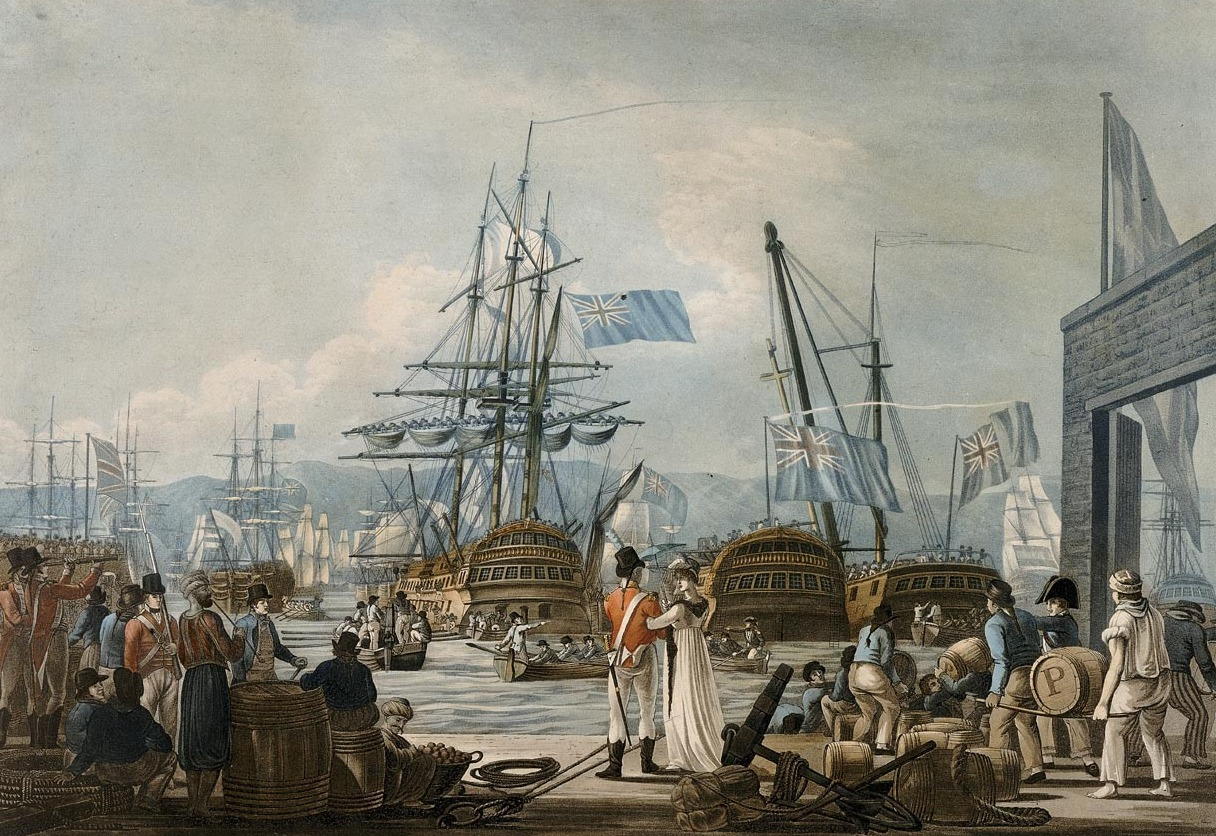
Saumarez's fleet preparing to set sail from Gibraltar on 12 July 1801

On 11 July the activity on Moreno's ships indicated to British observers at Gibraltar that the combined squadron was readying for sea, and the British working parties repairing Saumarez's squadron correspondingly redoubled their efforts. The arrival of a light easterly wind which would favour passage back to Cádiz encouraged both Moreno and Saumarez to prepare for departure to the Atlantic base on the following day. At 12:00 on 12 July, Caesar warped out of Gibraltar dockyard with her band playing the popular song "Heart of Oak" to the answering strains of "Britons, Strike Home!" from the dockside as crowds again turned out in their thousands to watch the coming battle. By that time however, Moreno's forces were already at sea: at dawn on 12 July the leading Spanish ships loosed their sails and by 12:00 the French and Spanish squadron had begun to gather at their rendezvous point off Cabrita Point at the mouth of Algeciras Bay. At 15:00, Saumarez set sail, his pennant flying from Caesar and followed by ships of the line Superb, HMS Spencer, HMS Venerable and HMS Audacious, frigates Thames and the Portuguese Carlotta and several smaller vessels. Both Saumarez and Linois expected reinforcements sent by Lord Keith to arrive during the day, but none appeared.

At 19:00, delayed by the effect of the Rock of Gibraltar on the wind, the British squadron rounded Gibraltar and found the French and Spanish ships still assembling at Cabrita Point. The light wind prevented any rapid movement, and Saumarez began to slowly tack towards the combined squadron in line of battle formation. Moreno's departure had been delayed due to the state of the captured Hannibal, renamed Annibal, which was unable to make any progress under its jury masts and had been taken under tow by the frigate Indienne. Sighting Saumarez's force, Moreno instructed Indienne and Hannibal to return to Algeciras and at 19:45 issued orders for the remainder of the squadron to sail west through the Gut of Gibraltar towards Cádiz. He also, following Spanish naval tradition, disembarked his flagship Real Carlos and transferred to the frigate Sabina, persuading Linois to quit Formidable and do the same.

=== Superb and the rearguard ===
". . . the Spanish ships Real Carlos, 112, and San Hermenegildo, 112, mistaking each other for the aggressor, began a mutual attack, resulting in the Real Carlos losing her foretopmast, the sails of which – falling over her own guns – caught fire. While in this condition the Hermenegildo – still engaging the Real Carlos as an enemy – in the confusion fell on board her and caught fire also. Both ships burned until they blew up."
Commander Lord Cochrane, Witness of the battle from Gibraltar.

At 20:00, Saumarez led his ships into the Gut after the combined squadron, but in the gathering dusk Moreno's squadron was already out of sight and the British admiral realised that his ships were too slow to catch the French and Spanish ships in their current formation before they reached the comparative safety of the open ocean. At 20:40, with the wind picking up, he therefore instructed the squadron to break formation and attack the rear of the combined squadron, directing his orders at Keats in Superb, whose ship was the fastest. Keats immediately set all sail. The wind soon freshened to a hard gale in the Straits and with foresail and top-gallants set the Superb went at 11 1/2 knots and by 22:00 had regained sight of the combined squadron's rearguard, which consisted of the 112-gun ships and the Saint Antoine. Behind, all Keats could see was Caesar and Venerable in the distance, and by 23:00 only Caesar was still in sight, more than 3 nautical miles (5.6 km) behind Superb.

Although he was now facing considerable odds, Keats steered Superb to within 350 yards (320 m) of the Real Carlos. She poured three successive broadsides into the Spanish before fire was returned, so unexpected was the attack. By 23:20, Keats was coming under fire from all three vessels of the Franco-Spanish rearguard, although evading much of it by the simple tactic of not illuminating his ship so that the ships of the combined squadron fired on one another more than on their British opponent. Linois had also ordered his ships to extinguish their lights, but this only added to the confusion of the Spanish ships in the squadron. The moon had set and the night was quite dark, which contributed to the ineffectiveness of the Spanish gunnery. Real Carlos fired randomly at the British ship but failed to strike it once during the brief engagement. Keats's ship was much more accurate however, firing three broadsides before Superb was carried beyond Real Carlos and towards Saint Antoine. The British broadsides caused severe damage, knocking away the foretopmast and causing a fire to break out on the Spanish ship's deck following the third broadside. The fire grew rapidly and soon was so fierce that it could be plainly seen by observers at Gibraltar.

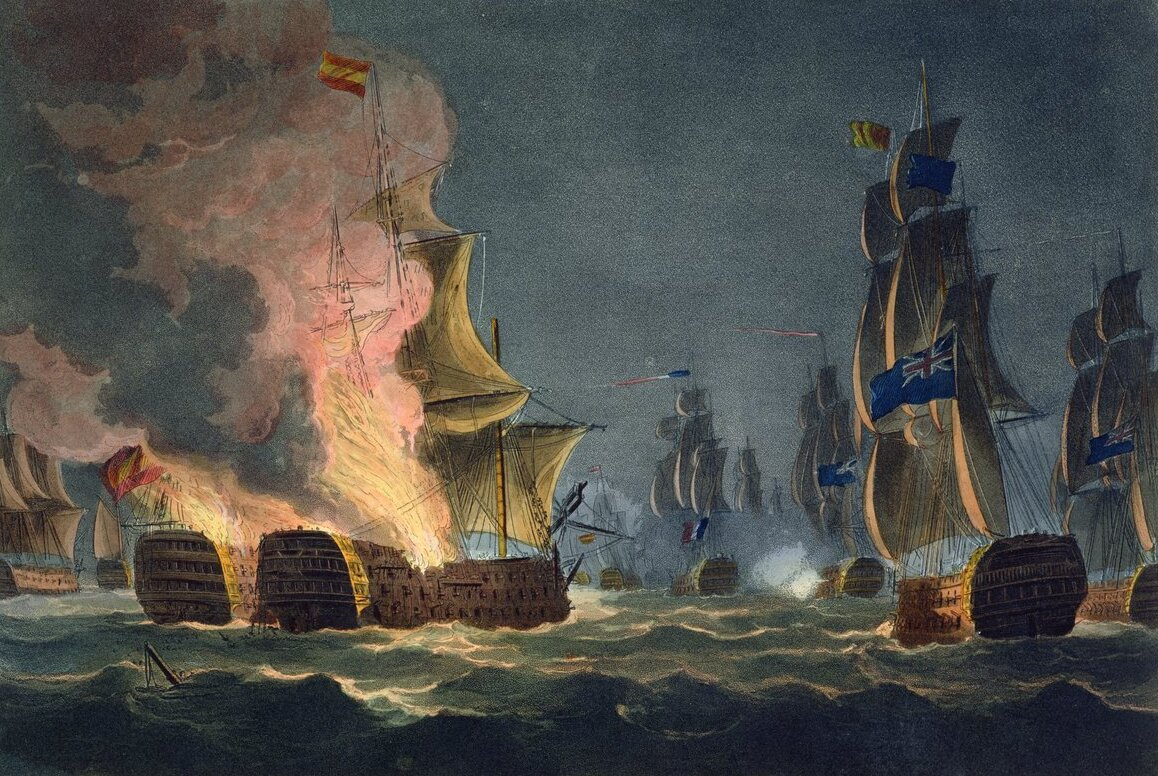
San Hermenegildo and Real Carlos on fire after mistakenly firing on one other

With Real Carlos disabled, Keats pushed on into combat with Saint Antoine, the combined French and Spanish crew engaging the British vessel as it approached. At 23:50, Keats laid his ship close alongside the new French ship, beginning a close and heated action as the ships of the line exchanged broadsides with one another in pitch darkness and with an increasing wind. For 30 minutes the battle continued until, with the ships off Cape Spartel in North Africa, a wounded Le Ray decided that his ship was no longer able to contest the action and hailed Superb to announce that he had surrendered. The halyards that held up his pennant had however become tangled in the rigging, giving the appearance that the ship was still in French hands: this later led it to be attacked repeatedly by other British ships as they came up during the night. Formidable was also to the rear of the combined squadron, escaping attack by feigning British signal lights until it had safely passed the battle between Superb and Saint Antoine. Keats remained with his prize, awaiting the arrival of the rest of the squadron: Caesar, Venerable, Spencer and Thames arrived after midnight, all firing on Saint Antoine as they passed before continuing westwards in search of the remainder of Moreno's squadron. Superb was later joined by Carlotta and the small ships HMS Calpe and Louisa, which remained on hand during the night.

To the east of the fighting between Superb and Saint Antoine, the fire on Real Carlos blazed out of control, spreading throughout the ship. In the darkness, the blazing vessel stood out and was mistaken by the crew of San Hermenegildo for a British ship. Despite specific orders from Moreno for his captains to be sure of their targets, San Hermenegildo closed with the burning ship and fired several broadsides into Real Carlos. The attack prompted a response and the two huge warships began a close exchange of fire that was only brought to a close when Real Carlos drifted into San Hermenegildo, the flames spreading from the former's sails to the latter. Saumarez, on witnessing the sight, excitedly exclaimed to Brenton "My God sir, look there! The day is ours!" Within minutes both ships were tangled together, fire spreading unchecked throughout the vessels. The fire was too dangerous for British ships to make any rescue attempts, and although several hundred men managed to escape the wrecks on small boats, there were still more than 1,700 sailors on board when first the Real Carlos at 00:15 and then the San Hermenegildo at 01:00 exploded as the flames reached their central magazines, killing both crews. 262 survivors in boats were taken aboard the captured Saint Antoine and 38 on Superb, while a handful managed to reach the rest of the Franco-Spanish squadron, but the enormous loss of life in this incident (including both their commanders José de Ezquerra y Guirior and Manuel Antonio de Emparan y Orbe) was one of the worst maritime disasters up to that date.

=== Venerable and Formidable ===
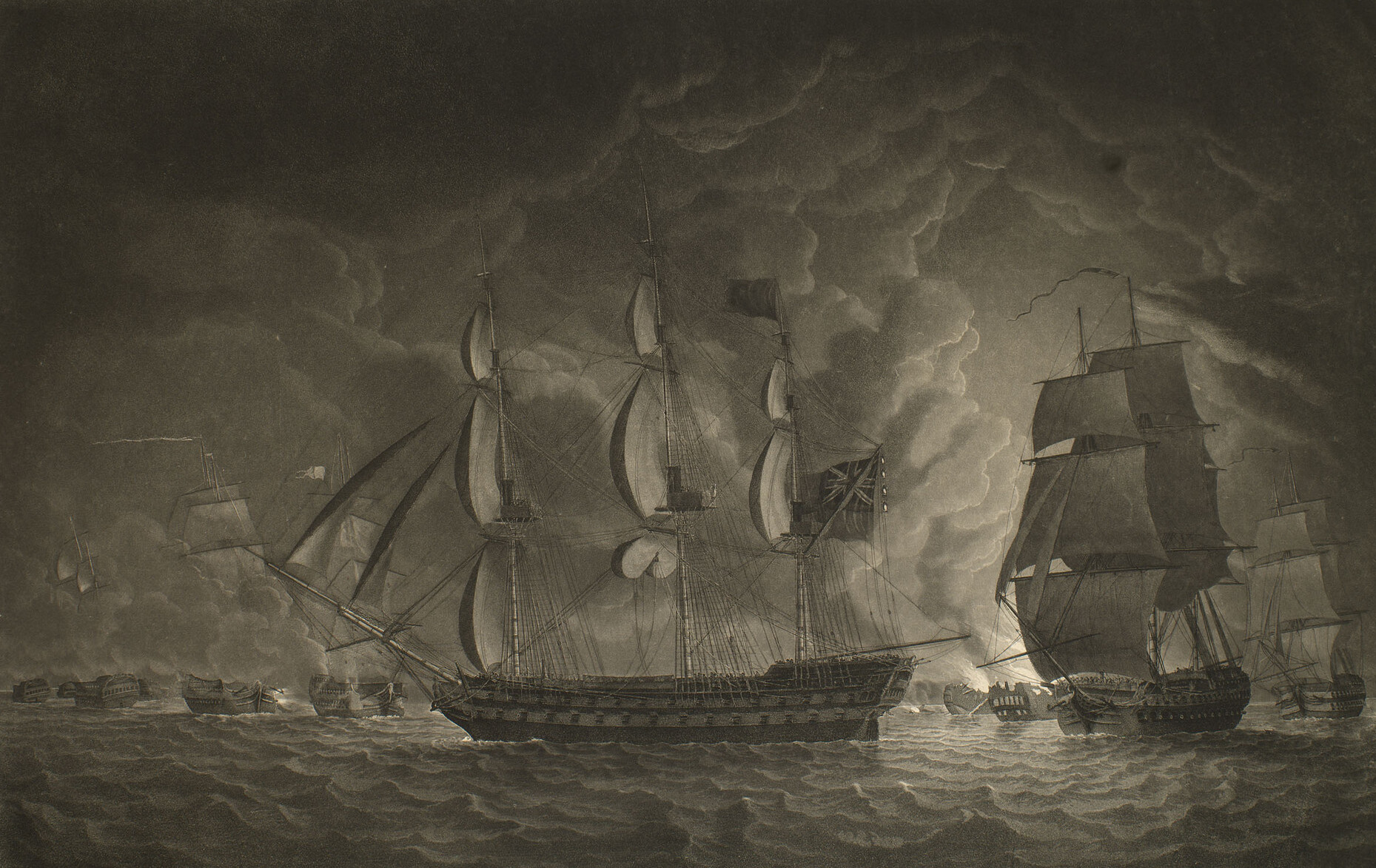
Engraving of the late stages of the battle by Robert Dodd

While Keats had remained with his prize, Saumarez had led the remainder of the squadron forward, although Audacious had been left far behind the rest of the British force. The French and Spanish ships had scattered as Superb attacked the rearguard and during the night each made their way separately to the rendezvous off Cádiz harbour. As dawn broke at 04:00 on 13 July, lookouts on the leading British ship of the line Venerable under Captain Samuel Hood spotted the French ship Formidable, under the command of Captain Amable Troude in the absence of Linois, to the north. Formidable was trailing the rest of the squadron, close to the shore in Conil Bay to the south of Cádiz and north of Cape Trafalgar. The wind was light and coming from the land and so Caesar and Spencer, the latter being a long way behind the others, were unable to approach the French ship and it was left to Venerable and Thames, both inshore and therefore better able to make use of the wind, to lead the attack.

Formidable had only jury topmasts following the battle on 6 July, and so Hood was able to rapidly approach the French ship, coming under fire from Troude's stern guns at 05:15, Hood holding off from replying until 05:20 so as to not delay his progress. The light breeze was at that point in Hood's favour, and Venerable was able to come close alongside Formidable and open fire with a full broadside. Off Cádiz, the remnants of Moreno's squadron formed up with the intention of sailing to Formidable's aid, but were struck by a calm and could only watch the battle to the south.

Venerable took the worst of the early action and at 05:30 the mizzen topmast was shot away. Hood responded by ordering Captain Aiskew Hollis in Thames to approach Troude's stern, the frigate repeatedly raking the French ship under fire from the ineffective stern guns. For another hour the ships traded broadsides, until at 06:45 the mainmast of Venerable collapsed over the side, significantly retarding the ship's movement. Formidable was able to pull ahead slowly in the light and unreliable winds, continuing to fire the stern guns at the now immobile British ship. Venerable was now drifting out of control, the foremast collapsing at 07:50 as the ship grounded on the shoals at Sancti Petri, 12 miles (19 km) south of Cádiz. With his main opponent disabled, Troude continued slowly towards Cádiz, out of range of the approaching Caesar.

Saumarez sent Jahleel Brenton in a gig to Venerable at 08:00, just as the foremast also fell overboard, with instructions that if the combined French and Spanish squadron, visible off Cádiz, should proceed south to attack the grounded British vessel then Hood should remove his crew and set his ship on fire. Thames was brought close alongside in order to evacuate the ship if the need arose, but Hood refused the order and insisted that he would be able to save his ship. Eventually the arrival of Audacious and Superb on the southern horizon decided the issue as Moreno abandoned any intention to counterattack, instead entering Cádiz harbour with his squadron, followed by Troude in Formidable. Their arrival was greeted with cheers from the city's population, unaware of the disaster in the Gut of Gibraltar. The confusion meant that the situations of the lost ships were unknown, and Saint Antoine's arrival was still anticipated at Cádiz as late as 16 July.

== Aftermath ==
=== Casualties ===
With the immediate threat gone, Saumarez was able to direct his squadron's efforts to salvaging the battered and grounded Venerable. The calm sea and light winds aided this operation, and at 14:00, assisted by Thames and the boats of Caesar and Spencer, Venerable was once again afloat. Hood's ship was taken under tow by first Thames and then Spencer, the British squadron turning back towards Gibraltar at 18:00, the crew rigging a series of jury masts and sails to assist the process. By 08:00 on 14 July, Venerable was again able to sail independently, the squadron arriving at Gibraltar later that day. At Gibraltar the returning squadron was greeted with cheers and a 21-gun salute. Spencer, Audacious and Thames remained at sea off Cádiz to continue the blockade, which remained in place until the end of the French Revolutionary Wars in March 1802 at the Peace of Amiens.

British casualties had been relatively light, incurred almost entirely on Venerable, which suffered 18 killed and 87 wounded. Superb had 15 men wounded including a lieutenant, all from the action with Saint Antoine, while the only other ship directly engaged was Thames, which hadn't lost a single man either killed or wounded. Apart from Venerable none of the other ships had suffered any significant damage, including Superb and Thames. In the aftermath of the battle, Saumarez arranged a prisoner exchange, the crew of Saint Antoine sent into Algeciras in return for the release of the crew of Hannibal. Losses among the combined squadron were drastically heavier: Formidable reported 20 killed and an unreported number of wounded and Saint Antoine's casualties were not reported at the time but were considered by later historians such as William James to "have been very severe". By far the biggest loss however was on board the two destroyed 112-gun ships, each of which had had a crew of roughly 1,000 men from which just over 300 are known to have escaped to other ships. The loss of more than 1,700 Spanish sailors in the battle was one of the most severe losses of life in a single maritime incident to that time.

Finally, there was damage to two Spanish frigates: the Sabina was struck by cannon fire during the night, killing one man and wounding five, although it was not determined which ship had fired on the flagship and James suggested that it may have been from one of the destroyed 112-gun ships in a case of friendly fire. In addition, the Spanish 34-gun frigate Perla was seen wallowing off the North African coast of the Strait of Gibraltar on the morning of 13 July, sinking later in the day due to severe damage. How Perla came to be engaged in the action has never been explained. The ship was not part of Moreno's squadron at Algeciras and none of the British ships reported engaging a frigate during the night – during the hours of darkness Perla must have encountered the battle and become caught in the cross-fire, suffering fatal damage.

=== Effects ===
In Britain the battle was celebrated, Saumarez having been deemed to have removed the stain of his defeat six days earlier in the battle in the Bay of Algeciras. He was awarded the thanks of both Houses of Parliament and, already a Knight Bachelor, made a Knight of the Bath with a pension of £1,200 annually (equivalent to £78,000 in 2025). The first lieutenants of Caesar, Superb and Venerable were promoted to commander and the captured Saint Antoine was commissioned into the Royal Navy as HMS San Antonio, although the age and small size of the ship meant that she was never suited to front-line service and was instead stationed permanently at Portsmouth. Nearly five decades later, the second battle was among the actions recognised by the Naval General Service Medal, awarded upon application to all British participants still living in 1847.

In France the battle was represented as a victory, largely based on a report sent to Paris by Dumanoir le Pelley on the strength of a letter written by Captain Troude, which claimed that he had fought not only Venerable and Thames, but also Caesar and Spencer (misidentified in the report as Superb). Troude claimed that he had not only driven all of these ships off and completely destroyed Venerable by driving the ship ashore by 07:00, but that he had then waited nearby until 10:00 in the hope of resuming the action. In reward for his services as represented, Troude was promoted and highly praised, later holding a number of important active commands in the French Navy.

The outcome of the battle, reversing the British defeat of 6 July, inflicting severe losses on the Spanish fleet at Cádiz and trapping Linois in Cádiz proved decisive in confirming British control of the Mediterranean Sea. With the French plan to reinforce the army stranded in Egypt in ruins, the British invasion fleet was free to operate without interference, succeeding in capturing the country in September. In a wider sense too, it emphasized the degree to which the Royal Navy dominated European waters, destroying any attempt by the navies of France and its allies to conduct operations at sea. In Spain the government, furious at the losses suffered for so little gain, began to distance themselves from the alliance with France, which was a contributing factor in the signing of the Treaty of Amiens in March 1802 that ended the French Revolutionary Wars. For the remainder of the war the British maintained undisputed control of the Mediterranean Sea and the Spanish coast, the Cádiz blockade preventing the French and Spanish forces there from putting to sea.

== Bibliography ==
- Adkins, Roy & Lesley (2006). The War for All the Oceans. Abacus. ISBN 978-0-349-11916-8.
- Clowes, William Laird (1997) [1900]. The Royal Navy, A History from the Earliest Times to 1900, Volume IV. London: Chatham Publishing. ISBN 1-86176-013-2.
- Gardiner, Robert, ed. (2001) [1996]. Nelson Against Napoleon. Caxton Editions. ISBN 1-86176-026-4.
- Hannah, P. (2021). Keats, A Treasure to the Service. Adelaide: Green Hill. ISBN 978-1-922629-73-9.
- James, William (2002) [1827]. The Naval History of Great Britain, Volume 3, 1800–1805. London: Conway Maritime Press. ISBN 0-85177-907-7.
- Mostert, Noel (2007). The Line upon a Wind: The Greatest War Fought at Sea Under Sail 1793–1815. Vintage Books. ISBN 978-0-7126-0927-2.
- Musteen, Jason R. (2011). Nelson's Refuge: Gibraltar in the Age of Napoleon. Naval Investiture Press. ISBN 978-1-59114-545-5.
- Rodger, N.A.M. (2004). The Command of the Ocean. Allan Lane. ISBN 0-71399-411-8.
- Woodman, Richard (2001). The Sea Warriors. Constable Publishers. ISBN 1-84119-183-3.
- Bodart, Gaston (1908). Militär-historisches Kriegs-Lexikon (1618–1905). C. W. Stern. p. 361.
