= Spanish ship San Antonio =

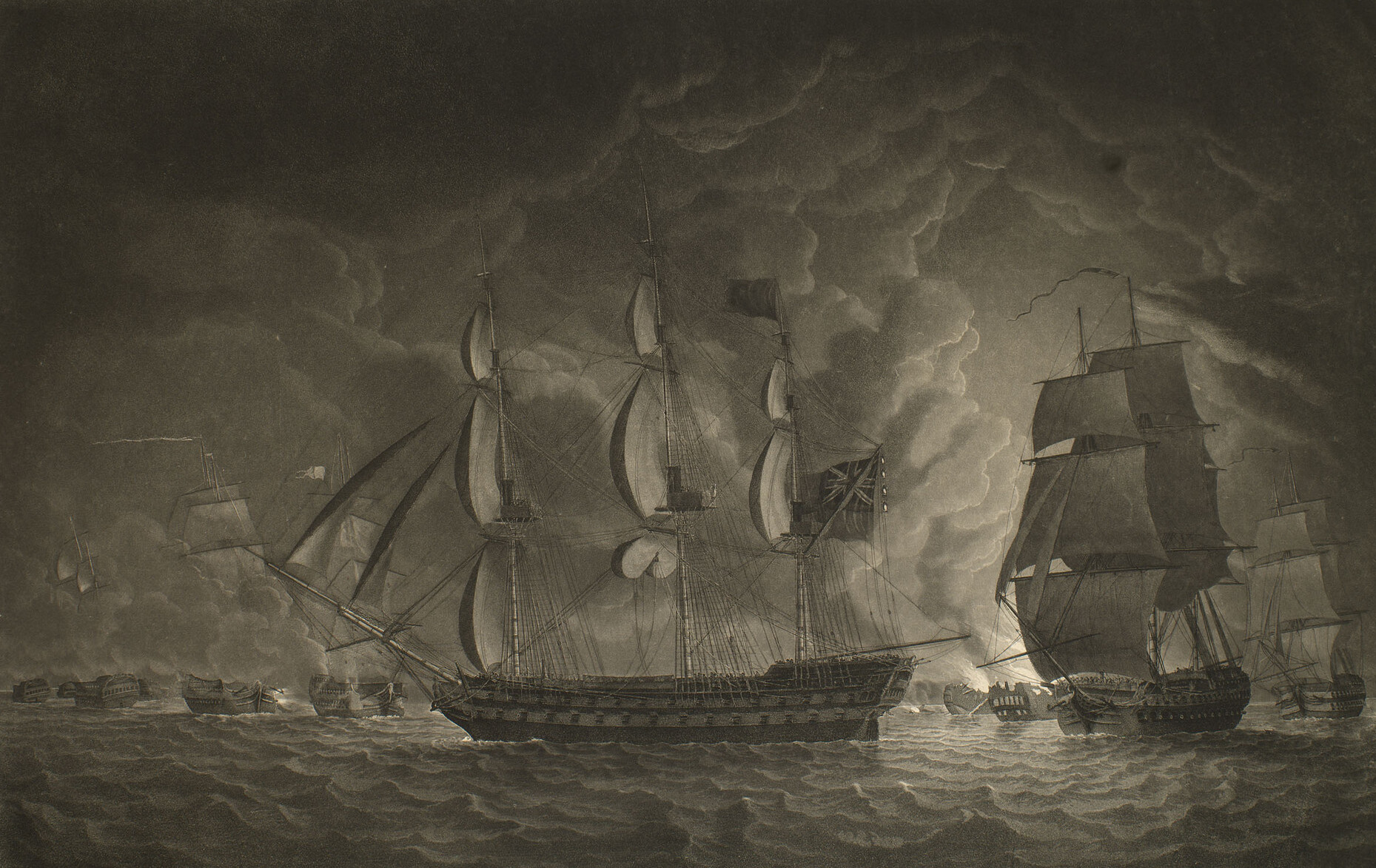
- Saint Antoine (right foreground) at the Second Battle of Algeciras

History

Spain
- Name: San Antonio
- Builder: Cartagena shipyard
- Launched: 16 July 1785
- Honours and awards: Battle of Brión; Battle of Cape St Vincent (1797)
- Fate: Sold to France, 21 May 1801

France
- Name: Saint Antoine
- Acquired: 21 May 1801
- Honours and awards: Second Battle of Algeciras
- Captured: by Britain, 13 July 1801

United Kingdom
- Name: HMS San Antonio
- Acquired: 13 July 1801
- Out of service: September 1814
- Fate: Sold 1828

General characteristics in British service
- Class & type: Third-rate ship of the line
- Tons burthen: 1,700
- Length: 53.3 m (175 ft)
- Beam: 14.6 m (48 ft)
- Sail plan: Full-rigged ship
- Complement: 590
- Armament: 28 × 32-pounder cannon; 28 × 18-pounder cannon; 6 × 9-pounder cannon; 12 × 32-pounder carronades

San Antonio was a 74-gun, two-decked, third-rate ship of the line built for the Spanish Navy and launched in Cartagena in 1785. She was present under Captain Salvador Medina at the Battle of Cape St Vincent in 1797. In August 1800 the San Antonio was at Ferrol during the Royal Navy's Ferrol Expedition failed attempt to take the town.

== French service ==
By the terms of the Third Treaty of San Ildefonso of October 1800, Spain agreed to supply France with "six ships of war in good condition built for seventy-four guns, armed and equipped and ready to receive French crews and supplies". The San Antonio was handed over in May 1801 to become the French ship Saint Antoine under Commodore Julien Le Ray, though some Spanish seamen remained aboard. Taking part in the Second Battle of Algeciras during the night of 12–13 July 1801, she was pursued by HMS Superb, Captain Keats, the combined French and Spanish crew engaging the British vessel as it approached. At 23:50 on the 12th, Keats laid his ship close alongside the new French ship, beginning a close and heated action as the ships of the line exchanged broadsides with one another in pitch darkness and with an increasing wind. For thirty minutes the battle continued until, with the ships off Cape Spartel in North Africa, a wounded Le Ray decided that his ship was no longer able to contest the action and hailed Superb to announce that he had surrendered. The halyards that held up his pennant had however become tangled in the rigging, giving the appearance that the ship was still in French hands: this later led Saint Antoine to be attacked repeatedly by other British ships as they came up during the night. Keats remained with his prize, awaiting the arrival of the rest of the squadron: Caesar, Venerable, Spencer and Thames arrived after midnight, all firing on Saint Antoine as they passed before continuing westwards in search of other enemy vessels.

== British service ==
Saint Antoine was commissioned by the Royal Navy in 1801 as the San Antonio and sailed under Captain Dundas to Portsmouth. There she was laid up for repairs and eventually commissioned as a Prison ship in October 1807, and later as a powder magazine from May to September 1814. She was sold in 1828.

== Bibliography ==
- Clowes, William Laird (1997) [1900]. The Royal Navy, A History from the Earliest Times to 1900, Volume IV. London: Chatham Publishing. ISBN 1-86176-013-2.
- James, William (2002) [1827]. The Naval History of Great Britain, Volume 3, 1800–1805. London: Conway Maritime Press. ISBN 0-85177-907-7.
- Winfield, Rif (2008). British Warships in the Age of Sail 1793–1817: Design, Construction, Careers and Fates. Seaforth Publishing. ISBN 978-1-86176-246-7.
- Winfield, Rif; Tredrea, John M.; García-Torralba Pérez, Enrique & Blasco Felip, Manuel (2023). Spanish Warships in the Age of Sail 1700—1860: Design, Construction, Careers and Fates. Seaforth Publishing. ISBN 978-1-5267-9078-1.
