= Ferrol Expedition =

British attack on Ferrol

- Part of the War of the Second Coalition
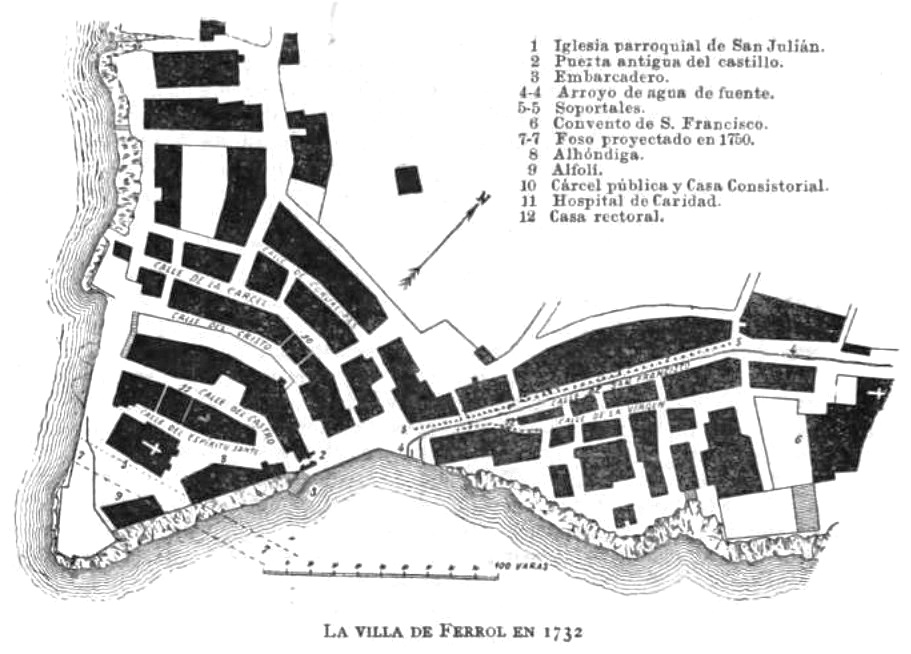
- 1732 map of Ferrol
Date	25–26 August 1800
Location	Ferrol, Spain
Result	Spanish victory

Belligerents
Spain	Great Britain

Commanders and leaders
Count Donadio; Juan de Mondragón	Sir John Borlase Warren; Sir James Pulteney; Sir Edward Pellew

Strength
4,000; 6 ships of the line	15,000; 5 ships of the line

Casualties and losses
37 killed 102 wounded	16 killed 68 wounded

The Ferrol Expedition (also known as the Battle of Brión) was an unsuccessful British attempt to capture Ferrol, Spain, on 25 and 26 August 1800. Ferrol was a major Spanish Navy base with a shipyard for shipbuilding and a dry dock for repairs.

== Background ==
The primary object of the British expedition and fleet of 109 ships during the year 1800 was the conquest of Belle Île but the French defences appeared too strong. The expedition therefore proceeded to the coast of Spain, where it arrived on 25 August.

== Battle ==
After a heavy cannonade against a small Spanish fort of eight 24-pounder cannon by the British ships of the line HMS Impetueux with 74 guns, HMS London with 96 guns, HMS Courageux, HMS Renown and HMS Captain, each with 74 guns. HMS Impetueus, HMS Brilliant, HMS Cynthia and the small gunner HMS St. Vincent state on their logs to have taken part in the gunning of the small Fort. No mention on HMS London and HMS Renown logs of being part of the gunning. Under the superintendence of Sir Edward Pellew, the British effected a landing at a small opening near Cape Prior. The army commander was Lieutenant-general Sir James Pulteney. The force landed consisted of seven British regiments, one of two battalions, and the rifle-corps totaling 8,000 troops and 16 field pieces.

The Spanish defenders of Ferrol were: Don Francisco Melgarejo (a Naval Engineer), commander of the naval department; Juan Joaquín Moreno de Mondragón, commander of the squadron stationed in the harbour; Don Francisco Xavier Negrété, captain-general of the province; and Field Marshal Count Donadio, who commanded the fortifications that protected the coast. The Spanish ship of the line were: Real Carlos and San Hermenegildo, each 112 guns; San Fernando, 96 guns; Argonauta, 80 guns; San Antonio and San Agustín, each 74 guns.

The British rifle-corps advanced up a ridge and was attacked by a Spanish detachment which it drove back with some loss. Early on the morning of 26 August a considerable body of Spanish attacked the British on the heights of Brion and Balon but they were repulsed. British casualties were 16 killed and 68 wounded. The heights overlooked the town and harbour of Ferrol. That night, after observing the strength of the fortifications, the British troops and artillery were embarked back on their ships.

== Aftermath ==
The embarkation of the troops and artillery was effected, and soon after this failure on the coast of Galicia, another expedition, equally unsuccessful was directed on October against the city of Cádiz. The assault had to be abandoned due to an outbreak of yellow fever among British troops, After the unsuccessful attempt to capture Ferrol, the British Prime Minister William Pitt said in the House of Commons that: "If Great Britain had a naval station so easy to defend as Ferrol, due to its location, it would have been surrounded by a thick silver wall".

== Sources ==
Rodrigo Ramos Ardá. "El Desembarco de Doniños en la documentación Británica". Edicións Embora Ferrol, 2002 (ISBN 84-95460-16-5)

- D'Esmenard. Memoirs of Don Manuel de Godoy Vol II: Prince of the Peace, Kessinger Publishing ISBN 0-548-16683-8
- Escrigas, Guillermo. Ferrol heroico; la defensa de el Ferrol en 1800. Ferrol, 1969. (Spanish)
- James, William. The Naval History of Great Britain from the Declaration of War by France, in February 1793, to the Accession of George IV. in January 1820, Vol. 3, London, 1826,
- Philippart, John. The Royal Military Calendar, or Army Service and Commission Book. London: A.J. Valpy, 1820. Vol II.
- Black, Jeremy. A military history of Britain: from 1775 to the present Greenwood Publishing group, ISBN 0-275-99039-7
- Edward Baines, History of the Wars of the French Revolution, from the Breaking Out of the War, in 1792, to the Restoration of a General Peace in 1815: Comprehending the Civil History of Great Britain and France, During that Period, Longman, Hurst, Rees, Orme, and Brown, 1818.
- The Parliamentary history of England from the earliest period to the year 1803.... London, 1806. Vol II. 1812–1820.
- The London chronicle, Volume 87, 11 to 13 September 1801, pp. 257 – 258, Lt. Gen. Pulteney's General Orders.
- La Gaceta de Madrid 08/31/1800 ( Descrioción and casualty figures for the battle)
