= Pierre-Augustin Moncousu =

French naval officer

Pierre Augustin Moncousu (French pronunciation: [pjɛʁ oɡystɛ̃ mɔ̃kuzy]; August 1756 – 6 July 1801) was a French naval officer.

== Career ==
Moncousu was born in Baugé. He took part in the Battle of Groix commanding Redoutable, and died at the First Battle of Algeciras.

== Family ==
Moncousu's first-born son was also named Pierre-Augustin, and served in the Navy as well. Ensign in 1815, he was expelled from the Navy after fomenting a plot with five other officers to ferry Napoléon from Rochefort to the United States.

== Notes and references ==
=== Bibliography ===
- Levot, Prosper (1866). Les gloires maritimes de la France: notices biographiques sur les plus célèbres marins (in French). Bertrand.
- Fonds Marine. Campagnes (opérations; divisions et stations navales; missions diverses). Inventaire de la sous-série Marine BB4. Tome premier : BB4 1 à 482 (1790–1826)
