= Aiskew Hollis =

Vice-Admiral Aiskew Hollis
- Born: c. 1764
- Died: 23 June 1844; Southampton, Hampshire
- Military career
- Allegiance: United Kingdom
- Branch: Royal Navy
- Service years: 1774–1844
- Rank: Vice-Admiral
- Conflicts: American Revolutionary War; Battle of Ushant; French Revolutionary Wars; Glorious First of June; Battle of Groix; Second Battle of Algeciras; Napoleonic Wars

Vice-Admiral Aiskew Paffard Hollis (c. 1764 – 23 June 1844) was a Royal Navy officer of the early nineteenth century who is best known for his service in the French Revolutionary and Napoleonic Wars. Born in the 1760s, Hollis entered the Navy in 1774 and served during the American Revolutionary War, seeing action at the Battle of Ushant and the French Revolutionary Wars in which he was badly wounded at the Glorious First of June. In 1801, as the captain of HMS Thames Hollis was heavily engaged at the Second Battle of Algeciras and in the Napoleonic Wars he served in a number of commissions and all major theatres.

== Life ==
Aiskew Paffard Hollis was born in approximately 1764 and joined the Royal Navy aged just ten in 1774 under the patronage of Captain Parry. Hollis served as a midshipman in the American War of Independence, first in the West Indies and later in the English Channel in a succession of frigates. By 1778 he was serving in HMS Valiant, which was engaged in the Battle of Ushant under Admiral Augustus Keppel. He was promoted to lieutenant in 1781 and remained in the Navy following the end of the war, serving in a number of ships before, in 1793, joining HMS Queen at the request of Rear-Admiral Alan Gardner. In Queen, Hollis served in the Channel Fleet during the early years of the war and was badly wounded in the head by flying splinters at the Glorious First of June in 1794, during which Queen was heavily engaged. He also saw action the following year at the Battle of Groix.

In 1797, after a period of service in HMS Royal Sovereign and following promotion to commander in HMS Chichester, Hollis was sent to the Cape of Good Hope. There he was given command of guardship HMS Jupiter and tasked with putting down a mutiny at Robben Island by the crew of HMS Crescent. Hollis advanced on Crescent subdued the crew without conflict and towed the ship back to Cape Town, where the ringleaders of the mutiny were tried and convicted. As a reward, Hollis was given command of HMS Tremendous on the station and then the frigate HMS Vindictive, in which he escorted an East India Company convoy back to Britain. He was subsequently given command of HMS Thames in June 1801 and the following month participated in the Algeciras Campaign, firing on the French ship of the line Formidable during the Second Battle of Algeciras. He subsequently participated in a number of raids on the Spanish coastline before being sent back to Britain with his ship.

Thames was decommissioned soon afterward and Hollis given command of HMS Mermaid, sailing to the West Indies in 1804, and was anchored at Havana when war broke out between Britain and Spain. To avoid his ship being seized, Hollis was forced to warp out of the harbour at night just before the Spanish attacked his ship. Mermaid was subsequently attached to the North American command, blockading French forces anchored in Chesapeake Bay until 1807, when the ship was sent back to Britain for urgent repairs. Hollis was transferred to HMS Standard and joined the Baltic Fleet, where he commanded the squadron that captured the Danish fortress at Anholt. He remained in the Baltic Sea until 1811, when he was transferred to HMS Achille in which he served with the Mediterranean Fleet, especially in the Adriatic Sea. He later served with the Channel Fleet and was on convoy duty off South America when the war ended.

Following the end of the Napoleonic Wars he took command of HMS Rivoli and then HMS Ramillies, serving as acting commander at Portsmouth for several long periods and in 1820 entertaining King George IV during a visit to the dockyard. He did not hold an active commission after 1820, but remained in service and rose to the rank of vice-admiral, retiring to his estate at Highfield, Southampton and dying there aged 80 in June 1844.
