= HMS Venerable (1784) =

Ship of the line of the Royal Navy

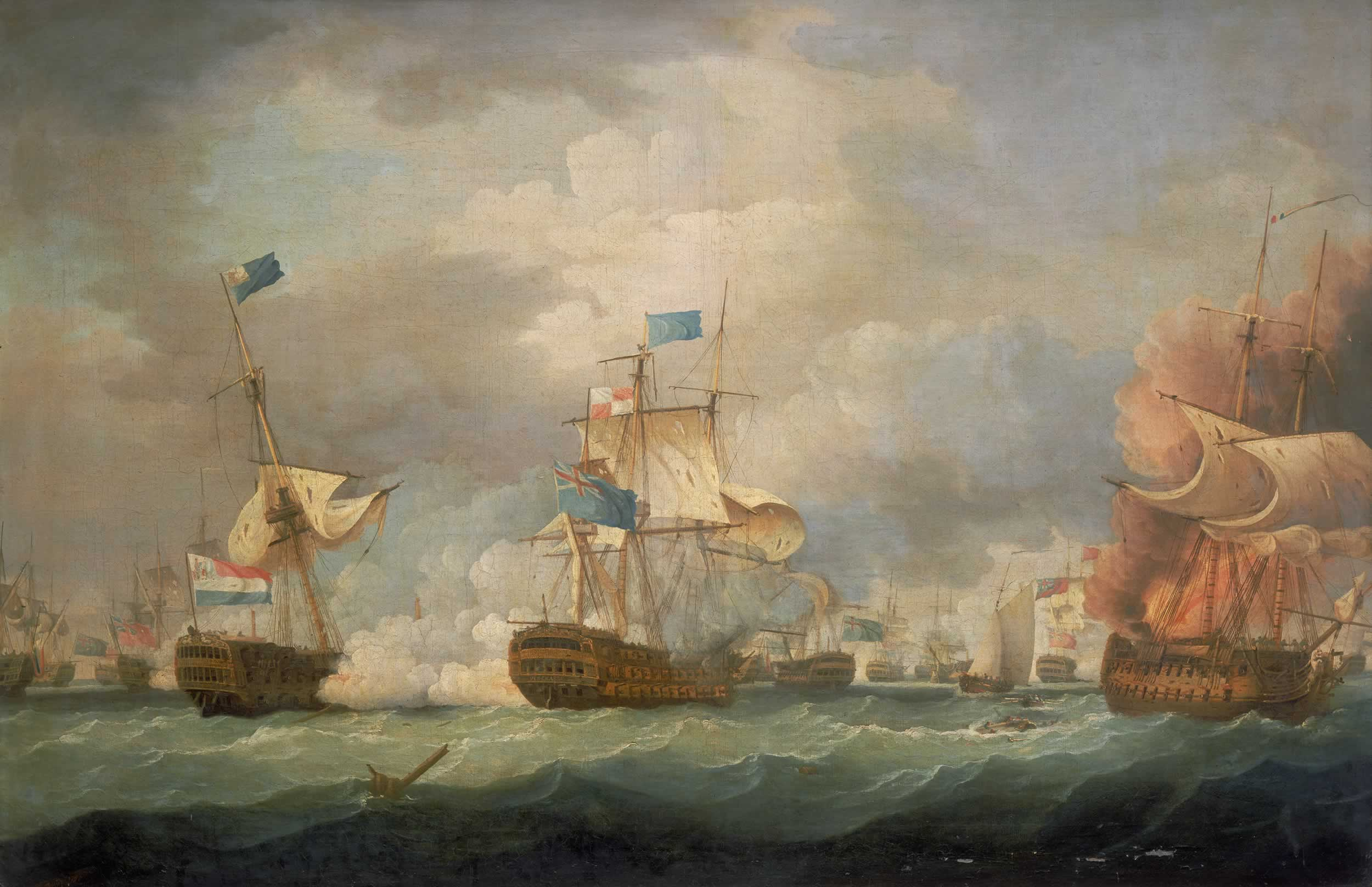
- The Battle of Camperdown, 11 October 1797 by Thomas Whitcombe, painted 1798, showing the British flagship Venerable (flying the Blue Ensign from her stern) engaged with the Dutch flagship Vrijheid.

History

Great Britain
- Name: HMS Venerable
- Ordered: 9 August 1781
- Builder: Perry, Wells & Green, Blackwall Yard
- Laid down: April 1782
- Launched: 19 April 1784
- Fate: Wrecked 24 November 1804
- Notes: Participated in: Battle of Camperdown

General characteristics
- Class & type: Culloden-class ship of the line
- Tons burthen: 1669 (bm)
- Length: 170 ft (51.8 m) (gundeck)
- Beam: 47 ft 2 in (14.4 m)
- Depth of hold: 19 ft 11 in (6.1 m)
- Propulsion: Sails
- Sail plan: Full-rigged ship
- Armament: Gundeck: 28 × 32-pounder guns; Upper gundeck: 28 × 18-pounder guns; QD: 14 × 9-pounder guns; Fc: 4 × 9-pounder guns

HMS Venerable was a 74-gun third-rate ship of the line of the Royal Navy, launched on 19 April 1784 at Blackwall Yard.

== Service history ==
In 1795, Veneraable is known to have been under the command of Captain James Bissett. In 1797, Venerable served as Admiral Duncan's flagship at the Battle of Camperdown.

In 1801, Venerable took part in the First Battle of Algeciras on 6 July and the Second Battle of Algeciras on 12–13 July. During the latter engagement, she was driven ashore on the coast of Spain in Algeciras Bay, but she was refloated, repaired, and returned to service.

== Fate ==
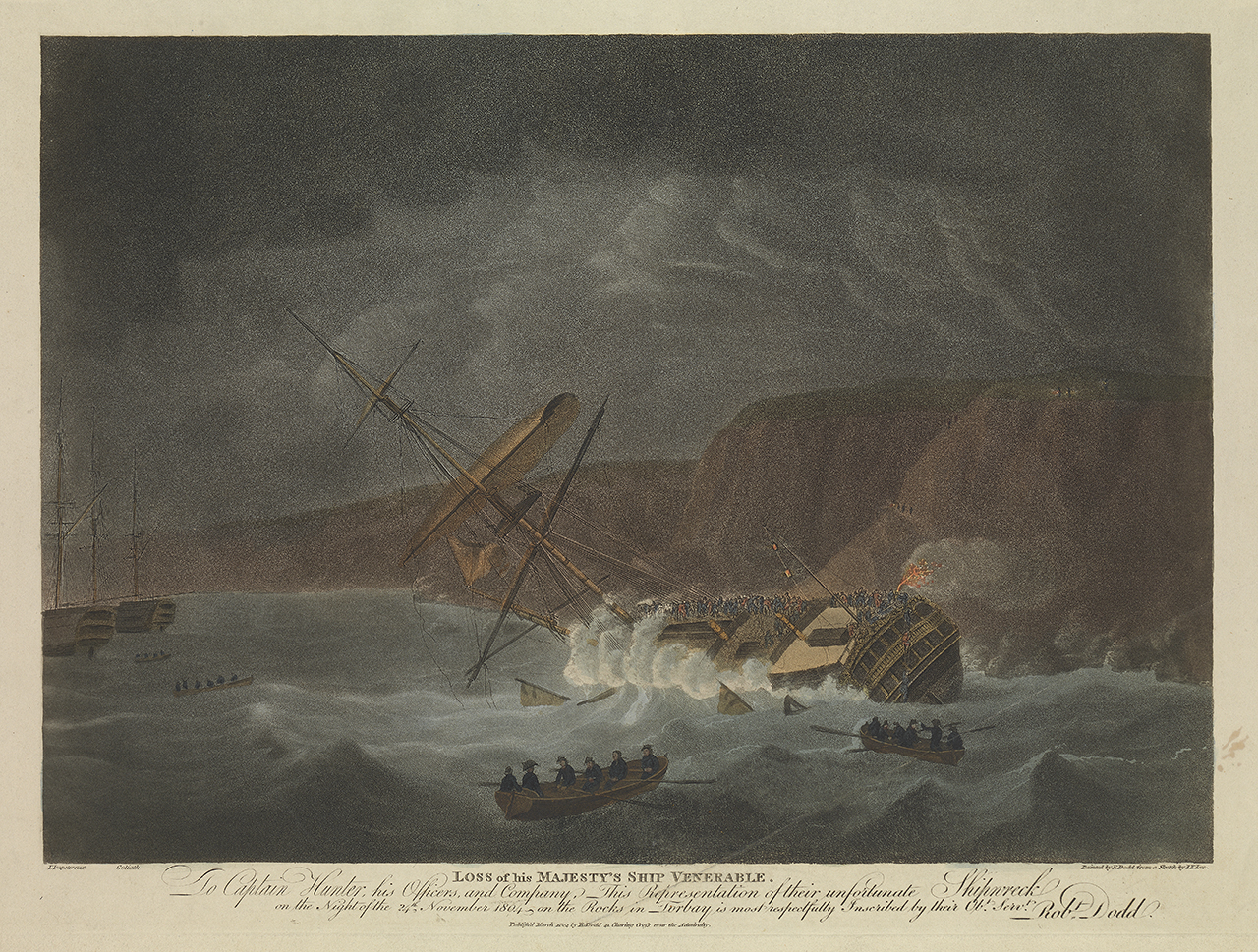
Loss of His Majesty's Ship Venerable... Shipwreck on the Night of 24 November 1804 on the Rocks in Torbay, by Robert Dodd

Venerable was wrecked on 24 November 1804, off Roundham Head near Torbay. Three of her crew were lost. Newspapers reported a dispatch dated 28 November: The Venerable had gone to pieces in a tremendous gale, the number of men drowned is said to be 13 — they are supposed to have been intoxicated when the ship struck. The commander of the Venerable was Captain Hunter, a brave and skilful officer and a gentleman of considerable literary and scientific acquirements who was for some time governor of New South Wales and has favoured the public with an interesting account of that colony.

Two days later, on 26 November, the hired armed ship Lady Warren sailed from Plymouth to Torbay with Growler, six gun-vessels and yard-lighters, and other craft, to save the stores, guns, etc. from the wreck of Venerable.

Elizabeth Goudge used the event of the destruction of H.M.S. Venerable in a storm as a key event in her 1950 novel, Gentian Hill, as Goudge acknowledged in her prefatory Note.
