= HMS Superb (1798) =

Third-rate ship of the line of the Royal Navy

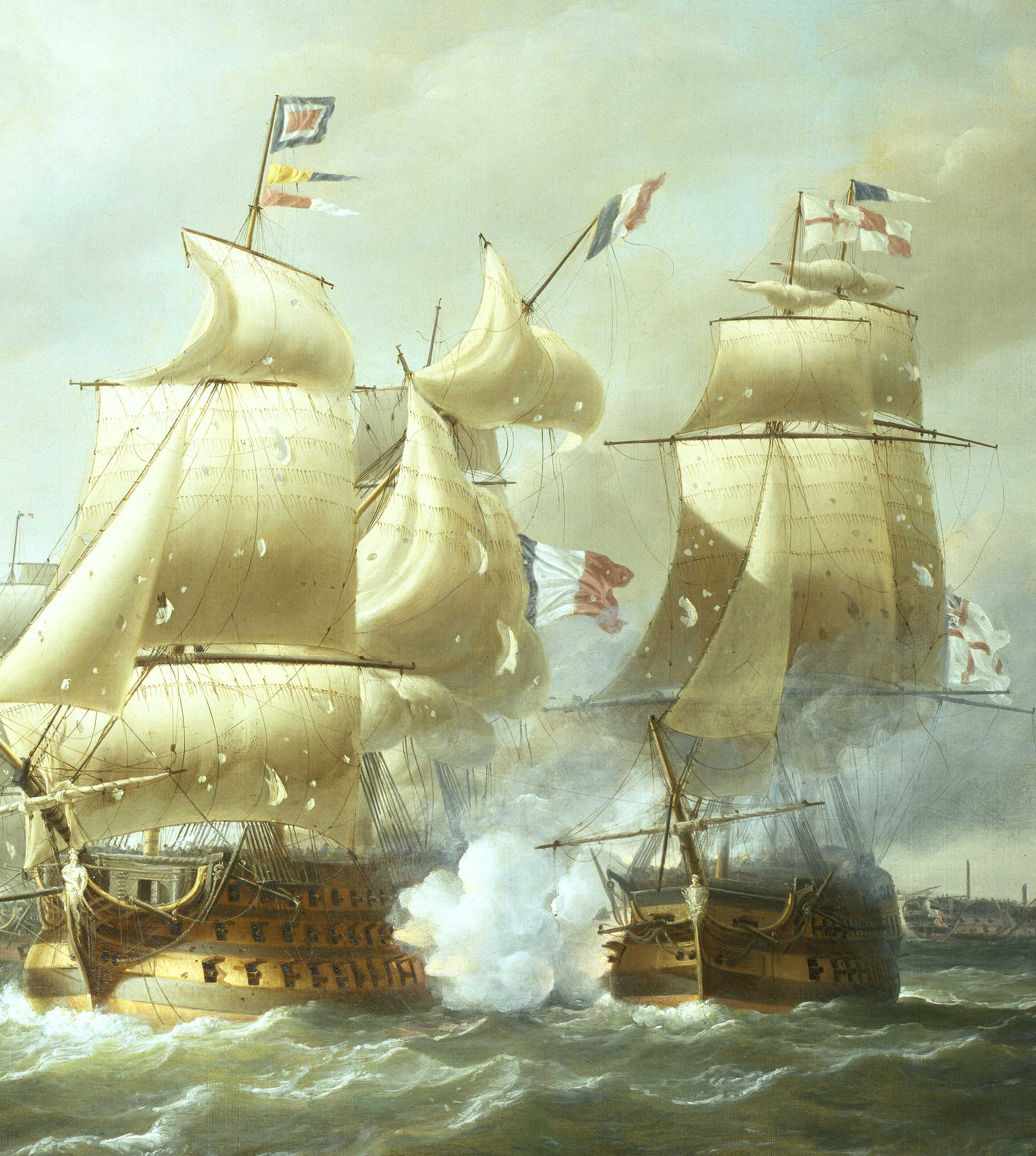
- Superb (right) at the Battle of San Domingo

History

Great Britain
- Name: HMS Superb
- Ordered: 10 June 1795
- Builder: Pitcher, Northfleet
- Laid down: August 1795
- Launched: 19 March 1798
- Fate: Broken up, 1826
- Notes: Participated in: Battle of Algeciras; Battle of San Domingo; Bombardment of Algiers (1816)

General characteristics
- Class & type: Pompée-class ship of the line
- Tons burthen: 1,919 bm
- Length: 182 ft 2 in (55.52 m) (gundeck)
- Beam: 49 ft (15 m)
- Depth of hold: 21 ft (6.4 m)
- Sail plan: Full-rigged ship
- Armament: 74 guns: Gundeck: 28 × 32-pounder guns; Upper gundeck: 30 × 18-pounder guns; QD: 12 × 9-pounder guns; Fc: 4 × 9-pounder guns

HMS Superb was a 74-gun third-rate ship of the line of the Royal Navy, and the fourth vessel to bear the name. She was launched on 19 March 1798 from Northfleet, and was eventually broken up in 1826. Superb is mostly associated with Richard Goodwin Keats who commanded her as captain from 1801 until his promotion in 1806. Keats famously spent only one night (in Algiers) out of the ship during four and a half years out of a home port. She also served as his flagship from early 1808 until she was paid off in 1809. Keats's captain's orders for the ship were comprehensive and used by the fledgling US navy, being found on USS Philadelphia in 1803 and the USS President a decade later.

== Battle of Algeciras Bay ==
In July 1801 the Superb was stationed off Cádiz and took part in the second Battle of Algeciras Bay. During the French and Spanish retreat Admiral Sir James Saumarez hailed the Superb and ordered Keats to catch the allied fleet's rear and engage. The Superb was a relatively new ship and had not been long on blockade duty. As a consequence she was the fastest sailing ship-of-the-line in the fleet. As night fell on 12 July, Keats sailed the Superb alongside the 112-gun Real Carlos on her starboard side. Another Spanish ship, the 112-gun San Hermenegildo, was sailing abreast, on the port side, of the Real Carlos. Keats fired into the Real Carlos and some shot passed her and struck the San Hermenegildo. The Real Carlos caught fire and Keats disengaged her to continue up the line. In the darkness the two Spanish ships confused one another for British ships and began a furious duel. With the Real Carlos aflame the captain of the Hermenegildo determined to take advantage and crossed the Real Carlos' stern in order to deal a fatal broadside that would run the length of the ship through the unprotected stern. A sudden gust of wind brought the two ships together and entangled their rigging. The Hermenegildo also caught fire and the two enormous three-deck ships exploded. The Superb continued on relatively unscathed and engaged the French 74-gun Saint Antoine under Commodore Julien le Roy. The Saint Antoine struck after a fierce exchange of broadsides.

Following the treaty of Amiens she was stationed in the Mediterranean keeping watch over the French in Toulon. On renewal of the wars Nelson took command of the Mediterranean fleet, including Keats and the Superb. They accompanied Nelson in the pursuit of Villeneuve to the West Indies and back. The Superb, now three years out of home port, was in a poor state, giving rise to the poem "The Old Superb" by Henry Newbolt (set to music in 1904 by Stanford in his Songs of the Sea). As early as May 1804 Nelson wrote "the Superb must be sent to England before that period [winter] arrives, as her stem and the knees of her head are loose and broke—nothing but the great exertions of Captain Keats has kept her at sea this last season". She arrived at Algiers 10 June 1804. On 31 December, 1804 she was 100 miles east of Minorca. On their return to Cádiz the Superb was ordered home for a refit—which resulted in the ship, captain and crew missing Trafalgar.

== Battle of San Domingo 1806 ==
She was the flagship of Admiral John Thomas Duckworth, with Richard Goodwin Keats her captain when they reached Cádiz after Trafalgar and were ordered to maintain the blockade of the remaining French fleet.

Duckworth abandoned the blockade in pursuit of a French squadron reported to have been in the Atlantic near Madeira. Duckworth came across another squadron in the West Indies which lead the Battle of San Domingo, (the last fleet battle of the age of sail on the open sea) in which the English destroyed or captured nearly the entirety of the French squadron, the frigates only escaping.

== Copenhagen and the Baltic ==
On 26 July 1808, Superb, Monkey, and Baltic captured Falck and Kline Wiloelm.

Superb was commissioned in December 1809 under the command of Captain Samuel Jackson. She went out to the Baltic as Keats's flagship, and was part of the squadron there under Admiral Sir James Saumarez. There she was engaged in convoy duties in the Sound and Great Belt protecting British merchants from the predation of Danish gun-boats.

The squadron under Keats's command, including the Superb successfully undertook the evacuation of La Romana's division of the Spanish northern army from the Danish islands, taking the port of Nyborg, commandeering 57 small boats in the harbour and transferring the men to nearby Langeland before forming a convoy upwards of 70 craft taking the 9,000 men to Gothenburg.

Superb returned to Portsmouth, and underwent repairs between September 1811 and November 1812, before commissioning in September 1812 under Captain Charles Paget.

== War of 1812 ==
Paget was appointed to command Superb as part of the Channel Fleet, and during a cruise in the Bay of Biscay he took several prizes.

On 13 February 1813 Star, which had been sailing from New York to Bordeaux, arrived at Bideford. She was a prize to Superb. Captain Paget described the prize as "the fine American brig Star, of three hundred and fifty tons, six guns, and thirty-five men."

In 1814 Superb was employed on the coast of North America under the orders of Sir Alexander Cochrane and took part in an attack upon Wareham, Massachusetts during the War of 1812.
