= Juan Joaquín Moreno de Mondragón =

Spanish Navy officer

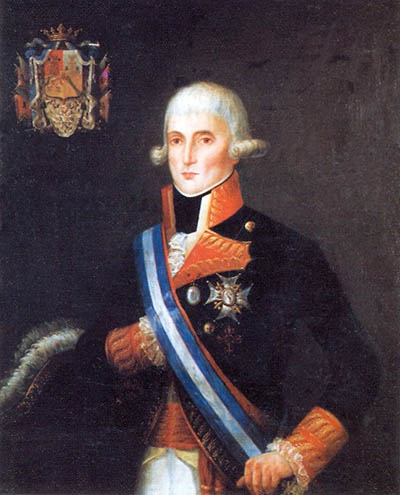
Portrait of Mondragón

Lieutenant-General Juan Joaquín Moreno de Mondragón y D'Hontlier (24 September 1735 – 8 September 1812) was a Spanish Navy officer who served in the French Revolutionary and Napoleonic Wars. At the time of his death he was captain general of the Department of Cádiz. Mondragón was also a military knight and commander of Lopera of the Order of Calatrava, Grand Cross of the Royal and Most Distinguished Spanish Order of Charles III and Master of Ronda.

Mondragón was a son of Francisco Moreno de Mendoza y Vázquez de Mondragón (field marshal and knight of Santiago) and Catalina D'Hontlier y Berthier de la Motte (who through her mother was heiress of the barony of Berthier in France). Born in Ceuta (where his father was attorney general), he joined the Marine Guards corps in the Company of the Department of Cádiz on 4 March 1751, aged sixteen.

== External links (in Spanish) ==
- Caballeros de la Orden de Santiago Siglo XVIII
- Informe dado por el brigadier de la Real Armada D. Francisco de Hoyos sobre la vida de D. Juan Joaquín Moreno
- Revista de Historia Naval, nº74 año 2001
- Diario del General Moreno
