= Siren =

Siren or sirens may refer to:

== Common meanings ==
- Siren (alarm), a loud acoustic alarm used to alert people to emergencies
- Siren (mythology), in Greek mythology a female being who lured sailors to their deaths

== People ==
- Siren (surname)
- Shelley Beattie, female bodybuilder on the TV show American Gladiators, known by the stage name "Siren"
- Valerie Waugaman, on the 2008 revival of American Gladiators, known by the stage name "Siren"
- Alexander Brandon (born 1974), American musician, known as "Siren" in the demoscene
- Siren Sundby (born 1982), Norwegian Olympic sailor

== Places ==
- Siren (town), Wisconsin, US
  - Siren, Wisconsin, a village within the town
- Siren Bay, Victoria Land, Antarctica
- Siren Rock, Ellsworth Land, Antarctica

== Animals ==
- Sirenidae, a family of aquatic salamanders
  - Siren (genus), a genus of aquatic salamanders in the family Sirenidae
- Hestina, a genus of brush-footed butterfly commonly called sirens
- Sirenia, an order of aquatic mammals including dugongs and manatees

== Arts, entertainment, and media ==
=== Fictional characters ===
- Siren (DC Comics), the name of two DC Comics characters
- Siren (Transformers), from The Transformers: Headmasters
- Siren Sorrento, from Saint Seiya
- Siren, a character in Ice Age: Continental Drift
- Siren, a minor character in Passions
- Sirens, video game characters in Borderlands
- Shadow Sirens, major antagonists (except Vivian) in Paper Mario: The Thousand Year Door
- The Siren, a character from the 1960s Batman TV series unrelated to the DC Comics Siren
- Siren (Malibu Comics), from Malibu Comics' Ultraverse imprint

=== Films ===
- The Siren (1917 film), a lost Fox film starring Valeska Suratt
- The Siren (1927 film), an American melodrama directed by Byron Haskin
- Siren (1968 film), a Belgian animated short film
- Sirens (1994 film), starring Hugh Grant, directed by John Duigan
- Sirens (1999 film), starring Dana Delany
- Siren (2010 film), a horror film starring Eoin Macken
- Siren (2013 film), starring Vinessa Shaw
- Siren (2016 film), an American horror film
- Siren (2024 film), an Indian Tamil-language film

=== Literature ===
- Siren (play), 1990, by David Williamson
- Siren, a book by Tara Moss
- "Sirens" (Ulysses episode) an episode in James Joyce's novel Ulysses
- The Siren, a novel by Kiera Cass

=== Music ===
==== Groups ====
- Sirens (American band), metalcore band from Terre Haute, Indiana
- Sirens (British band), a Newcastle upon Tyne based girl group
- Siren, a rock band featuring Kevin Coyne

==== Albums and EPs ====
===== Siren =====
- Siren (Heather Nova album), 1998
- Siren (Roxy Music album), 1975
- Siren (Susumu Hirasawa album), 1996

===== Sirens =====
- Sirens (Astarte album), 2004
- Sirens (Gorgon City album), 2014
- Sirens (It Dies Today album), 2006
- Sirens (Kenneth Newby album), 1997
- Sirens (Kevin Richard Martin album), 2019
- Sirens (May Jailer album), unreleased demo album by Lana Del Rey, recorded under the name May Jailer, 2006
- Sirens (Nicolas Jaar album), 2016
- Sirens (Nine Black Alps album), 2012
- Sirens (On the Might of Princes album), 2003
- Sirens (Savatage album), 1983
- Sirens (S. J. Tucker album), 2006
- Sirens (Sublime with Rome album), 2015
- Sirens (The Weepies album), 2015
- Sirens (Woodlock EP), 2015
- Sirens, by Ben Abraham, 2014
- Sirens, by Swingin' Utters, 2020
- The Sirens (Chris Potter album), 2013
- The Sirens (Into Eternity album), 2018

==== Songs ====
===== Siren =====
- "Siren" (Asian Kung-Fu Generation song), 2004
- "Siren" (Malcolm Lincoln song), 2010
- "Siren" (Ruby Gloom song), 2008
- "Siren" (Paces song), 2018
- "Siren" (Riize song), 2024
- "Siren" (Sunmi song), 2018
- "Siren", by Ateez on the 2024 EP Golden Hour: Part.1
- "Siren", by the Dropkick Murphys, 2024
- "Siren", by Once Human from The Life I Remember, 2015
- "Siren", by Taeyeon from INVU, 2022
- "Siren", by Theater of Tragedy from Aégis, 1998
- "Siren", by Tori Amos from the film Great Expectations, 1998
- "The Siren" (song), by Nightwish
- "The Siren", by Aesthetic Perfection from A Violent Emotion, 2008
- "The Siren", by Graveyard from Hisingen Blues, 2011
- "The Siren", by Seven Spires from Solveig, 2017

===== Sirens =====
- "Sirens" (Cher Lloyd song), 2014
- "Sirens" (Dizzee Rascal song), 2007
- "Sirens" (Jeff Lynne song), 1990
- "Sirens" (Pearl Jam song), 2013
- "Sirens" (Travis Scott song), 2023
- "Sirens", by Angels & Airwaves from I-Empire, 2007
- "Sirens", by Candiria from Kiss the Lie, 2008
- "Sirens", by Coroner from Mental Vortex, 1991
- "Sirens", by Denzel Curry featuring JID and Billie Eilish, from Ta13oo, 2018
- "Sirens", by Flume and Caroline Polachek from Palaces, 2022
- "Sirens", by Humanity's Last Breath from Välde, 2021
- "Sirens", by Imagine Dragons from Mercury – Acts 1 & 2, 2022
- "Sirens", by Kelsea Ballerini from The First Time, 2015
- "Sirens", by Markus Feehily from Fire, 2015
- "Sirens", by Savatage on the eponymous album, 1983
- "Sirens", by The String Cheese Incident from Untying the Not, 2003
- "Sirens", by Nell Bryden, 2012
  - This song was covered by Cher for Closer to the Truth, 2013
- "Sirens", by Tesseract from War of Being, 2023
- "Sirens", by Tristania from Rubicon, 2010
- "Sirens", by Tim Deluxe, 2001
- "The Sirens", by George and Ira Gershwin from A Dangerous Maid, 1921

===== Other uses in music =====
- Sirènes ("Sirens"), a movement in the Debussy suite Nocturnes
- The Sirens, Op. 33, by Reinhold Glière
- The Siren (musical), a 1911 Broadway musical
- Acme Siren, a varying-pitch wind instrument, often found in the percussion section of orchestras
- Siren Music Festival, an annual outdoor concert held at Coney Island, New York, from 2001 to 2010

=== Paintings ===
- The Siren (Waterhouse painting), 1900, by John William Waterhouse
- The Siren, 1888, by Edward Armitage

=== Sculptures ===
- Siren (Quinn), a 2008 life-size statue by Marc Quinn
- The Siren (sculpture), 2005, by Norman J. Gitzen
- Siren (bronze sculpture), Roman bronze sculpture ca. 1571–90
- The Sirens (sculpture), an 1887 bronze sculpture by Auguste Rodin

=== Television ===
==== Series ====
- Sirens (1993 TV series), an American crime drama series
- Sirens (2002 TV serial), a two-part British serial
- Sirens (2011 TV series), a British television programme broadcast on Channel 4
- Sirens (2014 TV series), an American comedy program based on the Channel 4 series
- Sirens (2025 TV series), an American Netflix black comedy limited series
- Supermodel Me: Sirens, the fifth season of Asian's reality program Supermodel Me
- Siren (TV series), a 2018 American fantasy drama series
- Siren: Survive the Island, a 2023 South Korean reality competition series

==== Episodes ====
- "Siren" (Millennium), television series episode
- "The Siren" (What We Do in the Shadows)
- "Sirens", an episode of Aqua Teen Hunger Force
- "The Siren", an episode of Mako: Island of Secrets

=== Other arts, entertainment, and media ===
- Siren (video game), 2003
- Company of Sirens, a Canadian feminist theatre company
- Siren (magazine), a bimonthly Canadian magazine
- Siren FM, a community radio station based at the University of Lincoln in the UK

== Court cases ==
- The Siren; see List of United States Supreme Court cases, volume 74
- The Siren; see List of United States Supreme Court cases, volume 80

== Military ==
- HMS Siren, several Royal Navy ships
- USS Siren, several US Navy ships
- SS-N-9 Siren, NATO reporting name for the P-120 Malakhit, a Russian anti-ship missile

== Sports ==
- Cleveland Sirens, a WNBA team set to begin play in the 2028 season
- New York Sirens, a women's hockey team in the Professional Women's Hockey League
- Monterey Bay Sirens, a women's soccer team in the USL W League
- Sacramento Sirens, a women's football team
- Saskatoon Sirens, an expansion team in the Legends Football League
- Sirens A.S.C., a waterpolo club in Malta
- Sirens F.C., a football club in Malta
- Strathclyde Sirens, a Scottish netball team
- Sydney Sirens, an ice hockey team in the Australian Women's Ice Hockey League
- Christchurch Sirens, a defunct basketball team in the Women's National Basketball League

== Other uses ==
- Siren (codec), an audio codec
- Siren (fragrance), a perfume endorsed by Paris Hilton
- SIREN code, a nine-digit number given to all French businesses
- SIREN, an open energy system model developed for Western Australia
- Standard siren, a unit of gravitational waves

== See also ==
- Cyren (disambiguation)
- Siran (disambiguation)
- Sirena (disambiguation)
- Sirene (disambiguation)
- Syreen, an alien race in the computer game series Star Control
- Siryn. a character from Marvel Comics
- Syren (disambiguation)
