= Sarina (given name) =

Sarina is a female name. Notable people with the name include:

== Arts and entertainment ==
- Sarina Brewer, American sculptor
- Sarina Cassvan (1894–1978), Romanian novelist
- Sarina Cross (born 1994), Lebanese-Armenian singer
- Sarina Farhadi Iranian actress
- Sarina Maskey (born 1987), Nepalese beauty pageant winner
- Sarina Paris (born 1973), Canadian singer
- Sarina Singh, Australian author
- Sarina Suno, Japanese violinist
- Sarina Suzuki (born 1977), Japanese actress

== Business ==
- Sarina Prabasi (born 1973/74), Nepalese executive
- Sarina Russo (born 1951), Australian executive

== Sports ==
- Sarina Bolden (born 1996), Filipino footballer
- Sarina Hülsenbeck (born 1962), East German swimmer
- Sarina Koga (born 1996), Japanese volleyball player
- Sarina Roberti (born 1963), Belgian rhythmic gymnast
- Sarina Wiegman (born 1969), Dutch footballer
- Sarina Satomi (born 1998), Japanese para-badminton player

== See also ==
- Sarina (disambiguation)
- Serena (given name)
- Sakina (given name)
- Sarena Parmar
- Serina (actress)
- Sirena (disambiguation)
- Sirina (disambiguation)
