= Sirena =

Sirena(s) or La Sirena may refer to:

== Mythology ==
- Siren (mythology)
- Sirena (Philippine mythology), a mermaid of Philippine mythology

== People ==
- Sirena Huang (born 1994), American violinist
- Sirena Irwin, American voice director and actress
- Sirena Rowe (born 1998), Colombian swimmer
- Max Sirena (born 1971), Italian sailor
- Paolo Sirena (1945–2025), Italian football player

== Places ==
- Sirena Deep, a landform in the Pacific Ocean
- La Sirena Beach, Rocha Department, Uruguay
- Lake Sirena, a lake near the town of Lake Placid, Florida, US
- Sirena Aerodrome, a grass airstrip in Corcovado National Park, Costa Rica

== Arts and entertainment ==
=== Literature ===
- Sirena (journal), a Spanish-language academic poetry and art journal 2004–2012
- Sirena, a 1998 novel by Donna Jo Napoli

=== Music ===
==== Albums ====
- Sirena, by Cousteau, 2002
- Sirenas, by División Minúscula, 2008

==== Songs ====
- "Sirena" (song), by Filipino rapper Gloc-9, 2012
- "Sirena", by Calexico from Convict Pool, 2004
- "Sirena", by Dirty Three from Ocean Songs, 1998
- "Sirena", by Enrique Inglesias from Cosas del Amor, 1998
- "Sirena", by Maldita Vecindad y los Hijos del Quinto Patio from Mostros, 1998
- "Sirena", by Robert Rich and Alio Die (Stefano Musso) from Fissures, 1997
- "Sirena", by Sin Bandera from Sin Bandera, 2002
- "La Sirena", by Maná from Sueños Líquidos, 1997
- "La Sirena", by Dhani Harrison from Innerstanding, 2023

=== Television ===
- Sirena (TV series), a 1993 Venezuelan telenovela
- Sirena, a character in the series Mako: Island of Secrets
- La Sirena, a fictional ship in the TV series Star Trek: Picard

== Maritime ==
- Sirena-class submarine, 1930s/1940s coastal submarines of the Royal Italian Navy
- MS Sirena, a cruise ship owned by Oceania Cruises
- Sirena, an Italian frigate
- Venus B, a cargo ship formerly named Sirena

== See also ==
- La Sirena (restaurant)
- Sarina (disambiguation)
- Serena (disambiguation)
- Siren (disambiguation)
- Sirene (disambiguation)
- Sirenia, an order of marine mammals
- Syrena (disambiguation)
