= Robert Fancourt =

Royal Navy Admiral (1742–1826)

Vice-Admiral Robert Fancourt
- Born: 1742
- Died: 7 June 1826 (aged 83–84)
- Allegiance: Kingdom of Great Britain; United Kingdom
- Branch: Royal Navy
- Rank: Vice-Admiral

Robert Devereux Fancourt (1742 – 7 June 1826) was a Royal Navy officer who saw active service during the Seven Years' War and the French Revolutionary War. He joined the Navy in 1759 and served in North America and the West Indies. Fancourt passed his lieutenant's examination in 1765 but was not promoted until 1777 and made Post Captain in 1789. The following year, he was appointed to HMS Ambuscade in the Mediterranean.

In 1797, Fancourt took command of HMS Agamemnon and became involved in the fleet mutinies when his ship was taken by the crew that May. He was still in command of Agamemnon in 1800, when he was sent to the Baltic to pressure Denmark into withdrawing from the League of Armed Neutrality. Although present at the Battle of Copenhagen in 1801, Fancourt took no active role; Agamemnon running aground in the very early stages. Fancourt advanced to the rank of rear-admiral on 28 April 1808 and vice-admiral on 12 August 1812, but he never went to sea again and died on 7 June 1826.

== Career ==
Robert Devereux Fancourt was born in 1742 and joined the navy in 1759, serving as an able seaman and then midshipman under Robert Man in the waters around North America and the West Indies. He followed Man from HMS Prince Frederick to HMS Cornwall and then HMS Lancaster where, at the beginning of 1762, he met Maurice Suckling and moved with him to HMS Dreadnought.

In 1765, Fancourt passed his lieutenant's examination but it was another 12 years before he was promoted. By 1782, he had risen to first lieutenant, on board HMS Gibraltar, under Captain Thomas Hicks. Serving as flagship to Sir Richard Bickerton, Gibraltar was sent to the East Indies that February. On the way, Gibraltar stopped at Rio de Janeiro, where Bickerton purchased a 14-gun cutter which he named Substitute, giving command to Fancourt. Shortly after arrival in the Indian Ocean, Fancourt was sent home with dispatches and missed the opportunity to acquire prize money from the successful campaign there.

Between 1787 and 1789, during the peace between the American and French Revolutionary Wars, Fancourt commanded the 16-gun HMS Bulldog. He was eventually promoted to Post-Captain on 2 December 1789 and during the Spanish Armament in 1790, commissioned HMS Ambuscade and took up station in the Mediterranean.

When Great Britain became embroiled in the French Revolutionary Wars, Fancourt was in command of the 44-gun HMS Chichester, involved mainly in the escort of convoys to and from the West Indies and Mediterranean. While carrying out such duties off St Domingo in August 1794, Chichester and the 64-gun HMS Intrepid captured the French corvette, Sirenne.

In 1797, Fancourt gained command of HMS Agamemnon and was caught up in the Spithead and Nore mutinies. On 29 May, when the North Sea squadron was ordered to sea, only Fancourt's ship, Adamant and Glatton, obeyed. Agamemnon's crew however, later mutinied and returned to the Nore anchorage on 7 June. Fancourt was at dinner with the other officers when the ship was taken. When a blockade of London was suggested, support for the mutiny waned and several ships deserted. Order was restored aboard Agamemnon when the marines and the loyal seamen retook the ship. Fancourt obtained a pardon for the ship's company.

Agamemnon was one of the ships sent to the Baltic to break the Second League of Armed Neutrality. In mid 1800 she was off Elsinore, enforcing Britain's perceived right to search neutral vessels and later that year took part in the important survey of the strait between Denmark and Sweden. The survey enabled an attack on the Danish capital that led to the country's withdrawal from the league. Although present at the Battle of Copenhagen (1801), serving in Vice Admiral Horatio Nelson's squadron, Fancourt's ship was prevented from taking an active role when it went aground during the early manoeuvres. Nelson's post-battle report absolved Fancourt of any wrong-doing; stating, "The Agamemnon could not weather the shoal of the middle [ground], and was obliged to anchor, but not the smallest blame can be attached to Captain Fancourt".

Following the Baltic expedition, Agamemnon was reassigned as a guardship at Hollesley Bay, Suffolk. At some point between 1805 and 1807, Fancourt was appointed to HMS Zealand, Rear-Admiral Thomas Wells' flagship at the Nore. Fancourt advanced to the rank of Rear-Admiral himself on 28 April 1808, then Vice-Admiral on 12 August 1812. He never returned to sea and died on 7 June 1826.
