= Syrena (disambiguation) =

Syrena, or FSO Syrena, was a Polish automobile model.

Syrena may also refer to:

- Syrena Rekord, a defunct Polish record label
- Syrena (Pirates of the Caribbean), a character from the 2011 film Pirates of the Caribbean: On Stranger Tides
- Syrena Tricksy, a character from the 1741 novel The Anti-Pamela; or, Feign'd Innocence Detected by Eliza Haywood

== See also ==
- Sarina (disambiguation)
- Serena (disambiguation)
- Sirena (disambiguation)
