= Syren =

Syren may refer to:

- Syrén, a Swedish family name
- Syren (band), an alternative band
- Syren (book), the fifth book in the fantasy Septimus Heap series by Angie Sage
- Syren, Luxembourg, a small town in the commune of Weiler-la-Tour, in southern Luxembourg
- Syren River, a river in Ukraine, a tributary of Horyn River

People

- Syren Hall, a stage name of Canadian recording artist Melanie Fiona
- Håkan Syrén (born 1952), a General of the Swedish Amphibious Corps and chairman of the European Union Military Committee

Ships

- SS Syren, a Confederate blockade runner, noted for its successes during the American Civil War.
- Syren (clipper), a U.S. clipper ship
- HMS Syren, the name of four ships of the Royal Navy
- USS Syren (1803), a brig of the United States Navy during the First Barbary War and the War of 1812

== See also ==
- Siren (disambiguation)
