= Syren (ship) =

Several ships have been named Syren or Siren, after the Sirens of Greek mythology: (Note: Until the beginning of the nineteenth century (and even later) the spellings were interchangeable. Sources use different spellings for the same ships, sometimes within the same document. Between 1800 and c.1835 Syren was more common than Siren; after c.1870 Siren had almost completely replaced Syren.)

- Syren (1770 ship) was a snow launched at the Bombay Dockyard for the British East India Company and sold in 1778
- Syren was a US 7-gun privateer schooner of 189 tons (bm) commissioned in June 1814 and wrecked in November after she had captured ten British vessels
- Syren (clipper) was a clipper launched in 1851, sold in Argentina in 1888, and still listed in 1920 as Margarida
- SS Syren was launched in England in 1863 and made 33 runs through the Union blockade during the American Civil War before Union forces captured her in 1865.
- SS Siren (1929), a Norwegian icebreaker

== See also ==
- HMS Siren: one of eight vessels of the British Royal Navy
- USS Siren: one of four vessels of the United States Navy
