= Sirene (disambiguation) =

Sirene is a type of Bulgarian cheese. The word may also refer to:

== Ships ==
- Sirene (barque), a Norwegian barque wrecked in 1892
- French ship Sirène, several ships of the French Navy
- Sirène-class submarine (disambiguation), two classes of French Navy submarines
- HMS Spiteful (P227), a Royal Navy submarine loaned to France as Sirène from 1952 to 1958

== Music ==
- Die Sirene (German: "the Sirens"), a 1911 operetta by Leo Fall
- La sirène (opera) (French, "the Siren"), 1844 opera by Auber
- "La Sirène", Seize mélodies No.1 (1886) Bizet
- Sirène, a prize-winning classical album by Anna Prohaska, 2011
- Sirènes, a movement in the Debussy suite Nocturnes
- Sirene (album), a 2014 voodoo themed Norwegian-language album by Skambankt

== Media ==
- Sirene (magazine), a monthly Norwegian feminist magazine (1973–1983)
- La Sirène, a French publisher of the Sonic Adventures comics (1994)

== Other uses ==
- Sirène, the French word for mermaid
- La Sirène, a water spirit in voodoo
- Siren (1968 film), a Belgian animated short film with the Dutch title Sirene
- Sirene (or Silene), a female demon from the Devilman manga and anime series
- SIRENE (Supplementary Information Request at the National Entry), translation of data from the Schengen Information System
- 1009 Sirene, an asteroid

== See also ==
- Siren (disambiguation)
