= Nalani =

Nalani or Nālani is a given name of Hawaiian origin that may refer to:

- Nālani Kanakaʻole (born 1946), Hawaiian hula teacher
- half of Nalani & Sarina, an American soul-rock duo
- Nalani (orca) (born 2006), a captive female orca
