= Aphria =

Aphria may refer to:

- Aphria (company), a medical cannabis company in Canada
- Aphria (fly), a genus of flies

== See also ==
- Mestolobes aphrias
