= Siran =

Siran may refer to:

== Geography ==
- Siran, Cantal, a commune in the department of Cantal, France
- Siran, Hérault, a commune in the department of Hérault, France
- Siran, East Azerbaijan, a village in East Azerbaijan Province, Iran
- Siran, Markazi, a village in Markazi Province, Iran
- Siran, Shazand, a village in Markazi Province, Iran
- Siran, West Azerbaijan, a village in West Azerbaijan Province, Iran
- Şiran, a town in northeastern Turkey
- Siran Valley, valley in Khyber Pakhtunkhwa, Pakistan

== People ==
- Sigiramnus (Siran, Cyran), 7th century Frankish saint

== See also ==
- Siren (disambiguation)
