= Cyren =

Cyren may refer to:

- Cyren (surname)
- Cyren Burdick (1800–1837), American politician in Michigan
- Cyren (Ninjago), a character in Ninjago
- Cyren, a 1980s American band featuring Jani Lane
- CYREN, a defunct Internet security company
- CYREN (protein)

== See also ==
- Cyrene (disambiguation)
- Siren (disambiguation)
