= Chrystine =

Chrystine is a feminine given name. Notable people with the name include:

- Chrystine Brouillet (born 1958), Canadian novelist
- Chrystine Tauber, American equestrian

== See also ==
- Christine (name)
- Christina (given name)
