= Cyren (surname) =

Cyren or Cyrén is a Swedish surname. Notable people with the surname include:

- Karin Cyrén (born 1984), Swedish illustrator and author
- Gunnar Cyren (1931–2013), Swedish designer
- Marten Cyren (born 1958), Swedish designer
- Otto Cyrén (1878–1946), Swedish chemical engineer

== See also ==
- Cyren (disambiguation)
- Cyren Burdick (1800–1837), American politician
