= Cyrenaica (disambiguation) =

Cyrenaica is a historic region of Libya.

Cyrenaica may also refer to:

- Crete and Cyrenaica
- Islamic Tripolitania and Cyrenaica
- Ottoman Cyrenaica
- Italian Cyrenaica
- Emirate of Cyrenaica
- Cyrenaica province

== See also ==
- Cyrene (disambiguation)
