= La Serena =

La Serena may refer to:

== Places ==
- La Serena, Chile
- La Serena, Colombia
- La Serena, Spain
- La Serena, winter home of William Jennings Bryan in Coconut Grove, Miami, Florida

== Other uses ==
- La Serena (cheese)
- Deportes La Serena, a football club based in La Serena, Chile

== See also ==
- Serena (disambiguation)
