= Mestolobes quadrifascia =

Scientific classification
- Domain: Eukaryota
- Kingdom: Animalia
- Phylum: Arthropoda
- Class: Insecta
- Order: Lepidoptera
- Family: Crambidae
- Genus: Mestolobes
- Species: M. quadrifascia

Binomial name
- Mestolobes quadrifascia (Swezey, 1934)

Synonyms
- Promylaea quadrifascia Swezey, 1934

Species of moth

Mestolobes quadrifascia is a moth of the family Crambidae described by Otto Herman Swezey in 1934. It is endemic to the Hawaiian island of Kauai.
