= Joseph Spear =

Captain Joseph Spear
- Born: Weymouth, Dorset, United Kingdom
- Died: 1837
- Military career
- Allegiance: United Kingdom of Great Britain and Ireland
- Branch: Royal Navy
- Service years: 1779–1837
- Rank: Post-captain
- Commands: HMS Lily; HMS Chichester; HMS Ethalion; HMS Dart; HMS Northumberland; HMS Agamemnon; HMS Nimrod; HMS Goree; HMS Royal Sovereign; HMS Temeraire
- Conflicts: American Revolutionary War; Action of 8 January 1780; Relief of Gibraltar; Battle of Cape St. Vincent; Battle of the Saintes; French Revolutionary Wars; Napoleonic Wars; Caribbean campaign; Invasion of Martinique

Joseph Spear (died 1837) was an officer of the Royal Navy who served during the American War of Independence, and the French Revolutionary and Napoleonic Wars.

Spear joined the Royal Navy during the American War of Independence and soon saw action at several of the largest fleet actions of the war. He was with Rodney's fleet at the relief of Gibraltar, fighting at the capture of the Caracas convoy, the Battle of Cape St. Vincent and then at the capture of a French warship and her convoy. His ship was again in action with a Dutch ship in the Channel, before Spear went out to the West Indies and saw action at the Battle of the Saintes. It was the start of an enduring connection with the Caribbean, where Spear spent the most active part of his career.

Continuing in active service during the years of peace, Spear rose to lieutenant and served on a number of ships during the French Revolutionary Wars. He was promoted to commander late in the wars, and was assigned to the West Indies on the outbreak of the Napoleonic Wars. He commanded several sloops and unrated vessels with distinction, alternating with active service in command of larger ships of the line and frigates during the West Indies Campaign. He fought a particularly fierce action with a superior French force, for which he received plaudits from his commanding officer, and supported the Invasion of Martinique. His reward was to carry despatches to Britain, for which he was promoted to post-captain. Service with the Mediterranean Fleet followed, commanding ships of the line and blockading the French in Toulon. Ill health brought an end to his active service, and he returned to Britain in 1812. He did not live long enough to receive a promotion to flag rank and died in 1837, still a post-captain.

== Early life ==
Spear was born in Weymouth, Dorset and entered the Royal Navy in 1779, joining the 74-gun HMS Marlborough as a midshipman. The Marlborough was commanded at this time by Captain Taylor Penny, also from Weymouth, and a previous acquaintance was probably responsible for Spear obtaining a position on the ship. Marlborough was one of the ships assigned to the fleet under Sir George Brydges Rodney and sent to relieve Gibraltar in early 1780. Spear's ship was in action several times within a few months, firstly at the interception and capture of a convoy of Spanish ships of the Caracas Company on 8 January, and then at the Battle of Cape St. Vincent on 16 January. Marlborough was then detached with a small squadron under Admiral Robert Digby and ordered to escort a convoy to Menorca. While returning to Britain from Gibraltar, Digby's squadron came across the French 64-gun Protée, escorting a fleet of transports bound for Mauritius. The Protée and three transports were duly captured.

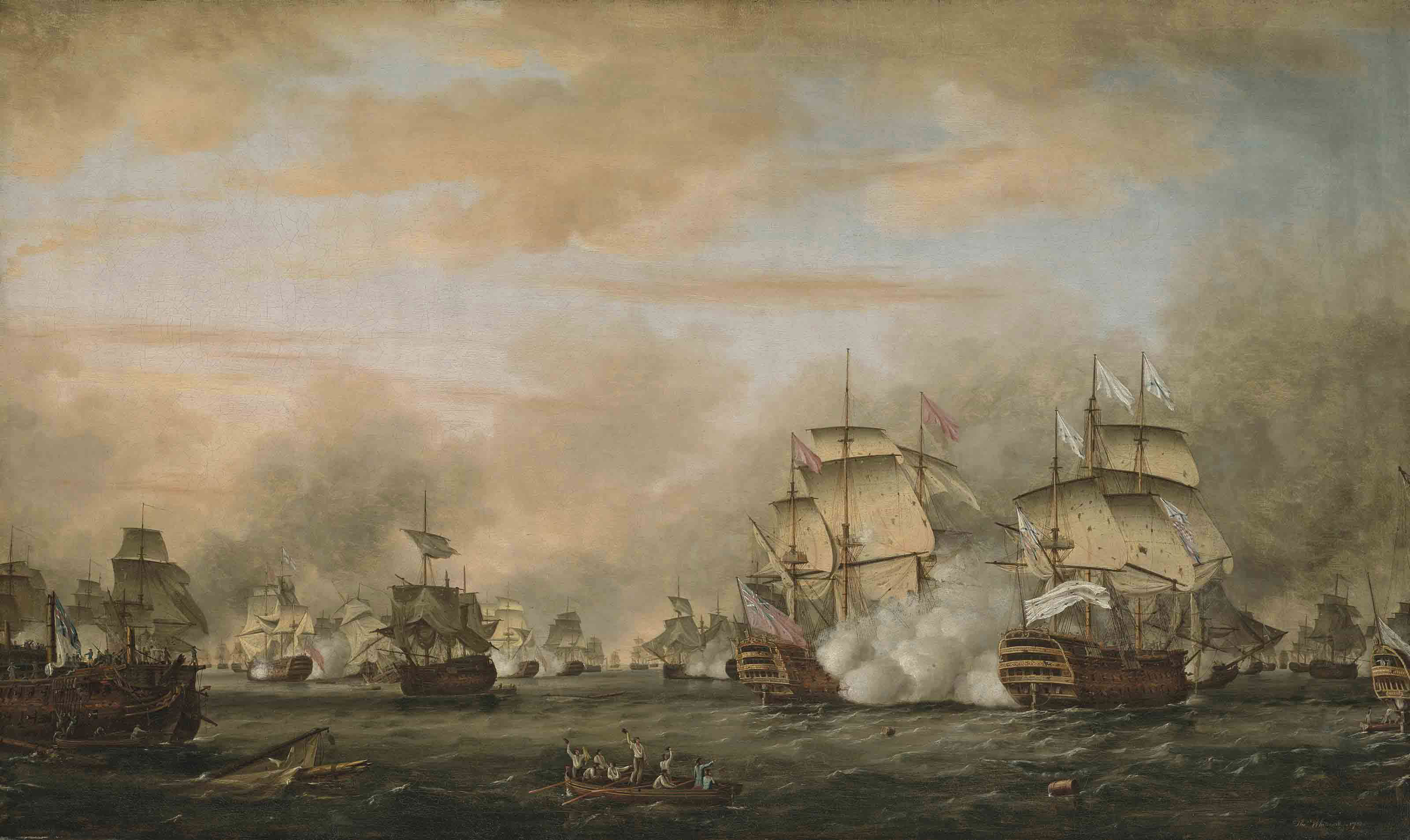
The Battle of the Saintes, 12 April 1782: surrender of the Ville de Paris by Thomas Whitcombe, painted 1783, shows Hood's HMS Barfleur, centre, attacking the French flagship Ville de Paris, right.

Spear then served in the Western Approaches for the rest of 1780, where Marlborough was again in action at the end of the year, capturing the Dutch 64-gun Prinses Carolina on 30 December 1780. 1781 was spent with the Western squadron, and in January 1782 Spear sailed with his ship for the West Indies with Rodney's fleet. Marlborough was in action at the Battle of the Saintes on 12 April 1782, sustaining casualties of three killed and sixteen wounded. Following the British victory at the Saintes, Marlborough sailed to North America with Admiral Hugh Pigot in July, and spent between September and October at New York. She was then active in the blockade of Cap-François for the remainder of the war. Following the signing and ratification of the Treaty of Paris, the war came to an end and Marlborough sailed back to Britain to be paid off. Spear left the ship and managed to find further employment in the navy.

Spear served first aboard the sloop HMS Orestes, later transferring to the 64-gun HMS Ardent and then to the 74-gun HMS Bellona. It was while serving on Bellona that Spear received his promotion to lieutenant, on 15 October 1790. He went on to serve on the East Indies station as first-lieutenant of the sloop HMS Swan.

== French Revolutionary Wars ==
Spear returned to Britain after the outbreak of the French Revolutionary Wars, and received postings to a number of ships. He was first aboard the 74-gun HMS Audacious, but later transferred to the 28-gun HMS Triton. His later ships were the 74-gun HMS Saturn and the 50-gun HMS Jupiter. Spear was serving aboard the latter vessel when she was used to carry Caroline of Brunswick from Cuxhaven to Greenwich in March 1795 for her marriage to the Prince of Wales. He then served aboard the 64-gun HMS St Albans, the flagship of Vice-Admiral George Vandeput at Halifax. Vandeput promoted Spear to his first command, making him master and commander of the sloop HMS Lily in March 1799.

He remained in command of Lily until 1802, when he transferred to HMS Chichester, a former 44-gun frigate, now armed en flûte, and sailed her back to Britain in February 1803. Britain had been temporarily at peace with France after the signing of the Treaty of Amiens, but with the outbreak of war in March 1803, Spear was ordered back to the West Indies, transporting the second battalion of the Royal Scots from Portsmouth to Barbados in June 1803. He landed the troops successfully in Carlisle Bay, and happened to notice a brig passing by flying Dutch colours. Anticipating that war with the Batavian Republic was imminent, Spear sent his boats out and detained the Dutch ship. Two days later Commodore Samuel Hood arrived with despatches announcing that all Dutch ships were to be seized. Hood thanked Spear for his timely action, and the brig, Vrow Elizabeth, and her cargo of coffee and cotton, were sold for £20,000 in prize money.

== Napoleonic Wars ==
With the resumption of the wars, Spear took an active part in the campaign against French and Dutch possessions in the West Indies. He supported the reductions of Saint Lucia, Tobago, Demerara, Essequibo and Berbice, and afterwards escorted a convoy from Tortola to Britain. After refitting Chichester, Spear returned to the Leeward Islands to serve under the station commander, Rear-Admiral Alexander Cochrane. Cochrane appointed him to several temporary acting commands, at first to the 36-gun HMS Ethalion. While commanding the Ethalion he recaptured the British ship Eliza, which had been captured while carrying provisions from Cork to Antigua. Spear was appointed to command the experimental sloop HMS Dart in January 1806. Spear's command of Dart was briefly interrupted by a further acting commission, this time as captain of Cochrane's flagship, the 74-gun HMS Northumberland. Spear took part in the pursuit of a French squadron in June 1806 which had recently arrived in the Caribbean under Jean-Baptiste Philibert Willaumez, and was again moved from his ship, this time to become acting captain of the 74-gun HMS Agamemnon.

Returning to command Dart during the second half of 1806, Spear captured the 8-gun schooner privateer Jeune Gabriella on 9 November 1806, and also recaptured a brig bound from Halifax to Trinidad with a cargo of fish. Dart was sailing in company with the sloop HMS Wolverine during these events. Spear was transferred to take command of the sloop HMS Nimrod in 1807, and continued to operate with success against privateers, capturing the 5-gun Nouvelle Entreprise on 27 December 1807. He also captured the Spanish packet ship Firmeza during his time with Nimrod.

=== Goree vs Pylade and Palinure ===
In early 1808 Spear was transferred to take command of the sloop HMS Goree, aboard which he continued in the West Indies. While lying at anchor off Marie-Galante on 22 April 1808, two brigs were spotted sailing northwards. Spear determined that they were enemies after they made no response to his private signal, and set off in pursuit. The two brigs, mounting 16 guns each and so constituting the superior force, hauled up and fired on Goree, badly damaging her sails and rigging, and disabling her. They were then forced to flee when another British ship, the 14-gun HMS Superiere arrived on the scene. Goree had one man killed and four wounded in the brief engagement, while the two brigs had combined losses of eight killed and twenty-one wounded. The brigs were later discovered to be the French Pylade and Palinure. Palinure was later captured, causing Sir Alexander Cochrane to write in his report "the last of the two [Palinure] which were so gallantly beaten by His Majesty's sloop Goree." (Note: Pylade was captured off Martinique on 20 October 1808 by HMS Pompee and brought into service as HMS Vimiera. Palinure was captured off Diamond Rock on 1 November 1808 by HMS Circe and brought into service as HMS Snap.) On his return to Marie-Galante Spear came ashore to be received by the entire garrison drawn up presenting arms, drums playing a march and fifes playing "Rule, Britannia!" Cochrane wrote a personal letter to Spear saying "I am sorry that the spirit and gallantry displayed by yourself, officers, and crew, did not meet with the success which you all so evidently deserved". Though the action was unsuccessful and therefore not gazetted, the Admiralty acknowledged Spear's deed by confirming the appointment of his acting second-lieutenant Thomas Clack.

Spear was then to have transferred from Goree to the sloop HMS Fawn, pursuant to orders brought out by Commander George Alfred Crofton. Crofton was to supersede Spear in command of Goree, but Crofton observed that "as a battle often caused officers and men to become more strongly attached to each other, Captain Spear would probably wish to continue in the Goree; in which case he himself had no objection whatever to take the Fawn". Cochrane approved the gesture, writing out two commissions for Spear and Crofton, leaving the names of the ships blank to allow them to come to a mutual agreement. Spear chose to remain with Goree and Crofton instead took command of Fawn.

Goree, with Spear still in command, made one more important capture in 1808, taking the eight-gun privateer General Villaret on 24 November. General Villaret was carrying a cargo of sugar, coffee and cotton at the time of her capture. Spear then assisted in the Invasion of Martinique in early 1809, and was given the honour of carrying Cochrane's despatches back to London, with Cochrane's instructions to the Lords of the Admiralty to apply to Spear for more information, describing him as "an old and deserving commander". He arrived on 12 April 1809 and was promptly promoted to post-captain the following day.

== Captaincy ==
Spear received his first appointment as a post-captain in April 1810, when he was given command of the 100-gun HMS Royal Sovereign. He commanded her in the Mediterranean Fleet under Admiral Sir Charles Cotton, maintaining the blockade of Toulon. In March 1811 he was appointed to command the 98-gun HMS Temeraire, the flagship of Rear-Admiral Francis Pickmore, and for the most part the blockade was uneventful. Though possessing a powerful fleet, the French commander avoided any contact with the blockading force and stayed in port, or else made very short voyages, returning to the harbour when the British appeared.

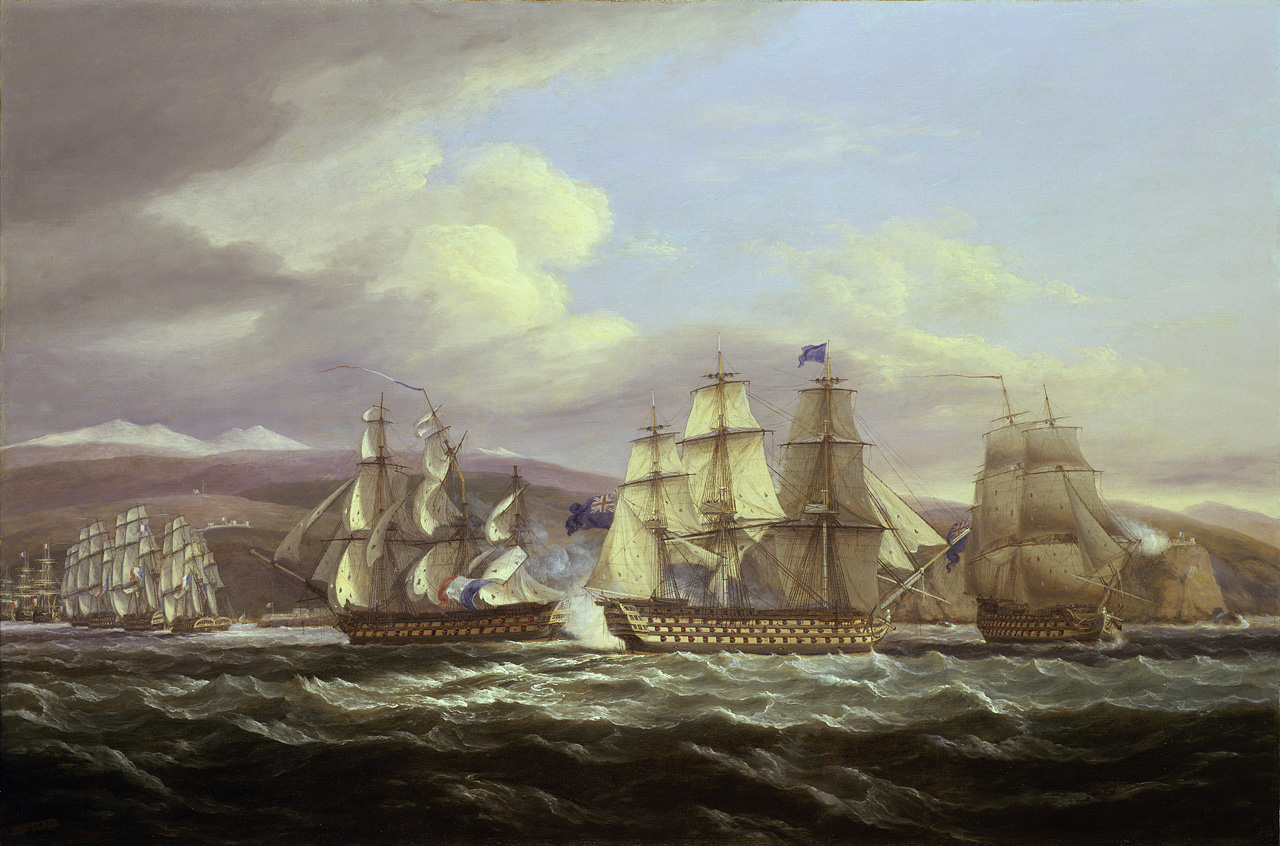
The Mediterranean Fleet blockading Toulon, an 1830 painting by Thomas Luny

Temeraire's one brush with the French during this period came on 13 August 1811. Having received orders to sail to Menorca, Spear attempted to tack out of Hyères Bay. As he tried to do so, the wind fell away, leaving Temeraire becalmed and caught in a current which caused her to drift towards land. She came under fire from a shore battery on Pointe des Medes, which wounded several of her crew. The most serious casualty was her master, Robert Duncan, who had one of his legs shot off as he stood talking to Spear. Temeraire's boats were quickly manned, and together with boats sent from the squadron, she was towed out of range of the French guns. She then sailed to Menorca and underwent repairs. During this period an epidemic of yellow fever broke out, infecting nearly the entire crew and killing around a hundred crewmen. Spear was one of those badly affected, and the commander in chief of the Mediterranean Fleet, Sir Edward Pellew, ordered him back to Britain with his ship. Health gradually improved as she sailed through the Atlantic. Spear was to have commanded Temeraire's replacement in the Mediterranean, the 100-gun HMS Royal George, but his ill health prevented this.

== Family and later life ==
Despite his eventful career, his low position on the seniority lists meant that Spear never lived to be promoted to flag rank. He died in 1837, still a post-captain. He had been twice married, marrying his first wife Grace Grant, a descendant of Charles Gordon, 2nd Earl of Aboyne, in 1809. After her death he married Grace Grant, a cousin of his first wife.
