= Mestolobes xanthoscia =

Scientific classification
- Domain: Eukaryota
- Kingdom: Animalia
- Phylum: Arthropoda
- Class: Insecta
- Order: Lepidoptera
- Family: Crambidae
- Genus: Mestolobes
- Species: M. xanthoscia

Binomial name
- Mestolobes xanthoscia Meyrick, 1899

Species of moth

Mestolobes xanthoscia is a moth of the family Crambidae described by Edward Meyrick in 1899. It is endemic to the Hawaiian islands of Oahu, Molokai and Hawaii.

Adults have been seen visiting the flowers of Metrosideros species.
