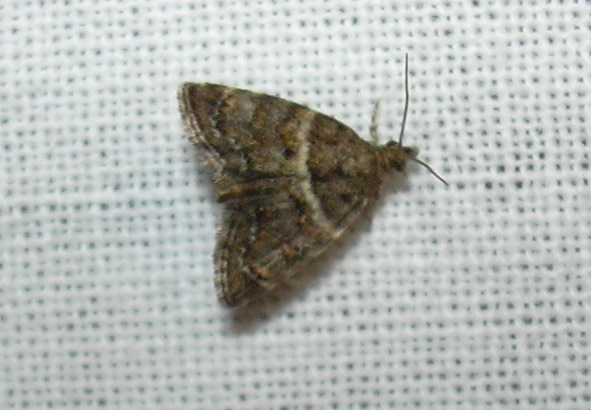
- Mestolobes minuscula

Scientific classification
- Domain: Eukaryota
- Kingdom: Animalia
- Phylum: Arthropoda
- Class: Insecta
- Order: Lepidoptera
- Family: Crambidae
- Subfamily: Crambinae
- Tribe: incertae sedis
- Genus: Mestolobes; Butler, 1882

Synonyms
- Promylaea Meyrick, 1899

= Mestolobes =

Genus of moths

Mestolobes is a genus of moths of the family Crambidae described by Arthur Gardiner Butler in 1882. All species are endemic to the Hawaiian Islands.

== Species ==
- Mestolobes abnormis (Butler, 1882)
- Mestolobes amethystias Meyrick, 1899
- Mestolobes antichora Meyrick, 1904
- Mestolobes aphrias Meyrick, 1899
- Mestolobes arctura Meyrick, 1899
- Mestolobes autodoxa Meyrick, 1899
- Mestolobes banausa Meyrick, 1899
- Mestolobes chimonias Meyrick, 1899
- Mestolobes chlorolychna Meyrick, 1899
- Mestolobes chrysomolybda Meyrick, 1899
- Mestolobes chrysomolybdoides Swezey, 1920
- Mestolobes droseropa Meyrick, 1899
- Mestolobes epidelta Meyrick, 1899
- Mestolobes erinnys Meyrick, 1899
- Mestolobes eurylyca Meyrick, 1899
- Mestolobes homalopa Meyrick, 1899
- Mestolobes iochrysa Meyrick, 1899
- Mestolobes mesacma Meyrick, 1899
- Mestolobes minuscula (Butler, 1881)
- Mestolobes ochrias Meyrick, 1899
- Mestolobes ombrias Meyrick, 1899
- Mestolobes orthrias Meyrick, 1899
- Mestolobes perixantha Meyrick, 1899
- Mestolobes pessias Meyrick, 1899
- Mestolobes pragmatica Meyrick, 1899
- Mestolobes pyropa (Meyrick, 1899)
- Mestolobes quadrifascia (Swezey, 1934)
- Mestolobes quadrifasciata Swezey, 1920
- Mestolobes scleropis Meyrick, 1899
- Mestolobes semiochrea Butler, 1882
- Mestolobes sicaria Meyrick, 1904
- Mestolobes sirina Meyrick, 1899
- Mestolobes xanthoscia Meyrick, 1899
