= HMS Chichester (1785) =

Fifth-rate ship of the Royal Navy, in service 1785–1815

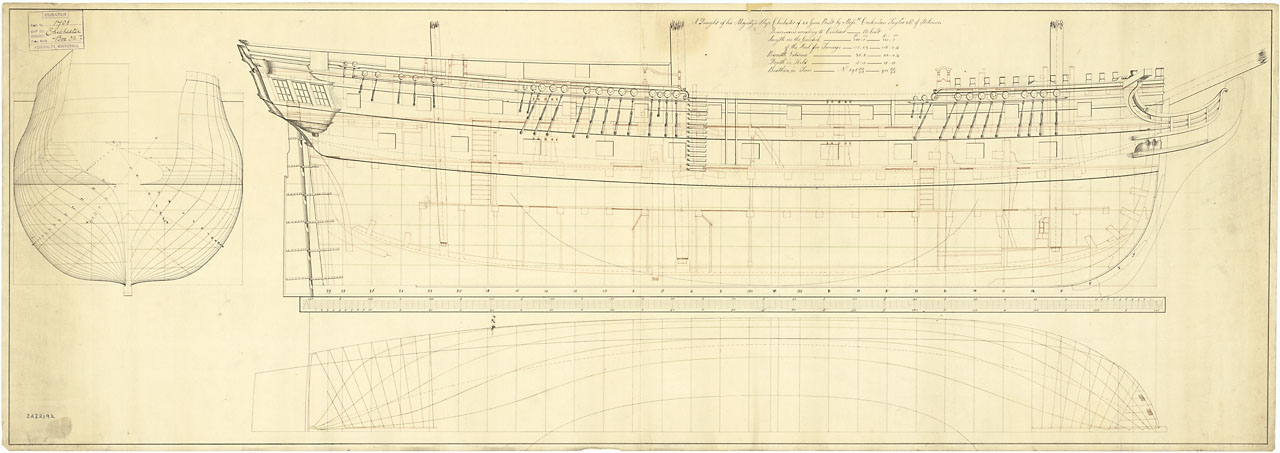

History

Great Britain
- Name: HMS Chichester
- Ordered: 13 May 1782
- Builder: Crookenden, Taylor and Smith
- Cost: £12,464.16.01
- Laid down: August 1782
- Launched: 10 March 1785
- Commissioned: April 1785
- Fate: Broken up, July 1815

General characteristics
- Class & type: Adventure-class ship
- Tons burthen: 901 90/94 (bm)
- Length: 140 ft 0 in (42.7 m) (gundeck); 115 ft 0 1/4 in (35.1 m) (keel)
- Beam: 38 ft 4 3/4 in (11.7 m)
- Depth of hold: 16 ft 10 in (5.1 m)
- Propulsion: Sails
- Armament: Upper deck: 20 × 9-pounder guns; Quarterdeck: 2 × 6-pounder guns

HMS Chichester was a two-deck, fifth-rate ship of the Royal Navy. One of the Adventure-class ships designed by Edward Hunt, she was built to carry 44 guns but for her entire career she served as a troopship, never carrying more than 22. In 1803, she was part of the squadron under Samuel Hood that captured the French held islands of St Lucia and Tobago, and the Dutch colonies of Demerara, Essequibo and Berbice.

== Design, construction and armament ==
Edward Hunt designed his Adventure class as a marginally broader contender to Thomas Slade's successful 44-gun Roebuck class. The two-deck ships were intended to be 896 bm, with a battery 22 × 24-pounder (11 kg) carronades on the lower deck and 20 × 18-pounder (8.2 kg) carronades on the upper deck but most of the class, including Chichester, were built and commissioned as transport or store ships, carrying either 20 or 22 guns and, from 1793, those serving as warships, swapped the carronades for long guns; 20 × 18 pounders (8.2 kg) on the lower deck and 22 × 12 pounders (5.4 kg) on the upper deck.

Chichester was ordered on 13 May 1782 and her keel of 115 feet 2 1/2 inches (35 m) was laid down in August at Itchenor, West Sussex, under the instruction of shipwrights Crookenden, Taylor and Smith. As built, she was 140 feet (43 m) long at the gundeck, with a beam of 38 feet 4 3/4 inches (11.7 m) and a depth in the hold of 16 feet 10 inches (5 m). She measured 901 90/94 bm. When launched on 10 March 1785, she had cost £12,464.16.1d. She was completed for ordinary in April, for a further £4,347.

== Service ==
Chichester was first commissioned as a troopship in 1787 and fitted out as such for £1,825. Her commander, appointed in October, was Lieutenant Henry Bridges. In January 1788, she transported troops to the West Indies. By September she had returned to England and was being refitted at Woolwich Dockyard at a cost of £3,178. In April the following year, a further £4,523 was paid out when she was fitted out again at Portsmouth. Under Lieutenant Charles Craven, she then took troops to Halifax in May.

Chichester was called upon to deliver more troops to the West Indies in 1791, under Lieutenant Charles Price. In 1793, following Britain's entry into the French Revolutionary War, Chichester was repurposed as a storeship at Portsmouth. Captain Robert Fancourt took command in October while alterations to Chichester were ongoing. Works were completed in May 1794, the final bill being £6,175, and she sailed back to the West Indies in June. While off St Domingo in August, Chichester and the 64-gun HMS Intrepid took the French corvette, Sirenne.

Fancourt returned Chichester to England in February 1795 where she underwent another refit in July. The work was carried out at Woolwich and cost £4,977, after which she was taken to the Mediterranean. While there, on 24 May, she captured the Christian Kaab. Chichester returned home in August 1796 where, in November, she was recommissioned by Commander Andrew Hollis and another £4,069 was spent on refitting at Woolwich. This was completed in January 1797 and in February she sailed to the Cape of Good Hope, returning home in November 1798, under Commander John Gardner who had been appointed in March. Lieutenant John Steven took command in December and sailed her to the Mediterranean in June 1799. Another refit, costing £6,808, was undertaken at Woolwich in June and August 1800. Chichester was sent to Jamaica in July 1802. Steven died in October and was replaced in November by William Campton who took the ship to Halifax, Nova Scotia, before sailing her home.

War broke out again in May 1803 following the short-lived Peace of Amiens and by June, Chichester, under the command of Lieutenant Richard Thomas, had joined Samuel Hood's squadron in the Leeward Islands. Later that month, she took part in the capture of St Lucia and Tobago.

Chichester left Barbados on 20 June in the company of Hood's 74-gun flagship HMS Centaur, the 74-gun Courageux, the frigate Argo and the sloops Hornet and Cyane. The invasion force was joined the following morning by HMS Emerald and the 18-gun sloop Osprey. By 11:00, the squadron was anchored in Choc Bay. The troops were landed by 17:00 and half an hour later the town of Castries capitulated. In the island's main fortress, Morne-Fortunée, the French troops refused to surrender; the British stormed it at 04:00 on 22 June, and by 04:30 this too was in British hands. Following comparatively easy take-over, the British attacked Tobago, which surrendered on 1 July. Hood then began operations against Dutch possessions.

On 10 August 1803, Chichester captured the Dutch ship Burton, carrying sugar and cotton, and in September, she assisted in the invasions of the colonies of Demarara, Essequibo and Berbice. All of which had been captured by the end of the month. The ships chosen for this expedition set out from Barbados again on 1 September. They did not arrive at their rendezvous point, off the mouth of the Essequibo river, until 18 September however due to very light winds. A summons was immediately dispatched to the Dutch governor, under a flag of truce. The two largest ships, Chichester and Centaur were unable to enter the river so the troops were disembarked into smaller boats. The following day, a Dutch party arrived and terms for the surrender were agreed. The governor of Demerara and Essequibo was unable to treat for Berbice so another deputation had to be sent. The colony was eventually taken without a fight on 27 September.

Under Commander Joseph Spear in April 1804, Chichester sailed to the West Indies en flute; returning to England later in the year. She was recommissioned under Lieutenant Edward Stopford in September 1806, for service in the Leeward Islands, paying off in August 1807 and laid up in ordinary. In March 1810, she was transferred to the West India Dock Company in March 1810 and broken up at Woolwich July 1815. Chichester never carried the full 44-gun armament she was designed for; she spent her entire Royal Navy career as a transport ship with her lower deck guns removed and only her 22 upper guns in situ.
