= Sakina (given name) =

Sakina is a feminine given name of Arabic and Hebrew origin.

People with the given name include:

- Sakina bint Husayn (died 735), poet and great-granddaughter of the Islamic prophet Mohammad
- Sakina Aliyeva (1925–2010), Azerbaijani-Soviet stateswoman and politician
- Sakina Itoo (born 1970), Indian politician
- Sakina Jaffrey (born 1962), American actress
- Sakina Karchaoui (born 1996), French professional footballer
- Sakina Sheikh (born 1990), British politician

Fictional characters include:

- Sakina, from the animated film Wish

== See also ==
- Sarina (given name)
- Sabrina (given name)
