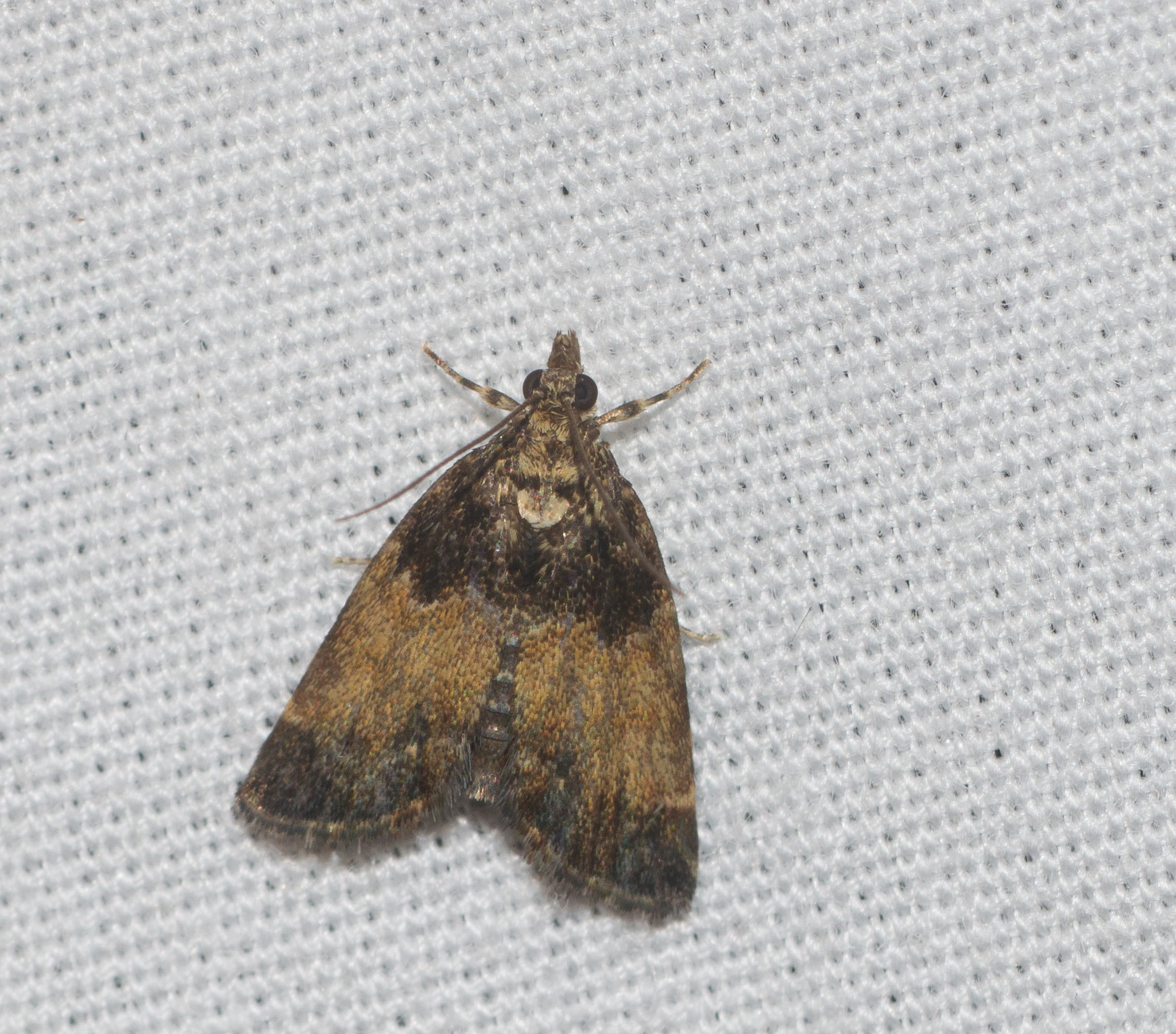

Scientific classification
- Domain: Eukaryota
- Kingdom: Animalia
- Phylum: Arthropoda
- Class: Insecta
- Order: Lepidoptera
- Family: Crambidae
- Genus: Mestolobes
- Species: M. abnormis

Binomial name
- Mestolobes abnormis (Butler, 1882)

Synonyms
- Metasia abnormis Butler, 1882

= Mestolobes abnormis =

Species of moth

Mestolobes abnormis is a moth of the family Crambidae described by Arthur Gardiner Butler in 1882. It is endemic to the Hawaiian island of Oahu.

Adults have been taken at the flowers of Metrosideros species.
