= Wellington, Florida =

- Village
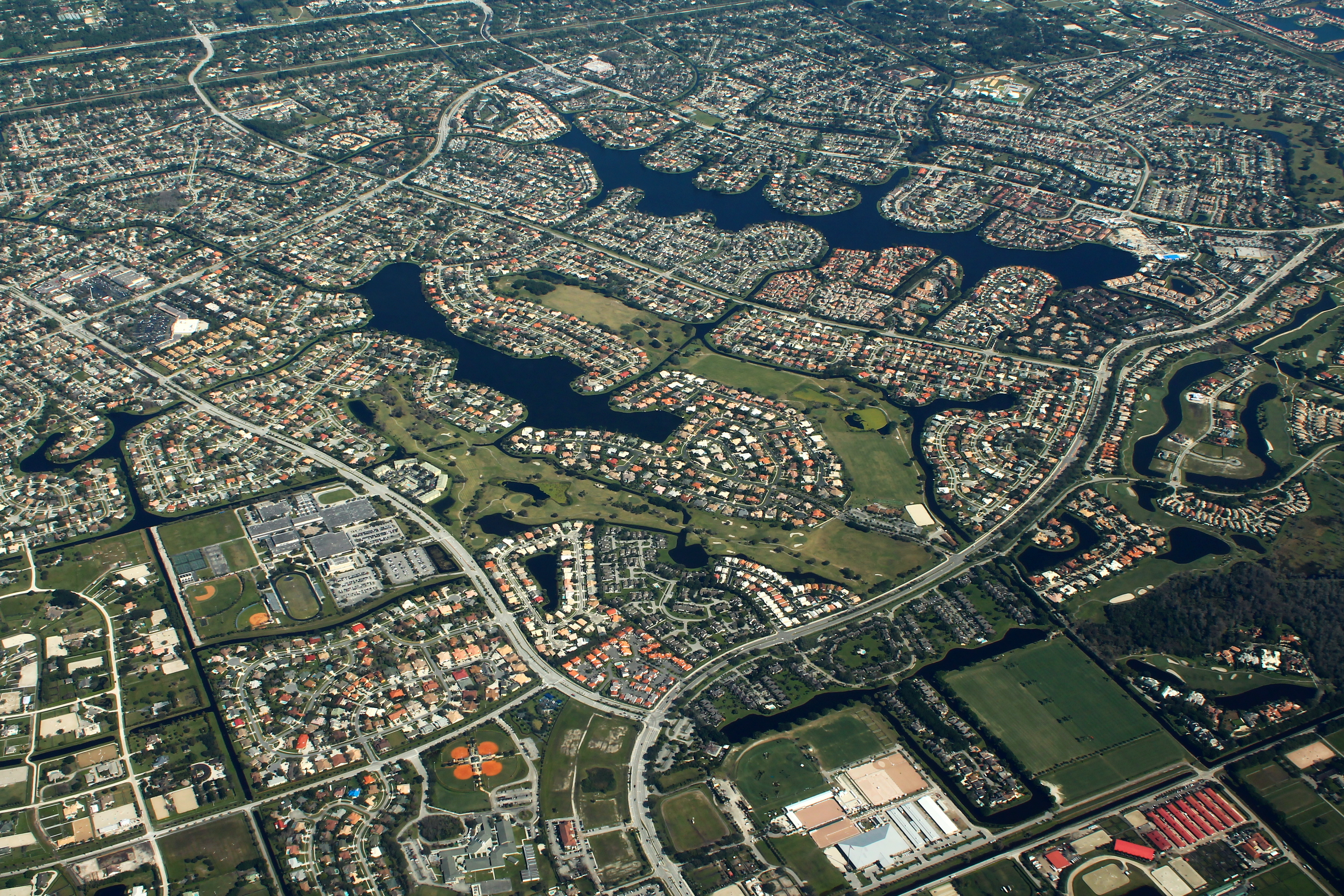

- Flag
- Nickname: "The Winter Equestrian Capital of the World"
- Mottoes: "Unique Hometown, Family Atmosphere, Family Environment", "A Great Hometown...Let Us Show You!"
- Location of Wellington in Palm Beach County, Florida
- Coordinates: 26°37′45″N 80°15′12″W
- Country: United States
- State: Florida
- County: Palm Beach
- Incorporated: December 31, 1995

Government
  - Type: Council-Manager

Area
  - Village: 45.41 sq mi (117.62 km^{2})
  - Land: 44.97 sq mi (116.46 km^{2})
  - Water: 0.45 sq mi (1.16 km^{2})
- Elevation: 16 ft (4.9 m)

Population (2020)
  - Village: 61,637
  - Density: 1,370.7/sq mi (529.24/km^{2})
  - Metro: 5,463,857
- Time zone: UTC-5 (EST)
  - Summer (DST): UTC-4 (EDT)
- ZIP codes: 33411, 33414, 33449, 33467
- Area codes: 561, 728
- FIPS code: 12-75812
- GNIS ID: 2407568
- Website: http://wellingtonfl.gov/

Wellington is a village in Palm Beach County and 66 mi (106 km) north of Miami. It is part of the Miami metropolitan area and the fifth largest municipality in Palm Beach County by population. As of the 2020 census, the village had a population of 61,637 according to the U.S. Census Bureau, making it the most populous village in the state.

== History ==
In the 1950s, Charles Oliver Wellington, an accountant from Massachusetts, purchased about 18,000 acres (73 km^{2}) of central Palm Beach County swampland located south of Florida State Road 80 (locally known as Southern Boulevard) and west of U.S. Route 441. Wellington named the property Flying Cow Ranch, due to his other occupation as an aviator and his initials spelling the word "cow". The ranch became protected against floodwaters from the Everglades after the United States Army Corps of Engineers constructed a levee to the south of the property between 1952 and 1953. Following his death in 1959, his son Roger inherited the property. The family sold 1,200 acres (4.9 km^{2}) at $300 per acre to Arthur William "Bink" Glisson, Charles' agent. Glisson sold the land for $1,000 per acre within the following several months. Many other farmers began purchasing or leasing portions of the Flying Cow Ranch in the 1960s. About 2,000 acres (8.1 km^{2}) were used for growing strawberries at one point, which was claimed to be the largest strawberry patch in the world.

After Roger Wellington sold 7,200 acres (29 km^{2}) of land to developer Jim Nall of Fort Lauderdale in 1972, the Palm Beach County Board of Commissioners unanimously approved a proposal by the Acme Drainage District for the area to become a planned unit development. Among the first projects included the development of 150 acre (0.61 km^{2}) Lake Wellington and the construction of a golf course, a country club, and residential neighborhoods. Following acquisition of the project in the late 1970s by Gould Florida Inc., the company built the International Polo Club Palm Beach and the Aero Club, a neighborhood with a private airpark. The area's first official population count occurred during the 1980 census, when Wellington was defined as a Census-designated place. A total of 4,622 people lived there at the time. Wellington functioned as a sprawling bedroom community with few shopping centers or restaurants until the 1990s.

A vote for incorporation of the village of Wellington was held on November 7, 1995, with 3,851 votes in support and 3,713 votes in opposition, a margin of just 138 votes. Wellington officially became a village on December 31, 1995, as a state revenue sharing program required it to exist in 1995 in order to be eligible for funding in 1996. The village became Palm Beach County's 38th municipality and the ninth most populous city in the county at the time, with approximately 28,000 residents. The first village council elections were held on March 12, 1996. None of the candidates for any of the five seats secured a majority of the votes, forcing runoffs to be held on March 26. The first elected village council members were Paul Adams, Michael McDonough, Tom Wenham, Carmine Priore, and Kathy Foster. Two days later, the council held its first meeting and selected Foster for mayor, Priore for vice mayor, and Colin Baenziger for village manager.

It has now become known as an international center for equestrian sports.

On October 9, 2024, the town was hit by an EF3 tornado spawned by Hurricane Milton, which caused significant damage in the community, as well as in nearby Loxahatchee Groves, Palm Beach Gardens, and The Acreage.

== Geography ==
According to the United States Census Bureau, the village has a total area of 31.4 square miles (81 km^{2}), of which 31.0 square miles (80 km^{2}) is land and 0.3 square miles (0.78 km^{2}) is water (0.99%).

=== Climate ===
As typical in Palm Beach County and South Florida, Wellington has a tropical climate, with two main seasons: warm and dry and hot and wet.

Winters are mild to warm and humidity levels are relatively low. During the coolest month, January, average high temperatures are around 75 °F (24 °C) and lows around 55 °F (13 °C). It is not unusual though for winter temperatures to reach 83 °F (28 °C).

Summertime is rainy season in South Florida and humidity levels increase dramatically. During the hottest month, July, high temperatures are around 92 °F (33 °C) with lows around 75 °F (24 °C). South Florida is vulnerable to hurricanes at this time of year.

== Demographics ==
Historical population
Census	Pop.	Note	%±
1980	4,622		—
1990	20,670		347.2%
2000	38,216		84.9%
2010	56,508		47.9%
2020	61,637		9.1%
U.S. Decennial Census

=== Racial and ethnic composition ===
Wellington racial composition (Hispanics excluded from racial categories) (NH = Non-Hispanic)
Race	Pop 2010	Pop 2020	% 2010	% 2020
White (NH)	36,605	34,308	64.78%	55.66%
Black or African American (NH)	5,626	6,500	9.96%	10.55%
Native American or Alaska Native (NH)	48	55	0.08%	0.09%
Asian (NH)	2,144	3,195	3.79%	5.18%
Pacific Islander or Native Hawaiian (NH)	19	15	0.03%	0.02%
Some other race (NH)	165	417	0.29%	0.68%
Two or more races/Multiracial (NH)	949	2,235	1.68%	3.63%
Hispanic or Latino (any race)	10,952	14,912	19.38%	24.19%
Total	56,508	61,637		

=== 2020 census ===
As of the 2020 census, Wellington had a population of 61,637. The median age was 42.1 years. 23.6% of residents were under the age of 18 and 16.6% of residents were 65 years of age or older. For every 100 females there were 92.1 males, and for every 100 females age 18 and over there were 88.0 males age 18 and over.

99.3% of residents lived in urban areas, while 0.7% lived in rural areas.

There were 21,638 households in Wellington, of which 38.6% had children under the age of 18 living in them. Of all households, 59.5% were married-couple households, 11.4% were households with a male householder and no spouse or partner present, and 23.7% were households with a female householder and no spouse or partner present. About 17.5% of all households were made up of individuals and 7.9% had someone living alone who was 65 years of age or older.

There were 24,002 housing units, of which 9.8% were vacant. The homeowner vacancy rate was 1.5% and the rental vacancy rate was 10.0%.

According to the 2020 ACS 5-year estimates, there were 16,654 families residing in the village.

=== Income and poverty ===
As of 2015, the median income for a household in the village was $77,233. The per capita income for the village was $40,726. About 2.9% of families and 4.3% of the population were below the poverty line, including 4.2% of those under age 18 and 3.8% of those age 65 or over.

=== 2010 census ===
As of the 2010 United States census, there were 56,508 people, 17,680 households, and 13,916 families residing in the village.

=== 2000 census ===
In 2000, there were 12,938 households, out of which 69.7% were married couples, 47.2% had children under the age of 18 living with them, 9.7% had a female householder with no husband present, and 17.4% were non-families. 13.2% of all households were made up of individuals, and 4.0% had someone living alone who was 65 years of age or older. The average household size was 2.95 and the average family size was 3.25.

In 2000, the village the population was spread out, with 31.0% under the age of 18, 5.8% from 18 to 24, 29.7% from 25 to 44, 24.6% from 45 to 64, and 8.9% who were 65 years of age or older. The median age was 37 years. For every 100 females, there were 95.5 males. For every 100 females age 18 and over, there were 91.6 males.

As of 2000, the median income for a household in the village was $70,271, and the median income for a family was $77,078. Males had a median income of $53,244 versus $33,088 for females. The per capita income for the village was $30,726. About 2.9% of families and 4.3% of the population were below the poverty line, including 4.2% of those under age 18 and 3.8% of those age 65 or over.

As of 2000, 83.52% of residents spoke English as a first language, while 12.18% spoke Spanish, French accounted for 0.98%, French Creole for 0.79%, Italian made up 0.61%, and Vietnamese was the mother tongue of 0.47% of the population.

As of 2000, Wellington had the eighty-fifth highest percentage of Cuban residents in the US, with 3.27% of the village's population.

== Arts and culture ==
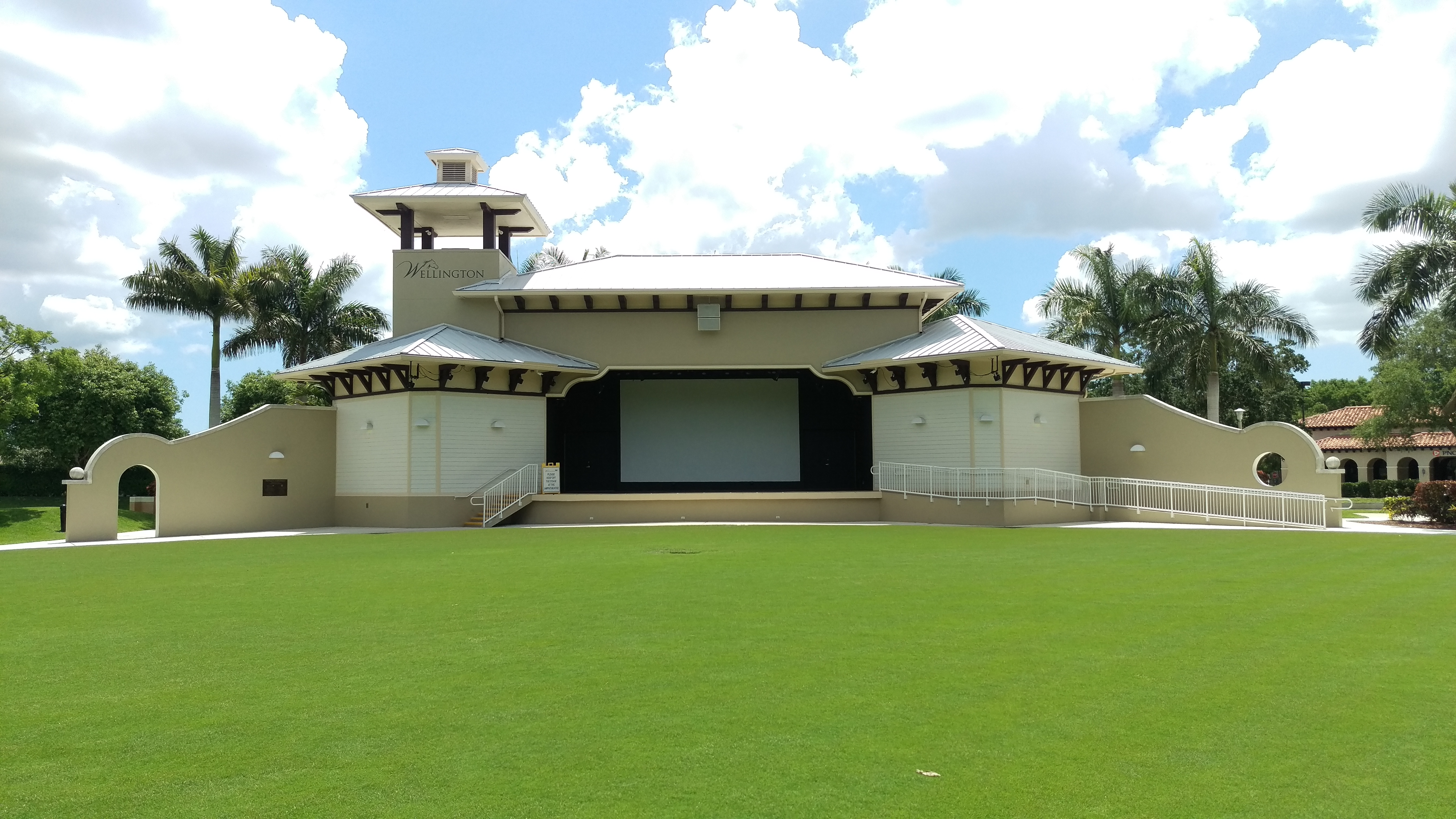
Wellington Amphitheater

The Wellington Amphitheater hosts movie nights, musical and comedy performances, and the Food Truck Invasion.

The Mall at Wellington Green, and the Old Wellington Mall, are located in Wellington.

The Palm Beach County Library System operates the Wellington Branch.

== Parks and recreation ==
=== Equestrian sporting events ===
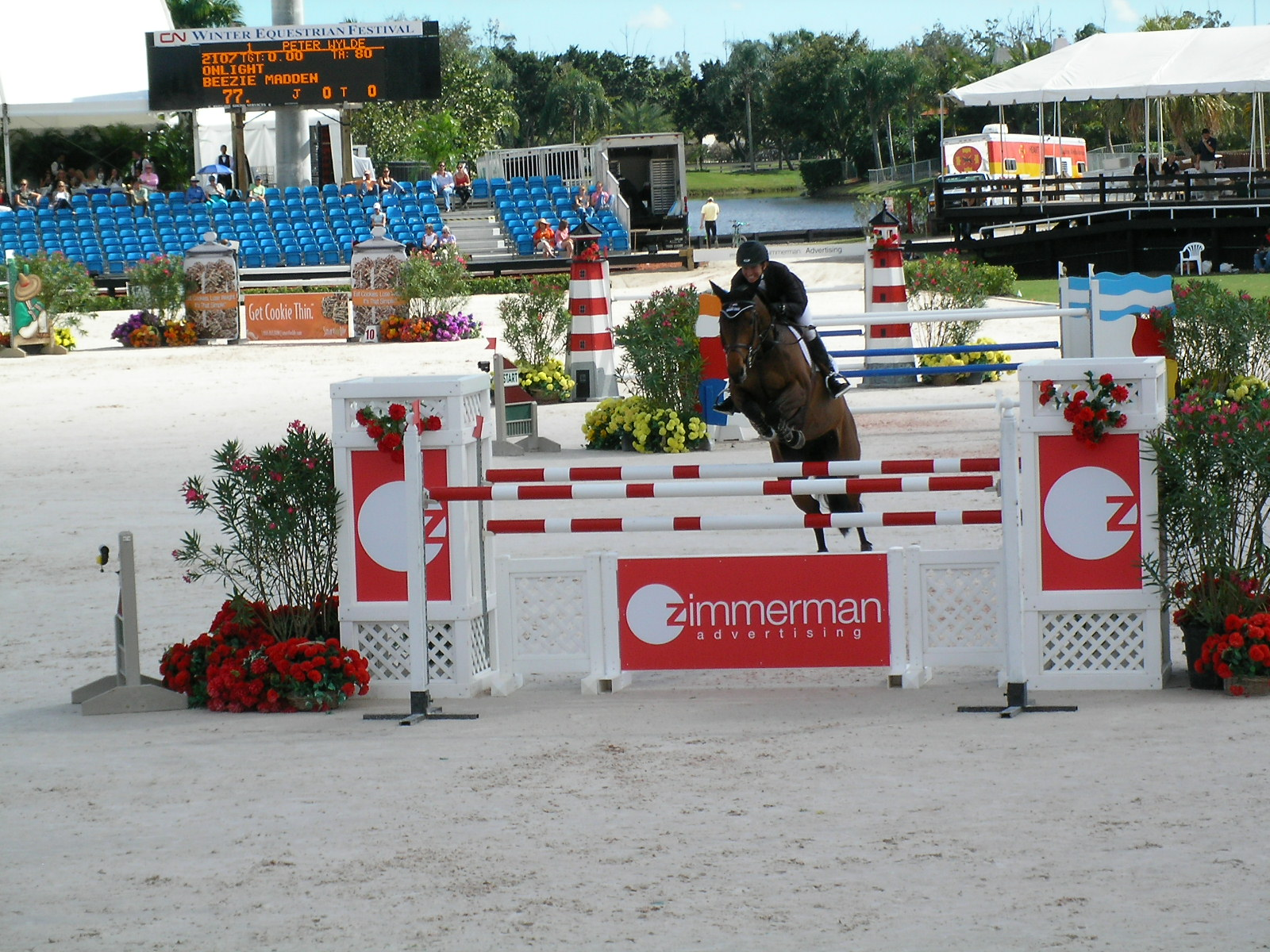
Beezie Madden and Onlight, Grand Prix competition at the FTI Winter Equestrian Festival, Wellington, Florida.

Wellington is known for its equestrian community and hosting equestrian events, notably show jumping, hunting, dressage and polo.

Wellington is host to the Winter Equestrian Festival, the largest and longest running horse show in the world from January to April. It holds more than forty weeks of equestrian competitions per year. A new expansion includes the Global Dressage Festival, begun in 2011. International competitors attend the equestrian events and social event held in the community.

Each year Wellington hosts several high-goal polo tournaments including the USPA Gold Cup and the U.S. Open Polo Championship at the Palm Beach International Polo Club. The International Polo Club was an idea created by players to build a facility to showcase the skills of the ponies and players. The arenas of play include three state-of-the-art playing fields and a stick and ball field. Brunches, charities, corporate events and more are hosted at the International Polo Club in Wellington.

== Education ==
=== Primary and secondary schools ===
The School District of Palm Beach County serves Wellington. Public schools in Wellington and schools serving Wellington include:

==== Public elementary schools ====
- Wellington Elementary School
- New Horizons Elementary School
- Discovery Key Elementary School
- Binks Forest Elementary School
- Elbridge Gale Elementary School
- Equestrian Trails Elementary School
- Panther Run Elementary School

==== Public middle schools ====
- Wellington Landings Middle School
- Emerald Cove Middle School
- Polo Park Middle School

==== Public high schools ====
- Wellington High School
- Palm Beach Central High School
- Dr. Joaquín García High School

== Media ==
Print/online publications covering Wellington include:

- The Town-Crier Newspaper: First and longest operating local newspaper serving Wellington, Royal Palm Beach, Loxahatchee Groves, and surrounding areas.
- The Palm Beach Post has a reporter dedicated to covering the western communities of Palm Beach County.
- The Sun Sentinel provides limited coverage of Palm Beach County in print and online.
- WPTV-TV, WPEC, and WPBF provide local television news coverage.
- WLRN-FM is the NPR affiliate for South Florida.

== Infrastructure ==
=== Transportation ===
Wellington's public transportation consists of Palm Tran. It is also served by President Donald J. Trump International Airport. Several highways pass through or near Wellington. U.S. Route 441 and State Road 7 jointly cross north-to-south in the eastern side of the village. Lake Worth Road, which is designated as State Road 802 to the east of Route 441/State Road 7, continues westward into Wellington. State Road 882 (locally known as Forest Hill Boulevard) also moves east-west partially through the village, before continuing westward and then northwestward to Southern Boulevard without the designation to the west of Route 441/State Road 7. Southern Boulevard (designated as both U.S. Route 98 and State Road 80), an east-to-west highway, lies just north of the village's northern boundary. Florida's Turnpike passes along the far eastern edge of Wellington, though the nearest entry and exit ramps are located at U.S. Route 98/State Road 80 and State Road 802, outside the municipal limits.

=== Public safety ===
The Village of Wellington receives both fire and police services on a contractual basis from Palm Beach County.

==== Fire and emergency medical services ====
Palm Beach County Fire-Rescue provides fire protection and emergency medical services. There are 4 fire stations assigned to the village.

==== Law enforcement ====
Police protection for Wellington is provided by District 8 of the Palm Beach County Sheriff's Office. District 8 operates from a sub-station located in the village, and is staffed by 68 sworn deputies and 6 civilian employees.

== Notable people ==
- Stephanie Abrams, meteorologist for The Weather Channel in Atlanta, Georgia
- Daniel Bluman (born 1990), Colombian-born Israeli Olympic show jumping rider
- Ashlee Bond (born 1985), American-Israeli Olympic show jumping rider who competes for Israel
- Jon Bostic, NFL linebacker
- Sean Burnett, MLB relief pitcher
- Ian Carey, recording artist and music producer
- Glenn Close, actress
- Fred Couples, golfer (former resident)
- Keith Creel, CEO of Canadian Pacific Railway
- Justin Ellis, soccer player
- Nacho Figueras, polo player and model
- Amy Fisher, the "Long Island Lolita"
- Bill Gates, Microsoft founder (seasonal resident)
- Margie Goldstein-Engle, equestrian
- Arin Hanson, online internet personality
- E. Hunter Harrison, Former CEO of Canadian National Railway, Canadian Pacific Railway and CSX
- Angel Hernandez, MLB umpire
- Tyler Herron (1986–2021), baseball pitcher
- Jessie Hester, former NFL wide receiver, uncle of Devin Hester
- Neil Hirsch, founder of Telerate
- Jeremy Jacobs, owner of NHL's Boston Bruins, Chairman and CEO of Delaware North Companies
- Tommy Lee Jones, actor
- Raymond Kassar, former Chairman and CEO of Atari
- Erin Krakow, actress
- Joan Lunden, broadcaster
- Madonna, singer, actress
- Dave O'Brien, sports broadcaster
- Lou Pai, former CEO of Enron Energy Services
- Cassadee Pope, musician
- Curtis Pride, former MLB outfielder
- J. B. Pritzker, Governor of Illinois
- Rommy Revson, inventor of the scrunchie
- Ann Romney, wife of former U.S. Senator and Massachusetts governor Mitt Romney
- Vanessa Rousso, professional poker player
- Jarrod Saltalamacchia, MLB baseball player
- Patti Scialfa, musician
- Chrystine Tauber, former President of United States Equestrian Federation
- Fred Taylor, retired NFL running back for Jacksonville Jaguars
- Suzie Toot, drag performer
- Vanilla Ice, rapper
- Nick Zano, actor

== See also ==
- The Siren (sculpture)
