= Malabar (1795 ship) =

History

Dutch Republic & Batavian Republic
- Name: Nieuwland
- Operator: Dutch East India Company
- Builder: Amsterdam
- Launched: 1794
- Captured: 1795

Great Britain
- Name: Malabar
- Namesake: Malabar Coast
- Owner: William Hamilton
- Acquired: 1795
- Fate: Burnt in Madras Roads August 1801

General characteristics
- Tons burthen: 872, or 884, or 88423/94 (bm)
- Length: 139 ft 6 in (42.5 m) (overall); 110 ft 0 in (33.5 m) (keel)
- Beam: 38 ft 10 1/2 in (11.8 m)
- Depth of hold: 16 ft 6 in (5.0 m)
- Propulsion: Sails
- Sail plan: Full-rigged ship
- Complement: 1796: 80; 1798: 75; 1800: 70
- Armament: 1796:26 × 9&4-pounder guns; 1798:24 × 9&4-pounder guns; 1800:22 × 9&4-pounder guns
- Notes: Three decks

Malabar was the Nieuwland, launched in 1794 for the Dutch East India Company. The British seized her in 1795 and new owners renamed her Malabar. She made two complete voyages under charter to the British East India Company before she burnt at Madras in 1801 in an accident.

== Origins ==
The Dutch East India Company built Nieuwland at Amsterdam. On 16 December 1795 Nieuwland put into Plymouth on her way home from the Dutch East Indies. Her captain did not know that England and the Batavian Republic were now at war. The British seized Nieuwland and sold her.

== EIC voyages ==
William Hamilton purchased Nieuwland and renamed her Malabar. The EIC engaged Malabar as an "extra ship", that is, it chartered her. Before taking her up, it had Perry measure and repair her.

On 4 April 1796, Captain Robert Torin received a letter of marque for Malabar. However, apparently he did not sail her for long, if at all.

=== Voyage #1 (1796-1797) ===
On 27 June 1796, Captain William Edmeades sailed from Portsmouth, bound for Bombay. By 19 September Malabar was at the Cape, and she arrived at Bombay on - 20 January 1797. Homeward bound, she reached Tellicherry on 20 March and Cochin on 18 April. She was at the Cape again on 7 July and at St Helena on 2 August. She arrived at the Downs on 25 October.

=== Voyage #2 (1798-1800) ===
Captain Edmeades received a letter of marque on 20 April 1798. Malabar's logbook commences at Deptford on 8 February 1798. From Deptford she moved to Gravesend, and eventually sailed to the convoy rendezvous at Portsmouth. At Portsmouth the Navy took off two of her crew, who it had identified as deserters.

On 29 April Malabar sailed from Portsmouth in the company of nine other Indiamen: Fort William, Melville Castle, Lord Duncan, Airly Castle, Bridgewater, Walpole, Dublin, Contractor, and Caledonian. HMS Intrepid, which was being sent out to China, provided the convoy's escort. Malabar was bound for China, Bengal, and Madras.

The convoy reached Rio de Janeiro on 6 July. The convoy reached Lombock and Bali in late September, and arrived at Whampoa on 2 December. There Malabar discharged her cargo, which included lead.

On 8 January 1799 Malabar crossed the Second Bar, bound for Bengal. She transited via the Straits of Dryon (by Pulau Durian in the Riau Archipelago). She reached Malacca on 30 January and Penang on 9 February, before arriving at Kedgeree, an anchorage on the Hooghly River, on 1 March.

Malabar left there in late April in company with two other vessels, the American vessel Indian Chief, and the Danish vessel Norje. Malabar arrived at Madras on 12 May, and there discharged a cargo of rice.

Malabar then sailed back to Bengal with a cargo of salt, 75 "Chests of Treasure", and troops from either the 10th or 19th Regiment of Foot. She arrived at Diamond Harbour on 17 August. On 29 December she was at Calcutta, where she underwent extensive repairs in dock. She then took on a cargo of sugar and a number of passengers, including 37 military invalids, and ten French prisoners. Homeward bound, she passed Saugor on 5 December.

Malabar was at the Cape on 10 March 1800 for a short respite. She reached St Helena on 16 April, and arrived at the Down on 24 June.

== Loss ==
Captain Thomas Kent received a letter of marque on 9 December 1800. Messrs Princip & Saunders had tendered her to the EIC to bring back rice from Bengal. She was one of 28 vessels that sailed on that mission between December 1800 and February 1801. Kent sailed for Madras and Bengal on 20 January 1801.

Malabar was in Madras Roads on 3 August 1801 having come from Calcutta while homeward bound. (Note: One source gives the date as 22 May, but other contemporary sources give the date of 3 August. Lloyd's List simply reported that Malabar, Eyton, master, sailing from Madras to London, had been burnt at Madras with all her cargo. Other sources give the name of her master as Kent.) Supposedly, a cask of spirits that was being either loaded or unloaded slipped from the slings and hit the vessel aft, where the spirits caught fire from a light. The burning alcohol spread the fire and despite the efforts of her crew, the "beach department", and nearby vessels the fire reached Malabar's magazine, which exploded. She sank immediately in six fathoms — 36 feet (11 m) — of water, leaving only her mizzen-top-mast visible above water.

Fortunately, there were no deaths. Boats in the water around Malabar rescued those people who jumped overboard. However, Malabar's entire cargo, comprising some 12-13,000 bags of rice, as well as coffee and pepper, "and many articles of still greater value" was lost.

== Postscript ==
On 11 December 1807 a major hurricane hit Madras. It was so strong that it threw up on the beach the entire bottom of a ship of about 800 tons burthen. Captain Kent, who happened to be at Madras at the time, conjectured that the remains came from Malabar.
