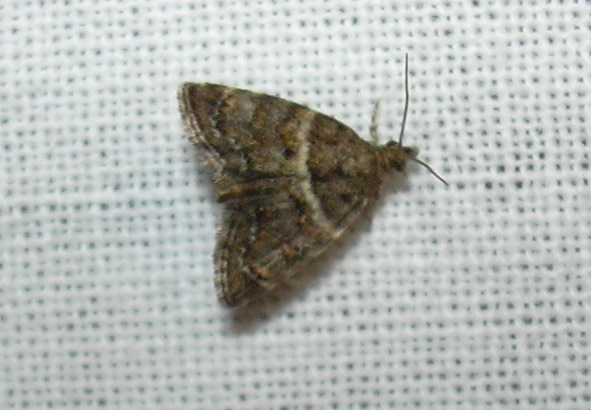

Scientific classification
- Domain: Eukaryota
- Kingdom: Animalia
- Phylum: Arthropoda
- Class: Insecta
- Order: Lepidoptera
- Family: Crambidae
- Genus: Mestolobes
- Species: M. minuscula

Binomial name
- Mestolobes minuscula (Butler, 1881)

Synonyms
- Boreophila minuscula Butler, 1881; Mestolobes simaethina Butler, 1882

= Mestolobes minuscula =

Species of moth

Mestolobes minuscula is a moth of the family Crambidae described by Arthur Gardiner Butler in 1881. It is endemic to the Hawaiian islands of Kauai, Oahu, Molokai, Maui, Lanai and Hawaii.
