= Mestolobes arctura =

Scientific classification
- Domain: Eukaryota
- Kingdom: Animalia
- Phylum: Arthropoda
- Class: Insecta
- Order: Lepidoptera
- Family: Crambidae
- Genus: Mestolobes
- Species: M. arctura

Binomial name
- Mestolobes arctura Meyrick, 1899

Species of moth

Mestolobes arctura is a moth of the family Crambidae described by Edward Meyrick in 1899. It is endemic to the Hawaiian island of Molokai.
