= Sirina =

Sirina may refer to

- Sirina Camara (born 1991), French football player
- Sirina (river), a small tributary of the Danube in Romania
- Irina Sirina (born 1967), Russian-born Hungarian handball player
- Jakub Šiřina (born 1987), Czech basketball player
- Mestolobes sirina, a moth
