= Mestolobes autodoxa =

Scientific classification
- Domain: Eukaryota
- Kingdom: Animalia
- Phylum: Arthropoda
- Class: Insecta
- Order: Lepidoptera
- Family: Crambidae
- Genus: Mestolobes
- Species: M. autodoxa

Binomial name
- Mestolobes autodoxa Meyrick, 1899

Species of moth

Mestolobes autodoxa is a moth of the family Crambidae described by Edward Meyrick in 1899. It is endemic to the Hawaiian island of Oahu.

Adults have been taken at flowers of Metrosideros species.
