= Serena =

Serena may refer to:

== Arts and entertainment ==
- Serena (genre), a 13th-century Occitan poetic genre
- Serena (1962 film), a British crime thriller
- Serena (2014 film), an American drama film starring Jennifer Lawrence and Bradley Cooper
- Serena (2026 film), an American thriller film starring Andi Matichak
- Serena: The Other Side of Greatness, a TV documentary about the tennis player Serena Williams
- Serena (novel), by Ron Rash
- Serena (video game), a horror adventure game
- Serena (Pokémon), fictional character in the Pokémon franchise

== Brands and enterprises ==
- Nissan Serena, a minivan
- Serena Hotels, which operates hotels and resorts in East and Southern Africa and South Asia
- Serena Software, an American company

== People ==
- Serena (given name)
- Serena (surname)
- Serena (actress), pornographic actress

== Places ==
- Séréna, a town in Burkina Faso
- Serena Township, LaSalle County, Illinois, United States
- Serena, Illinois, an unincorporated community and census-designated place in LaSalle County
- Serena Waterpark, in Lahnus, Espoo, Finland

== Other uses ==
- Costa Serena, a ship

== See also ==
- La Serena (disambiguation)
- Serena libre, an alcoholic cocktail
- Serina (disambiguation)
- Sirena (journal), a journal of poetry and art
