= Mestolobes pyropa =

Scientific classification
- Domain: Eukaryota
- Kingdom: Animalia
- Phylum: Arthropoda
- Class: Insecta
- Order: Lepidoptera
- Family: Crambidae
- Genus: Mestolobes
- Species: M. pyropa

Binomial name
- Mestolobes pyropa (Meyrick, 1899)

Synonyms
- Promylaea pyropa Meyrick, 1899; Promylaea pyropaee

Species of moth

Mestolobes pyropa is a moth of the family Crambidae described by Edward Meyrick in 1899. It is endemic to the Hawaiian islands of Oahu and Molokai.

The larvae feed on Peperornia species, including Peperomia pachyphylla. It is thought they mine the leaves of their host plant.

Adults have been taken at flowers of Hoya species.
