= Mestolobes chrysomolybdoides =

Scientific classification
- Domain: Eukaryota
- Kingdom: Animalia
- Phylum: Arthropoda
- Class: Insecta
- Order: Lepidoptera
- Family: Crambidae
- Genus: Mestolobes
- Species: M. chrysomolybdoides

Binomial name
- Mestolobes chrysomolybdoides Swezey, 1920

Species of moth

Mestolobes chrysomolybdoides is a moth of the family Crambidae described by Otto Herman Swezey in 1920. It is endemic to the Hawaiian island of Oahu.

Larvae have been reared from moss taken from a tree.
