= Serina =

Serina can refer to:

== Places ==
- Serina, Lombardy, a comune in the province of Bergamo, Italy

== People ==
- Serina (Battlestar Galactica), a character from the original Battlestar Galactica (1978) TV series
- Serina (actress), a Japanese actress (born 1985)

== Other ==
- Serina (grape), another name for the Austrian wine grape Blaufrankisch
- Serina (gastropod), a genus of snail in the family Enidae

== See also ==
- Serena (disambiguation)
