= Mestolobes banausa =

Scientific classification
- Domain: Eukaryota
- Kingdom: Animalia
- Phylum: Arthropoda
- Class: Insecta
- Order: Lepidoptera
- Family: Crambidae
- Genus: Mestolobes
- Species: M. banausa

Binomial name
- Mestolobes banausa Meyrick, 1899

Species of moth

Mestolobes banausa is a moth of the family Crambidae described by Edward Meyrick in 1899. It is endemic to the island of Hawaii.
