= Adventure-class ship =

Class overview
- Built: 1782–1787
- Completed: 8

General characteristics
- Tons burthen: 896 54/94 (as designed)
- Length: 140 ft (43 m) (gundeck); 115 ft 2.5 in (35 m) (keel)
- Beam: 38 ft 3 in (12 m)
- Depth of hold: 16 ft 10 in (5 m)
- Sail plan: Full-rigged ship
- Complement: 300 (294 from 1794)
- Armament: Lower deck: 20 × 18-pounder guns; Upper deck: 22 × 12-pounder guns; QD: nil; Forecastle: 2 × 6-pounder guns

The Adventure-class ship was a class of eight 44-gun sailing two-decker warships of the Royal Navy, classed as a fifth rate like a frigate, but carrying two complete decks of guns, a lower battery of 18-pounders and an upper battery of 12-pounders. This enabled the vessel to deliver a broadside of 318 pounds.

The class was designed in 1782 by Edward Hunt, Surveyor of the Navy, as a successor to the Roebuck class design of Sir Thomas Slade. The design saw a slight increase in breadth over the Roebuck class, but was otherwise very similar.

Like the Roebuck class, the Adventure class were not counted by the Admiralty as frigates; although sea officers sometimes casually described them and other small two-deckers as frigates, the Admiralty officially never referred to them as such. By 1750, the Admiralty strictly defined frigates as ships of 28 guns or more, carrying all their main battery (24, 26 or even 28 guns) on the upper deck, with no guns or openings on the lower deck (which could thus be at sea level or even lower). A frigate might carry a few smaller guns – 3-pounders or 6-pounders, later 9-pounders – on their quarterdeck and (perhaps) on the forecastle. The Adventure-class ships were two-deckers with complete batteries on both decks, and hence not frigates.

Eight ships were ordered during 1782 and completed to this design, although none were ready to take part in the American War of Independence. Most were not brought into service until the outbreak of the French Revolutionary War, and survived to serve the Royal Navy during the Napoleonic War.

== Ships in class ==
- Woolwich
  - Builder: Thomas Calhoun & John Nowlan, Bursledon
  - Ordered: 5 March 1782
  - Laid down: January 1783
  - Launched: 15 December 1785
  - Completed: 1786 at Portsmouth Dockyard
  - Fate: Wrecked off Barbuda on 11 September 1813.
- Severn
  - Builder: James Martin Hillhouse, Bristol
  - Ordered: 17 April 1782
  - Laid down: June 1783
  - Launched: 29 April 1786
  - Completed: 17 July 1793 at Plymouth Dockyard
  - Fate: Wrecked off Jersey on 21 December 1804
- Sheerness
  - Builder: Henry Adams, Bucklers Hard
  - Ordered: 26 April 1782
  - Laid down: December 1783
  - Launched: 16 July 1787
  - Completed: 20 December 1787 at Portsmouth Dockyard
  - Fate: Wrecked off Trincomalee on 8 January 1805
- Chichester
  - Builder: Crookenden, Taylor & Smith, Itchenor
  - Ordered: 13 May 1782
  - Laid down: August 1782
  - Launched: 10 March 1785
  - Completed: 28 October 1787 at Portsmouth Dockyard
  - Fate: Broken up in July 1815
- Adventure
  - Builder: Perry & Hankey, Blackwall Yard
  - Ordered: 5 June 1782
  - Laid down: October 1782
  - Launched: 19 July 1784
  - Completed: 28 October 1784 at Woolwich Dockyard
  - Fate: Broken up in September 1816
- Expedition
  - Builder: John Randall, Rotherhithe
  - Ordered: 5 June 1782
  - Laid down: October 1783
  - Launched: 29 October 1784
  - Completed: March 1786 at Deptford Dockyard
  - Fate: Broken up in February 1817
- Gorgon
  - Builder: Perry & Hankey, Blackwall Yard
  - Ordered: 19 June 1782
  - Laid down: December 1782
  - Launched: 27 January 1785
  - Completed: 15 December 1787 at Portsmouth Dockyard
  - Fate: Broken up in February 1817
- Dover
  - Builder: George Parsons, Bursledon
  - Ordered: 8 July 1782
  - Laid down: August 1783
  - Launched: May 1786
  - Completed: 1787 at Portsmouth Dockyard
  - Fate: Burnt by accident 20 August 1806
