= Mestolobes sicaria =

Scientific classification
- Domain: Eukaryota
- Kingdom: Animalia
- Phylum: Arthropoda
- Class: Insecta
- Order: Lepidoptera
- Family: Crambidae
- Genus: Mestolobes
- Species: M. sicaria

Binomial name
- Mestolobes sicaria Meyrick, 1904

Species of moth

Mestolobes sicaria is a moth of the family Crambidae described by Edward Meyrick in 1904. It is endemic to the Hawaiian island of Molokai.
