= Mestolobes quadrifasciata =

Scientific classification
- Domain: Eukaryota
- Kingdom: Animalia
- Phylum: Arthropoda
- Class: Insecta
- Order: Lepidoptera
- Family: Crambidae
- Genus: Mestolobes
- Species: M. quadrifasciata

Binomial name
- Mestolobes quadrifasciata Swezey, 1920

Species of moth

Mestolobes quadrifasciata is a moth of the family Crambidae described by Otto Herman Swezey in 1920. It is endemic to the Hawaiian island of Oahu.
