= French ship Sirène =

At least seven ships of the French Navy have borne the name Sirène:

- French frigate Sirène (1795), a Coquille-class frigate launched in 1795 and broken up in 1825
- French frigate Sirène (1823), a Vestale-class frigate launched in 1823 and stricken in 1861
- Sirène, a submarine renamed shortly after being laid down as Gustave Zédé
- French submarine Sirène (Q5), a Sirène-class submarine
- French submarine Sirène (Q123), a Sirène-class submarine launched in 1925
- Sirène, formerly HMS Spiteful (P227), a British S-class submarine in French service from 1952 to 1958
- French submarine Sirène (S651), a Daphné-class submarine completed in 1970 and struck in 1996

== See also ==
- Sirène-class submarine (disambiguation), two classes of French Navy submarines
