= Mestolobes semiochrea =

Scientific classification
- Domain: Eukaryota
- Kingdom: Animalia
- Phylum: Arthropoda
- Class: Insecta
- Order: Lepidoptera
- Family: Crambidae
- Genus: Mestolobes
- Species: M. semiochrea

Binomial name
- Mestolobes semiochrea Butler, 1882

Species of moth

Mestolobes semiochrea is a moth of the family Crambidae described by Arthur Gardiner Butler in 1882. It is endemic to the Hawaiian island of Oahu.

Adults have been taken while feeding on the blossoms of Metrosideros species.
