= All Beauty Destroyed =

Studio album by Aesthetic Perfection
- Released: November 4, 2011
- Genre: Industrial, EBM, aggrotech
- Length: 51:56
- Label: Out of Line/Metropolis

Aesthetic Perfection chronology
| A Violent Emotion (2008) | All Beauty Destroyed (2011) | 'Til Death (2014) |

Singles from All Beauty Destroyed
- 1. "The Devil's in the Details" Released: April 22, 2011; 2. "Inhuman" Released: October 21, 2011

All Beauty Destroyed is the third album released by American electro-industrial band Aesthetic Perfection. It was released on November 4, 2011 by Out of Line Records.

"The Devil's in the Details" and "Inhuman" were released as singles for the album, and music videos have been released for "Inhuman", "A Nice Place to Visit" and the title track, "All Beauty Destroyed".

On November 17, 2021, Daniel Graves announced on Aesthetic Perfection's Facebook page that the rights have been returned to him, following an agreement that elapsed a decade.

== Track listing ==
| No. | Title | Length |
|---|---|---|
| 1. | "A Nice Place to Visit" | 3:43 |
| 2. | "The Devil's in the Details" | 4:00 |
| 3. | "The 11th Hour" | 5:04 |
| 4. | "Hit the Streets" | 4:21 |
| 5. | "One And Only" | 5:09 |
| 6. | "Inhuman" | 4:18 |
| 7. | "Celebrity Sin" | 4:26 |
| 8. | "Filthy Design" | 4:42 |
| 9. | "Motherfucker" | 4:11 |
| 10. | "Under Your Skin" | 3:52 |
| 11. | "The Little Death" | 4:17 |
| 12. | "All Beauty Destroyed" | 3:54 |
| Total length: | | 51:56 |

Limited Edition Bonus Disc
| No. | Title | Length |
|---|---|---|
| 1. | "A Nice Place to Visit" (B.M.F. Remix by Extinction Front) | 3:40 |
| 2. | "A Nice Place to Visit" (X-RX Remix) | 3:31 |
| 3. | "A Nice Place to Visit" (Caustic Remix) | 3:55 |
| 4. | "Hit the Streets" (Alter Der Ruine Remix) | 5:06 |
| 5. | "The 11th Hour" (Hocico Remix) | 5:18 |
| 6. | "All Beauty Destroyed" (XP8 Remix) | 4:10 |
| Total length: | | 25:40 |
