= Mestolobes droseropa =

Scientific classification
- Domain: Eukaryota
- Kingdom: Animalia
- Phylum: Arthropoda
- Class: Insecta
- Order: Lepidoptera
- Family: Crambidae
- Genus: Mestolobes
- Species: M. droseropa

Binomial name
- Mestolobes droseropa Meyrick, 1899

Species of moth

Mestolobes droseropa is a moth of the family Crambidae, first described by Edward Meyrick in 1899 in Fauna Hawaiiensis. It is endemic to the island of Hawaii.
