= HMS Musquito (1794) =

History

France
- Name: Vénus
- Builder: West Indies
- Launched: 1793
- Captured: 1793

Great Britain
- Name: HMS Musquito
- Acquired: By capture 1793 and subsequent purchase in 1794
- Fate: Captured February 1799

General characteristics
- Type: Schooner
- Tons burthen: 71 (bm)
- Length: 55 ft 4 in (16.9 m) (overall); 46 ft 6 in (14.2 m)
- Beam: 16 ft 11 in (5.2 m)
- Depth of hold: 6 ft 4 in (1.9 m)
- Complement: 30
- Armament: Privateer: 4 x 3-pounder guns and 2 Swivel guns; 4 x 3-pounder guns

HMS Musquito (or Mosquito) was a 4-gun schooner, previously the French privateer Vénus. The Royal Navy captured her in 1793, and purchased her in 1794. Because there was already a Venus in service, the navy changed her name to Musquito. During her brief service Musquito captured an armed vessel that appears to have out-gunned her.

== Capture ==
The Royal Navy captured Venus in the West Indies in 1793.

== Career ==
Musquito was commissioned under the command of Lieutenant John Fenton. His replacement, in 1795, was Lieutenant John Boucher McFarlane.

On 9 June 1795, Mosquito captured the French privateer sloop Rasoir national, (Note: The phrases Rasoir républicain or Rasoir national were slang and gallows humour terms for the guillotine.) after a seven-hour long engagement. The privateer was armed with six guns and had a crew of 40 men. Lieutenant M'Farlane was killed early during the action. The next day Mosquito recaptured the privateer's prize, a Spanish brig that had been sailing from Havana to Cartagena with a cargo of flour. Mosquito had sustained substantial damage in the engagement and her master was unable to proceed to Mole St. Nicholas, as per orders, but instead was able to reach Providence with both the privateer and the recaptured brig.

On 24 February 1796, Intrepid was patrolling near Cap-François looking for reinforcements expected from Cork when she encountered a French corvette. After a chase of ten hours, the corvette ran ashore in a cove to the east of Porto Plata, where her crew abandoned her, enabling the British to retrieve her. She turned out to be the Perçante, armed with twenty 9-pounder guns and six brass 2-pounders, with a crew of 200 men under the command of Citoyen Jacque Clement Tourtellet. She had left La Rochelle on 6 December 1795 under orders from the Minister of Marine and Colonies not to communicate with any vessel on the way. The British took her into service as the sixth-rate HMS Jamaica. Musquito must have been in company or in sight as she shared in the proceeds of the capture. In 1796 Lieutenant Mann, (act.), commanded Musquito on the Jamaica station.

== Fate ==
In February 1799, Musquito was captured off Cuba by two Spanish Navy frigates.
