= La Serena, Colombia =

Town in Cundinamarca, Colombia

Coordinates: 4°16′23″N 74°29′34″W

La Serena is a town in Cundinamarca, Colombia.
