= The Siren (sculpture) =

Sculpture by Norman J. Gitzen

The Siren is a sculpture by Norman J. Gitzen, which was formerly displayed in Wellington, Florida. It consists of a 3-metre tall hand-pounded steel and bronze depiction of a mermaid with webbed hands and unusually large breasts. It was part of the village's public art program, which involved 21 artists loaning art work to be displayed in public places. Originally placed outside Wellington Community Centre, it caused controversy after some complaints about the nudity of the statue. The artist later added nipples to the sculpture's breasts.

The statue was featured on CNN, NPR and A Current Affair, and was included in a summary of 2005 news stories in Playboy. As of 2022, it remains in Gitzen's possession, and is displayed by him at public events and shows.
