= Siren (bronze sculpture) =

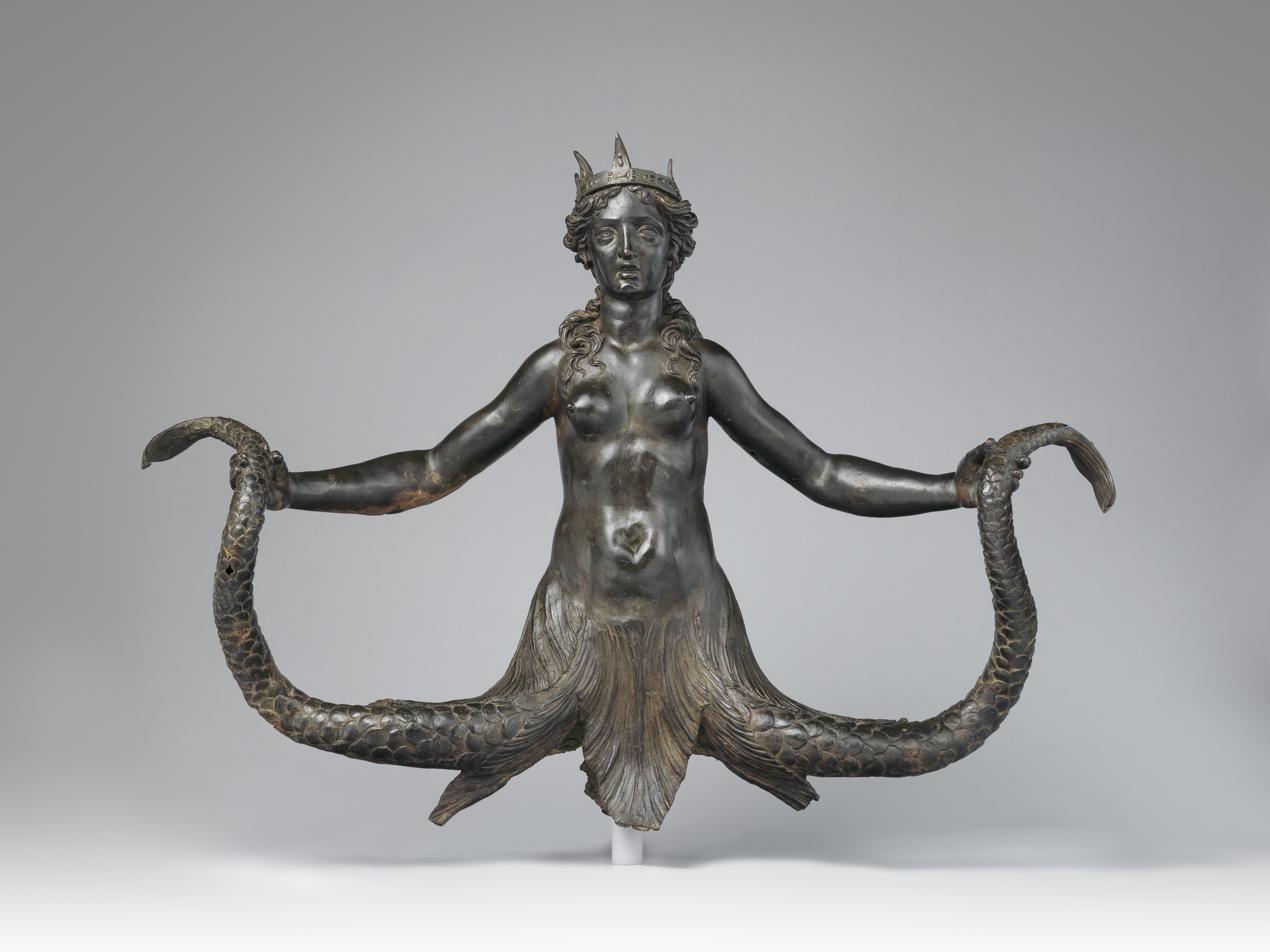
- Medium: Bronze sculpture
- Location: Metropolitan Museum of Art

This Roman bronze sculpture ca. 1571–1590 depicts a siren from Greek mythology, believed to be an emblem of the Colonna family, and first recorded in the collection of the Cardinal Francesco Maria del Monte before passing into the Barberini family. A female figure, nude from the waist up, boasts a crown and a multi-tentacled mermadic lower body. With her chin up and her arms outstretched, she grasps a scaly tentacle with each hand.
