= A Violent Emotion =

Studio album by Aesthetic Perfection
- Released: September 26, 2008
- Recorded: 2006
- Genre: Industrial, EBM, aggrotech
- Length: 46:29
- Label: Bractune Records

Aesthetic Perfection chronology
Close to Human (2005)	A Violent Emotion (2008)	All Beauty Destroyed (2011)

A Violent Emotion is the second album released by American electronic-industrial band Aesthetic Perfection. It was released on September 26, 2008 by Bractune Records. It was re-released on the label Deathwatch Asia in 2010 with a limited edition disc of remixes. A music video was released for the track "The Great Depression" on YouTube.

== Track listing ==
No.	Title	Length
1.	"The Violence"	1:19
2.	"Spit it Out"	5:42
3.	"Schadenfreude"	5:55
4.	"The Siren"	4:45
5.	"A Quiet Anthem"	5:21
6.	"Living the Wasted Life"	5:03
7.	"The Great Depression"	4:58
8.	"Pale"	6:18
9.	"Arsenic on the Rocks"	4:10
10.	"The Ones"	6:23

Japanese Bonus Disc
No.	Title	Length
1.	"Spit it Out" (Grendel Remix)	4:48
2.	"Schadenfreude" (Menschdefekt Remix)	5:27
3.	"The Great Depression" (Diabolic Art Remix)	6:59
4.	"Schadenfreude" (Animassacre Animix)	5:36
