= Syrén =

Syrén is a Swedish surname.

- Håkan Syrén (born 1952) Supreme Commander of the Swedish Armed Forces from 1 January 2004 to 25 March 2009; he was the first Supreme Commander to come from the Navy.
- Mikael Syrén (born 1965), writer and director.
