= Sarina Cross =

Sarina Cross Սարինա Սաղերեան
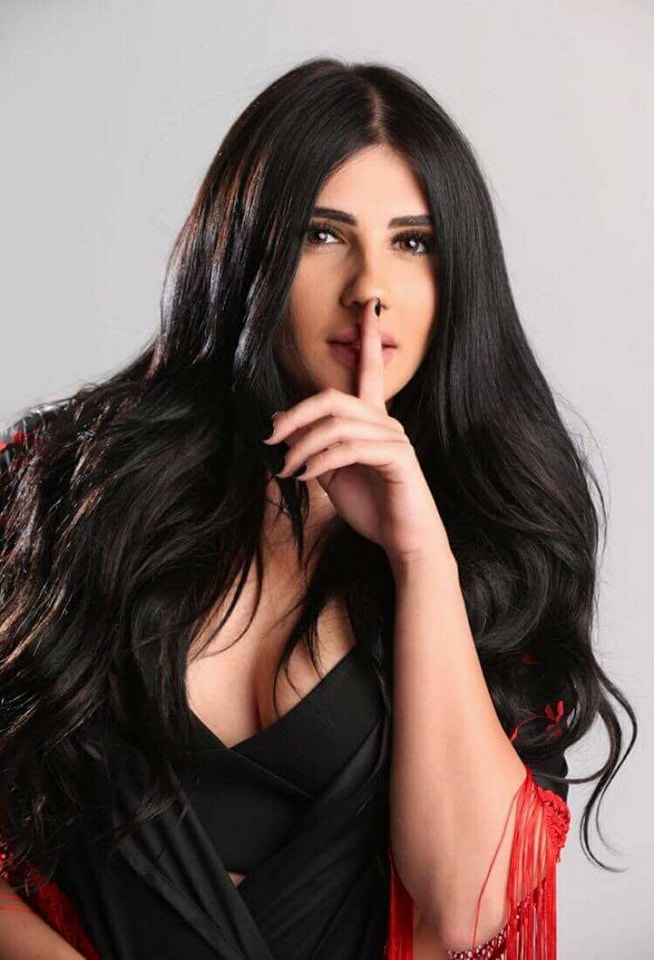

Background information
- Born: Beirut
- Occupation: Singer
- Instrument: Vocals

Sarine Sagherian, also known as Sarina Cross (Armenian: Սարինա Քրոս) is a Lebanese-Armenian singer.

In Summer of 2017, Sarina Cross was the special guest at the concert of Matthaios and Konstantinos Tsahouridis taken place in Thessaloniki city, Greece where she performed Armenian folk songs, "Bingyol", "Ashkharum sirel em qez", "Dle Yaman", "Tamam Ashkhar", the Arabic song "Qaduka al mayas" and Greek songs such as "Ι sevda s' ki metriete".
