= Serena (surname) =

Serena is the surname of the following notable people:

- Aldo Serena (born 1960), Italian footballer
- Bill Serena (1924–1996), American Major League Baseball player
- Clara Serena (1890–1972), Australian opera singer
- Fernando Serena (1941–2018), Spanish footballer
- Gustavo Serena (1881–1970), Italian actor and film director
- Michele Serena (born 1970), Italian football manager and former player
- Ottavio Serena (1837–1914), Italian politician, judge, prefect, and historian
