= HMS Siren =

Eight ships of the Royal Navy have borne the name HMS Siren, Syren or Sirene, (Note: Until the beginning of the nineteenth century (and even later) the spellings were interchangeable. Different spellings for the same ships are used in sources, sometimes within the same document.) after the Sirens of Greek mythology:

- HMS Siren (1745) was a 24-gun post ship of the 1741 Establishment launched in 1745 and sold in 1764.
- HMS Siren (1773) was a 28-gun Enterprise-class sixth rate launched in 1773 and wrecked in 1777.
- HMS Syren (1779) was a 24-gun Porcupine-class post ship launched in 1779 and wrecked in 1781.
- HMS Syren (1782) was a 32-gun Amazon-class fifth rate launched in 1782, on harbour service from 1805 and broken up in 1822.
- HMS Sirene (1794) was previously the French Serin, a brig-aviso, launched in 1788 at Bayonne. HMS Intrepid and HMS Chichester captured her in 1794. She left Jamaica in late July 1796 and was lost without a trace, probably in August 1796.
- HMS Siren was to have been a 32-gun Narcissus-class fifth rate, ordered in 1805 and cancelled in 1806.
- HMS Siren was previously USS Syren (1803). She was captured in 1814 and used as a hospital hulk. She was on the Navy list until 1815.
- HMS Siren (1841) was a 16-gun Helena-class brig-sloop, launched in 1841 and broken up by 1868.
- HMS Siren was previously HMS Opossum (1856), an Albacore-class gunboat launched in 1856. She was renamed HMS Siren in 1895, and was sold in 1896.
- HMS Syren (1901) was a Myrmidon-class destroyer launched in 1900 and sold in 1920.

== Uncommissioned vessels ==
- Syren was an American schooner that a British squadron captured off New York in January 1813 and armed for use as a tender. Disposal unknown.
- Siren was a steam tender built in 1855 for the use of royalty at Bermuda and sold in 1863.
- Syren was a training tender, purchased in 1878 and attached to HMS Britannia. She was sold in 1912.

== See also ==
- HMS Syeren, a Danish 74-gun fourth-rate captured in 1807. She was converted to harbour service in 1809, sold in 1814 but retained and sold again in 1815.
