= Sarina (disambiguation) =

Sarina may refer to Sarina, Queensland

== Sarina, Queensland ==
- Sarina Beach, Queensland
- Sarina Range, Queensland
- Shire of Sarina
- Sarina War Memorial
- Sarina railway station
- Sarina State High School

== Other ==
- Sarina (name)
- Sarina Paris (album)
- Nalani & Sarina
