= Siran, West Azerbaijan =

Siran سيران
- Village
- Location within Iran
- Coordinates: 39°22′13″N 44°18′07″E
- Country: Iran
- Province: West Azerbaijan
- County: Chaldoran
- Bakhsh: Dashtaki
- Rural District: Avajiq-e Shomali

Population (2006)
  - Total: 36
- Time zone: UTC+3:30 (IRST)
  - Summer (DST): UTC+4:30 (IRDT)

Siran (Persian: سيران, also Romanized as Sīrān) is a village in Avajiq-e Shomali Rural District, Dashtaki District, Chaldoran County, West Azerbaijan Province, Iran. At the 2006 census, its population was 36, in 9 families.
