= Cyrene =

Cyrene may refer to:

== Antiquity ==
- Cyrene (mythology), an ancient Greek mythological figure
- Cyrene, Libya, an ancient Greek colony in North Africa (modern Libya)
  - Crete and Cyrenaica, a province of the Roman Empire
  - Cyrenaica, the region around the city
  - Cyrenaics, an ancient Greek school of philosophy

== Modern-day places ==
- Cyrene, Georgia, a community in the United States
- Cyrene, Missouri, a community in the United States

== In fiction ==
- Cyrene (Xena: Warrior Princess), a fictional character in the television series Xena: Warrior Princess
- Cyrene (Creative Kingdom), a setting in the online game Entropia Universe
- Cyrene (Honkai: Star Rail), a fictional character in the turn-based Chinese video game Honkai: Star Rail

== Ships ==
- Cyrene (steamboat), a steamboat that ran on Puget Sound and Lake Washington, 1891–1912
- HMS Cyrene, a sailing frigate of the Royal Navy, sold in 1828 at Bombay
- USS Cyrene, a 1944 United States Navy motor torpedo boat tender

== Science ==
- 133 Cyrene, an asteroid
- a synonym for Nycerella, a genus of spiders
- Cyrene, a trade name for dihydrolevoglucosenone

== See also ==
- Cyren (disambiguation)
- Kyrene School District, a K-8 school district in Maricopa County, Arizona
