= Siren (surname) =

Siren or Sirén is a surname which may refer to:

- Heikki Siren (1918–2013), Finnish architect, son of J. S.
- J. S. Sirén (1889–1961), Finnish architect
- Jon Siren (born 1978), American keyboardist and drummer, co-founder of the band Mankind Is Obsolete
- Kaija Siren (1920–2001), Finnish architect, wife of Heikki
- Osvald Sirén (1879–1966), Finnish-born Swedish art historian
- Urho Sirén (1932–2002), Finnish cyclist
- Yrjö Sirola (1876–1936), Finnish socialist politician, teacher and newspaper editor, born Yrjö Sirén
