= Chrystine Tauber =

American equestrian

Chrystine Tauber is an American equestrian. She serves as the President of the United States Equestrian Federation (USEF).

== Biography ==
Tauber rode internationally in the 1960s. In 1981, she started working for the United States Equestrian Team, and managed two Olympic teams, two Pan American teams and two World Championship teams. She later served as an equestrian judge.

She has served as Executive Director of the American Horse Shows Association, Vice President of the United States Hunter/Jumper Association and Secretary of the USEF. On January 1, 2013, she became the new President of the USEF, replacing David O'Connor.

She was given the USHJA Lifetime Achievement Award in December 2016.[4]

She is married to George Tauber, and they reside in Wellington, Florida. She formerly resided in Tewksbury, New Jersey.

In 2018, Tauber was noted to have obscured sexual misconduct allegations against Jimmy Williams, a noted horseman, and to have released the information years later when pressed.
