= USS Siren =

USS Siren is a name used more than once by the United States Navy:

- USS Syren (1803) was a brig that the British Royal Navy captured in 1814; she was last listed in 1815
- USS Siren (1862) was the steamer White Rose that the Union Navy purchased in 1864 and used as a gunboat on the Mississippi River until sold in 1865; reverting to the name White Rose, she served in river commerce until abandoned in 1867.
- USS Siren (1897), a schooner commissioned on 24 June 1898. She captured the Norwegian steamer Franklin off Cuba on 2 August 1898 for blockade violation.
- USS Siren (PY-13), a patrol yacht commissioned 15 November 1940.
