= Sirena (journal) =

Sirena: Poesía, arte y crítica
- Discipline: Literature, Spanish
- Language: English, Spanish, and others
- Edited by: Jorge R. Sagastume (2004-2011), Mark C. Aldrich (2011-2012)

Publication details
- History: 2004-2012
- Publisher: Johns Hopkins University Press (United States)
- Frequency: Biannually

Standard abbreviations
- ISO 4: Sirena

Indexing
- ISSN: 1548-6400 (print); 1554-7655 (web)
- OCLC no.: 57715689

Links
- Online access

Sirena: Poesía, arte y crítica (Sirena: Poetry, Art and Criticism) was an international and multilingual academic journal founded in 2004 by Dr. Jorge R. Sagastume (Dickinson College), who edited the journal until 2011. After a feature article published in The Chronicle of Higher Education, the Johns Hopkins University Press (JHUP) approached the college to offer the distribution of the journal, and from 2004 until 2012 was published and distributed by the JHUP.

Sirena had published in over twenty languages. Every poem appeared in its original (if not English or Spanish) with facing translations into English and Spanish. The journal had published poets such as Günter Grass, Günter Kunert, Herta Müller, Pearse Hutchinson, Adrian Mitchell, Clara Janés, Homero Aridjis, and many other renowned poets. The journal also included critical essays on poetry, art, and translation studies as well as book reviews.

Sirena: Poetry, Art and Criticism appeared biannually in March and October, with an average length of an issue being 160 pages.

In 2012 the journal ceased to exist.
