= Sirène-class submarine =

Sirène-class submarine may refer to one of the following classes of submarine for the French Navy:

- Sirène-class submarine (1901) in service 1902–1919
- Sirène-class submarine (1925) in service 1927–1944
