= HMS Intrepid (1770) =

Intrepid-class ship of the line 1770–1818

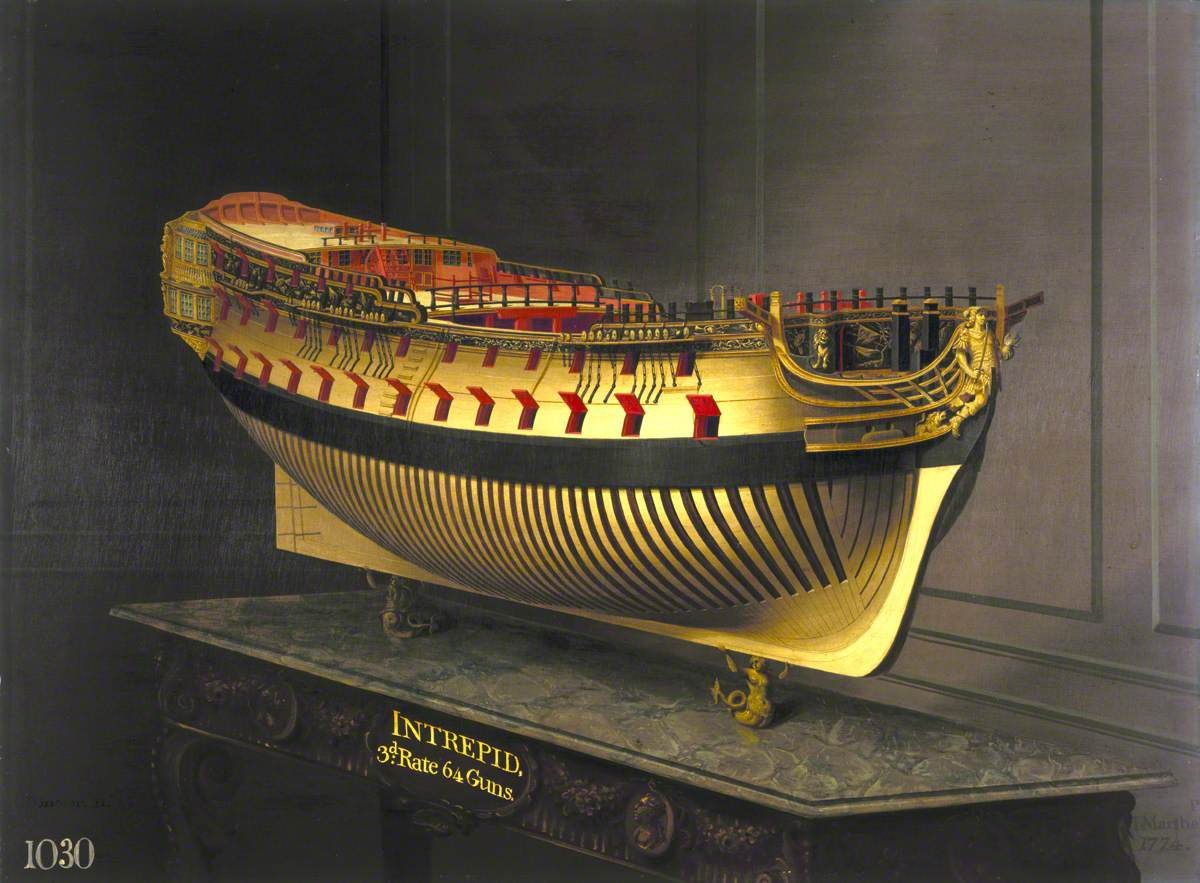
- HMS Intrepid's bow as painted in 1774 by Joseph Marshall

History

Great Britain
- Name: HMS Intrepid
- Ordered: 16 November 1765
- Builder: Woolwich Dockyard (M/Shipwright Joseph Harris to July 1767; completed by William Gray)
- Laid down: January 1767
- Launched: 4 December 1770
- Fate: Sold out of the service, 1818
- Notes: Participated in: Battle of the Chesapeake

General characteristics
- Class & type: Intrepid-class ship of the line
- Tons burthen: 137465/94 bm
- Length: 159 ft 6 in (48.6 m) (keel); 131 ft 0 in (39.9 m) (gundeck)
- Beam: 44 ft 5 in (13.5 m)
- Depth of hold: 19 ft 0 in (5.8 m)
- Propulsion: Sails
- Sail plan: Full-rigged ship
- Armament: Gundeck: 26 × 24-pounder guns; Upper gundeck: 26 × 18-pounder guns; QD: 10 × 4-pounder guns; Fc: 2 × 9-pounder guns

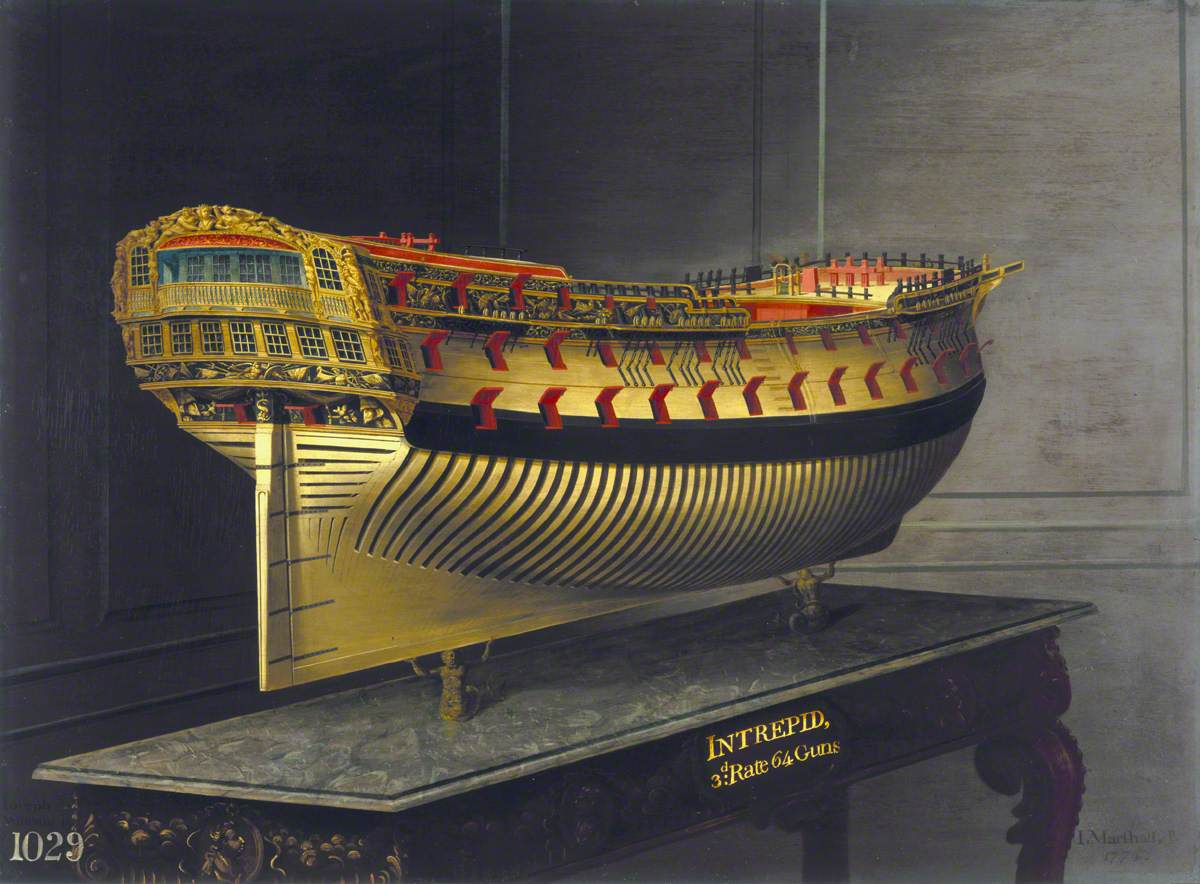
Intrepid's stern, painted in 1774 by Joseph Marshall

HMS Intrepid was a 64-gun third-rate ship of the line of the Royal Navy, launched on 4 December 1770 at Woolwich. She was sold in 1828.

== Initial service ==
In 1772 Intrepid sailed to the Dutch East Indies. The ship's master on this journey was John Hunter, later an admiral and the second Governor of New South Wales.

She took part in the Battle of the Chesapeake in 1781.

== French Revolutionary Wars ==
Intrepid and Chichester captured the advice-brig Serin off San Domingo on 31 July 1794. The Royal Navy took her into service as HMS Serin.

In February 1796, Intrepid was patrolling near Cap-François looking for reinforcements expected from Cork when she encountered a French corvette. After a chase of ten hours, the corvette ran ashore in a cove to the east of Porto Plata, where her crew abandoned her, enabling the British to retrieve her. She turned out to be Perçante, armed with twenty 9-pounder guns and six brass 2-pounders, with a crew of 200 men under the command of Citoyen Jacque Clement Tourtellet. She had left La Rochelle on 6 December 1795 under orders from the Minister of Marine and Colonies not to communicate with any vessel on the way. The British took her into service as the sixth-rate HMS Jamaica. Musquito must have been in company or in sight as she shared in the proceeds of the capture.

Captain Sir William Hargood took command of Intrepid and convoyed a fleet of nine East Indiamen to China. One was Malabar.

Hargood remained and Intrepid remained in China until the Peace of Amiens in 1802, defending Macau at the Macau Incident of January 1799.

On 4 April 1801, Intrepid captured Chance. The prize agent failed and what prize money could be recovered from his estate was not paid until 1828. (Note: A first-class share was worth £96 0s 4d; a fifth-class share, that of a seaman, was worth 5s.)

== Napoleonic Wars ==
In April 1809, a strong French squadron arrived at the Îles des Saintes, south of Guadeloupe. There they were blockaded until 14 April, when a British force under Major-General Frederick Maitland and Captain Philip Beaver in Acasta, invaded and captured the islands. Intrepid was among the naval vessels that shared in the proceeds of the capture of the islands. (Note: The prize agent for a number of the vessels involved, Henry Abbott, went bankrupt. In May 1835 there was a final payment of a dividend from his estate. A first-class share was worth 10s 2 3/4d; a sixth-class share, that of an ordinary seaman, was worth 1d. Seventh-class (landsmen) and eighth-class (boys) shares were fractions of a penny, too small to pay.)

== Fate ==
The Navy fitted Intrepid as a receiving ship in May 1810. She then went into Ordinary until 1815.

On 26 March 1828, the "Principal Officers and Commissioners of His Majesty's Navy" offered for sale at Plymouth "Intrepid, of 50 guns and 1374 tons". The Navy sold Intrepid for £3,030 on that day to D. Beatson.
