= Cyren Burdick =

American politician (1800–1837)

Member of the Michigan House of Representatives from the Kalamazoo County district
- In office November 2, 1835 – January 1, 1837

Personal details
- Born: June 25, 1800 Waitsfield, Vermont
- Died: October 26, 1837 (aged 37)

Cyren Burdick (June 25, 1800 – October 26, 1837) was an American politician who served in the Michigan House of Representatives in the first session after the adoption of the state constitution. He was one of the early settlers of the city of Kalamazoo, Michigan.

== Biography ==
Cyren Burdick was born in Waitsfield, Vermont, on June 25, 1800, the son of John Burdick and Phebe Freeman. His father was a lawyer and farmer who served multiple times as a town selectman. Burdick worked as a teacher in the winter when his duties on the farm would allow him time. In 1830, he was appointed as an assistant in the Vermont General Assembly.

In 1831, Burdick's brother General Justus Burdick went to Michigan at the suggestion of his acquaintance from school, Elon Farnsworth, who later became attorney general of Michigan. Once there, and informed about the good prospects of the village of Bronson by Lucius Lyon, a future U.S. senator, Justus Burdick purchased a portion of the village from its founder, Titus Bronson. He returned to Vermont and sent Cyrus Burdick to Michigan to act as his agent. The following year, Burdick oversaw construction of the first tavern and hotel in Bronson, the Kalamazoo House, on behalf of his brother. He moved his family into the hotel portion and operated it for two years. He also purchased a sawmill during this time, where most of the wood for the hotel was milled.

Burdick and his wife donated land in 1833 for the city's first cemetery, South West Street Cemetery, which was in use until 1862, and that same year Burdick's uncle Ira arrived and became a part owner of the Kalamazoo House. Bronson was renamed Kalamazoo on March 2, 1836.

Burdick was appointed to the first common schools committee in Arcadia Township, Michigan in 1833, and was an associate judge of the circuit court of Kalamazoo County during its first session that year. He was elected to the first session of the Michigan House of Representatives following the adoption of the state constitution in 1835, and served as a township supervisor in 1837.

In March 1834, Burdick and others incorporated the Kalamazoo Mutual Insurance Company, and Burdick served as its secretary until 1837. The company ceased operation in 1843. He formed a company along with Lucius Lyon and others in 1836 to provide transportation by boat on the Kalamazoo River, but the boat was wrecked on its second voyage, and commercial traffic on the river ceased for several more years.

Burdick died on October 26, 1837.

=== Family ===
Burdick married Mary Ann Gilman, and they had three children: Roderick Carlisle, Edgar T., and Cyren; Cyren died as a child.
