= HMS Serin (1794) =

Sloop of the Royal Navy

History

France
- Name: Serin
- Builder: Bayonne
- Laid down: 1788
- Launched: 1788
- Captured: July 1794

General characteristics
- Class & type: Hasard-class brig-aviso
- Length: Overall: 27.29 m (89.5 ft); Keel: 24.93 m (81.8 ft)
- Beam: 7.80 m (25.6 ft)
- Depth of hold: 3.74 m (12.3 ft)
- Propulsion: Sails
- Complement: 110
- Armament: 10 × 6- and 4-pounder guns

Great Britain
- Name: HMS Serin
- Acquired: 1794 by purchase of a prize
- Fate: Foundered 1796

General characteristics
- Tons burthen: 267, or 320
- Length: Overall: 92 ft 5 in (28.2 m); Keel: c. 74 ft 3 in (22.6 m)
- Beam: 26 ft 0 in (7.9 m)
- Depth of hold: 11 ft 0 in (3.4 m)
- Propulsion: Sails
- Complement: 90
- Armament: 14 × 6-pounder guns

HMS Serin (also HMS Sirene) was the French Serin, a brig-aviso, launched in 1788 at Bayonne. The Royal Navy captured her in 1794. She left Jamaica in late July 1796 and was lost without a trace, probably in August 1796.

== French Navy ==
Serin and the rest of her class were built to a design by Raymond-Antoine Haran.

On 22 April 1791 Serin was under the command of sous-lieutenant de vaisseau Dumoutier. She had brought dispatches from Cap-Français to Brest.

HMS Intrepid and Chichester captured Serin on 31 July 1794.

== Royal Navy ==
Serin was commissioned in October as HMS Serin under Lieutenant James Seward. In December Commander Daniel Guerin replaced Seward.

On 21 March 1796 Serin supported the landing of troops for an attack on Leogane. The attack was a failure. The British discovered the town was too strongly defended and withdrew the next day. A subsequent attack on Bombarde was more successful with the British capturing the fort and its garrison, but then withdrawing.

In 1796 Serin made up part of a small squadron that captured the schooner Charlotte and brig Sally.

== Fate ==
Serin sailed from Jamaica on 28 July 1796. She was never heard from again and was presumed to have foundered in August in the Bay of Honduras.
