= Nalani & Sarina =

Nalani & Sarina are an American soul-rock duo from New Jersey consisting of identical twin sisters Nalani and Sarina. They graduated high school early to pursue music full-time, performing up and down the east coast since age 16.

== Career ==
They did an interview on SiriusXM's 'Kick out the Jams' (hosted by Dave Marsh) alongside Sam Moore of Sam & Dave where they performed his song, "When Something's Wrong with My Baby" on the air, which led to an invite to perform the song with him at his New York City show at the City Winery.

Nalani & Sarina performed at a Kristen Ann Carr Fund charity event at the Sony Wonder Building where they met and sang for Bruce Springsteen. They were also interviewed by Mike McGrath for his Christmas Radio Show on NPR/WHYY.

WHYY-TV's "Friday Arts" did a segment on the sisters, which included an exclusive interview and performance in Philadelphia.

In 2017, Nalani & Sarina spoke/performed at a TEDx event held at Firefly Music Festival in Dover, DE.

LA-based publication, Music Connection named Nalani & Sarina in their Hot 100 Live Unsigned Artists and Bands in 2014, Top 25 New Music Critiques in 2015, and reviewed their live show in Hollywood, California in 2016. NJ.com featured them in "Must-hear NJ" in 2015, "35 NJ Bands You Must Hear in 2016", and "Identical Twins with a Music Mission" writeup in 2017.
