= HMS Nancy (1808) =

Brigantine of the Royal Navy

History
- Name: HMS Nancy
- Owner: Nicholas Bools and William Good (1802); Thomas Nicholas Robillards (1802—08); Admiralty (1808–13); Private owner (1813– )
- Port of registry: (United Kingdom of Great Britain and Ireland) Lyme, United Kingdom (1802); (United Kingdom of Great Britain and Ireland) Guernsey, Channel Islands (1802–08); Royal Navy (1808–13); Unknown (1813– )
- Builder: Nicholas Bools and William Good
- Launched: 1802
- Acquired: by purchase September 1808
- Fate: Sold 1813

General characteristics
- Tons burthen: 118 15/94 BOM (as built); 200, or 210 BOM (by Royal Navy
- Length: 80 ft (24 m)
- Beam: 25 ft (8 m)
- Draught: 10 ft 0 in (3.05 m)
- Propulsion: Sails
- Sail plan: Sloop (1802–06); Brigantine (1806- )
- Complement: 45
- Armament: 8 × 6-pounder guns

HMS Nancy was the two-masted mercantile brigantine Nancy that had been built as a sloop in 1802 and converted to a brigantine. Rear-Admiral Sir Sidney Smith purchased for the Royal Navy at Buenos Aires and commissioned in 1808. Nancy served on the South America station until she was sold in 1813.

== Description ==
As built, Nancy was 65 feet 0 inches (19.81 m) long, with a beam of 21 feet 8 1/2 inches (6.62 m) and a depth of 11 feet 2 inches (3.40 m). She was rigged as a sloop and was assessed at 118 15/94 tons BOM.

== Origins ==
Nancy was built in 1802 by Nicholas Bools and William Good for their own use. She was registed at Lyme on 20 July. Nancy was sold to Thomas Nicholas Robillards of Guernsey, Channel Islands. She was registered there on 31 August 1802. On 17 October 1806, she was re-rigged as a brigantine.

In 1808 Admiral Sidney Smith was the British commander-in-chief on the Brazil station after the transfer of the Portuguese Court to Brazil. He was recalled to Britain in 1809, but before his departure he purchased the British brig Nancy lying at Buenos Aires. Smith needed a small vessel to run dispatches between Buenos Aires and Rio de Janeiro. He was expecting the arrival of the schooner Mistletoe, but when she did not arrive, he found a substitute in Nancy.

== HMS Nancy ==
Smith commissioned HMS Nancy on 23 September 1808; An Admiralty Order dated 7 January 1809 ratified the purchase. Smith appointed Lieutenant John Arthur Killwick (or Kilwick), a lieutenant from Smith's flagship, Foudroyant, to command her. shortly thereafter, on 23 November, Nancy grounded in the estuary of the River Plate. She was carrying 200 Portuguese soldiers to Colonnia for the Viceroy of Brazil. The grounding required her to undergo repairs that the Portuguese paid for.

On 16 June 1809 Agamemnon, together with a squadron (which was now under the command of Rear-Admiral Michael de Courcy), put into Maldonado Bay to shelter from a storm. Then while working her way between Gorriti Island and the shore, Agamemnon struck an uncharted shoal. On 17 June her crew abandoned Agamemnon. Captain Jonas Rose, of Agamemnon, testified at his court martial that she could have been gotten off had so many knees, beams, and timbers not been decayed; furthermore, rotten planking giving way had caused the flooding that doomed her.

Nancy arrived on 4 August and stayed with the transports Kingston and Neptune as they salvaged what could be salvaged from Agamemnon. Neptune left on 22 September, but Kingston and Nancy stayed as Kingston continued salvage efforts. On 16 November a gale came up and late the next day boats sent to the wreck reported that she was strewn in pieces all over the beach. On 28 November Nancy and Kingston departed together, but soon separated with Nancy sailing for Rio de Janeiro, which she reached on 15 December.

Nancy, Mutine, Mistletoe, and the hired armed brig Pitt were anchored in the harbour of Buenos Aires on 25 May 1810 during May Week, when the revolution broke out in the city. Captain Fabian of Mutine broke out bunting and the British vessels saluted the revolution with salvos of cannon. Fabian also gave a rousing speech on liberty and revolution, praising the revolutionaries for having gained their freedom. On 28 May Pitt sailed to Rio de Janeiro with the news of the uprising. Mutine sailed for Britain with the same news on 3 June.

On 12 July 1812, Bonne Citoyenne was at anchor in Buenos Aires roads when Nancy arrived, and instead of Killwick, her Second Master and Assistant Surgeon came on board Bonne Cityonne. They reported to Captain Pitt Burnaby Greene of Bonne Citoyenne that a "mania" had overtaken Killwick and that they had had to restrain him with a straitjacket. At the time (December 1811 to September 1812), Greene was the senior officer of the Buenos Aires station and he appointed his First Lieutenant, William D'Aranda, to be acting commander in Killwick's place.

On 9 August D'Aranda sailed for Rio de Janeiro, with Killwick still restrained, and bearing a dispatch explaining the situation from Greene to Rear-Admiral Manley Dixon in Montagu. Nancy arrived at Rio de Janeiro on 26 August. The Royal Navy, always concerned about the possibility of mutiny, had a formal procedure for the removal of commanding officers for insanity. Admiral Dixon came on board Nancy, together with the chief and assistant surgeons from Montagu, and they examined Killwick. Then Dixon, the surgeons, D'Aranda, and Nancy's Assistant Surgeon all signed a Survey, a document attesting to their willingness to swear under oath that they had impartially assessed Killwick and found him unfit to command. Killwick then was taken to Montagu. The next month Dixon sent Killwick aboard a merchant vessel bound for London, together with two marines from Nancy to take care of him. (Note: At London Killwick was placed in the naval officers' ward at the mental hospital at Hoxton, a ward he shared with 15 other officers. By November 1813 he was deemed cured and received an appointment as First Lieutenant of Granicus.) Dixon then confirmed D'Aranda as Nancy's captain.

=== Isabella ===
On 8 February 1813 the British ship Isabella, of 193 tons and a crew of 14, was wrecked off the coast of Eagle Island (now known as Speedwell Island). Captain George Higton and five other men then made the hazardous voyage to the River Plate in one of the ship's longboats; they made landfall a month later. Nancy was sent to rescue the survivors.

On 5 April Captain Charles Barnard of the American sealer Nanina was sailing off Eagle Island and discovered the remainder of Isabella's crew; that evening Barnard dined with them. He informed the survivors of the outbreak of the War of 1812 and that technically survivors and rescuers were at war with each other. Still, Barnard promised to rescue the British. While Barnard was onshore gathering supplies, the British seized Nanina and departed leaving Barnard and three of his crew marooned. Shortly thereafter Nanina encountered Nancy, who took her as a prize.

Barnard and his party survived for eighteen months marooned on the islands until the British whalers Indispensable and Asp rescued him in November 1814. The British admiral in Rio de Janeiro had requested their masters to divert to the area to look for Barnard and his men.

Nanina was first condemned as a prize, but then restored to her owners. Nancy was only awarded salvage for that part of Isabella's cargo that Nanina was carrying. (Note: A first-class share of the salvage money was worth £11 16s 10d; a sixth-class share, that of an ordinary seaman, was worth 18s 4½d.)

== Fate ==
Nancy was sold in 1813, possibly back to Thomas Robillards.
