= HMS Mistletoe (1809) =

UK naval schooner launched in Bermuda (1809–1816)

History

United Kingdom
- Name: Mistletoe
- Ordered: February 1808
- Builder: Hill, Bermuda
- Laid down: 1808
- Launched: 1809
- Fate: Foundered 14 December 1816

General characteristics All measurements are design
- Class & type: Shamrock-class schooner
- Tons burthen: 15032/94, or 172 (bm)
- Length: Overall:78 ft 8 in (24.0 m); Keel:60 ft 8 1/8 in (18.5 m)
- Beam: 21 ft 7 in (6.6 m)
- Depth of hold: 7 ft 10 in (2.4 m)
- Sail plan: schooner
- Complement: Establishment:50; At loss:37, or 42
- Armament: 8 × 12-pounder carronades + 2 × 6–pounder guns
- Notes: Bermudan cedar

HMS Mistletoe was launched in Bermuda in 1809 and foundered in 1816.

== Career ==
Lieutenant Robert Ramsay was appointed to command of Mistletoe on 12 November 1808, and fitted her out.

Mistletoe was employed in protecting the British interests in the Rio de la Plata.

From 25 May 1809, Mistletoe was in company with Agamemnon, Mutine, Foudroyant, and Brilliant, escorting a convoy. On 8 June, they entered Maldonado Bay at the mouth of the Río de la Plata.

On 16 June, Agamemnon struck an uncharted shoal near Gorriti Island. She couldn't be gotten off and on 17 June, with the ship listing heavily to starboard, Agamemnon's stores and all her crew were taken off by boats from other vessels in the squadron; the following day Captain Rose and his officers left the ship. Mistletoe was one of the vessels coming to Agamemnon's assistance.

Mistletoe, Mutine, Nancy, and the hired armed brig Pitt were anchored in the harbour of Buenos Aires on 25 May 1810, during May Week, when a revolution broke out in the city.

On the deposition of the Spanish Viceroy, consequent on the revolution of 25 May 1810, Lieutenant Ramsay took charge of his Excellency's family, and, as he did of that of another ex-Viceroy, conveyed them, with several persons of distinction, at his own expense, to Montevideo.

Early in 1811, Mistletoe departed for England to beg paid off.

Between 12 April and 29 October 1811, Mistletoe was at Portsmouth, undergoing fitting. In 1812–1813 she was in the Channel under (temp) Lieutenant Joseph Williams.

== Fate ==
Mistletoe was serving as a tender to the flagship at Portsmouth and was stationed at Brighton Roads to cruise against smugglers. She was under the command of Lieutenant Wade Blake. He was ordered to cruise between Beachy Head and the Isle of Wight. On 14 December 1816, HMS Algerine sighted Mistletoe some eight miles from Dunnose in a storm of wind. She was never seen again. It was presumed that Mistletoe had foundered soon after.

In early January 2017, a wreck was discovered that was initially believed to be that of Mistletoe, but it turned out to be that of a merchantman.
