= Jonas Rose =

Royal Navy officer (1759–1820)

Captain Jonas Rose
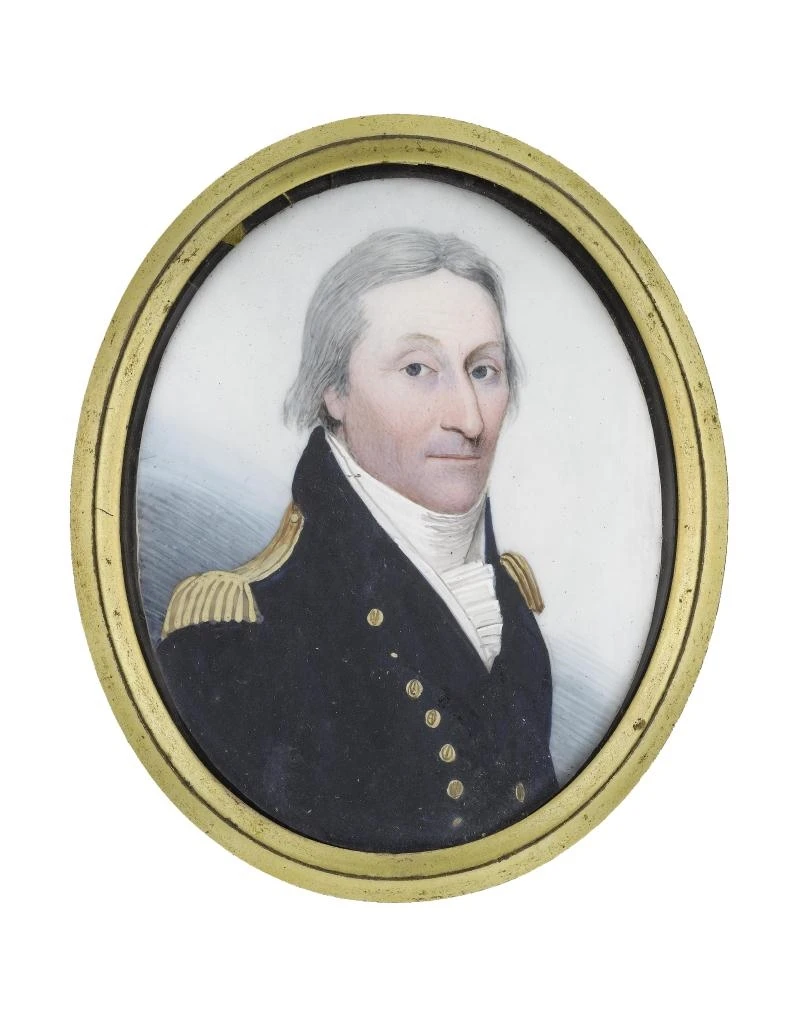
- Captain Jonas Rose
- Born: 1759; Limerick, Ireland
- Died: 1820 (aged 60–61)
- Allegiance: Great Britain; United Kingdom
- Branch: Royal Navy
- Rank: Captain
- Commands: HMS Esperance; HMS Espion; HMS Shannon; HMS Jamaica; HMS Circe; HMS Agamemnon
- Conflicts: American Revolutionary War; French Revolutionary Wars; First Battle of Copenhagen; Raids on Boulogne; Napoleonic Wars; Second Battle of Copenhagen

Captain Jonas Rose (1759–1820) was a Royal Navy officer during the American Revolutionary, French Revolutionary and Napoleonic Wars. He commanded at the Battles of Copenhagen in 1801 and 1807, and the operations in the Baltic that followed. On 16 June 1809, he wrecked his ship, HMS Agamemnon, off Maldonado, Uruguay, the second such accident of his career. He never commanded again and died in Portsmouth in 1820.

== Early life and career ==
Jonas Rose was born in Limerick in 1759. His Royal Navy career began at the age of twelve, when he joined HMS Arethusa as servant to Captain Andrew Snape Hamond on the American Station.

In 1775, he began a twenty-year period of service under George Murray which saw him rise through the ranks from captain's servant to lieutenant. In 1794, Murray was given responsibility for the North American Station and on 1 August 1795, rewarded Rose's loyalty with the 16-gun HMS Esperance, and a promotion to Commander.

== Command ==
At 05:00 on 4 May 1796, Esperance was cruising with HMS Spencer and HMS Bonetta, some 391 miles (629 kilometres) to the south-west of Bermuda, when a strange sail was seen in the west. The squadron set off in pursuit but at 08:00, Esperance signalled the arrival of a second vessel. Spencer, being nearest to the original chase, kept up the pursuit while Esperance and Bonetta peeled off.

At 09:30, it was determined that the new arrival was a schooner and that she was accompanied by a sloop. Ignoring the latter, Esperance and Bonetta went after the bigger prize, which had hoisted more sail in an attempt to escape. Esperance, which had been closest, finally caught up with the schooner at 01:00 the following morning and, after a brief exchange, forced her surrender. She proved to be the French vessel, Poisson Volant, formerly Flying Fish of the Royal Navy, prior to her capture by privateers in the Windward Passage, the year before. Spencer had caught and taken her prize, a French corvette of 16 guns, at 13:15 the previous day.

In 1797, Rose sailed Esperance to England. She arrived at Portsmouth on 3 November where she was sold. Rose and the crew were paid off. Rose was appointed commander of HMS Espion in 1799, an ex-French frigate which had been converted to a troopship in July. On 17 November she went aground on the Goodwin Sands and could not be recovered. The entire crew was rescued.

Promoted to post-captain on 1 January 1801, Rose was given command of the 32-gun frigate, HMS Shannon until March, when he was moved to HMS Jamaica.

=== Copenhagen ===
On 12 March 1801, Jamaica was sent to the Baltic with a large British fleet, under Admiral Sir Hyde Parker, to disrupt the league of armed neutrality. Delayed by bad weather, the fleet arrived at Øresund on 30 March, where it came under fire from the Helsingor batteries before anchoring off Hveen at noon.

Following an inspection of Copenhagen's defences and a council of war, Vice-admiral Horatio Nelson was awarded a squadron, of which Jamaica was part, to attack the city. During the attack, which took place on 2 April, Rose was in command of six gun-brigs, with orders to rake the Danish line at its southern end. Rose was unable to get his boats into the action because of a strong and contrary current but was nevertheless, later, mentioned in Nelson's dispatch for his exertions.

The fighting lasted for more than five hours, after which Denmark agreed to suspend its armed neutrality and open its ports to British shipping.

=== Boulogne ===
Having secured a peace agreement with Denmark, the British turned their attention to the English Channel, where an invasion from France was threatened. Nelson, who had been reappointed, crossed the Channel on 3 August, with thirty gun and bomb vessels, and the next day, attacked the assault craft, gathered at Boulogne. The offensive was less than successful and a follow-up, cutting out expedition, using boats was decided upon. This took place the same night at 23:30 but a combination of darkness, tides and current hampered the attack, which ended in defeat.

Nelson remained off Boulogne and directed further attacks on the French flotilla there, the last, a boat action, occurring on the night of 15 August. Four divisions were intended to make a co-ordinated attack but became separated in the dark and arrived piecemeal. The men from Rose's Jamaica served in the first division, under Captain Philip Somerville, which, on nearing the shore was carried away by the tide. Somerville ordered his boats to make their own way as best as they could and by first light, some had successfully attacked a French brig, moored near the pier, but were prevented from towing her out, she being secured by a chain and the men being subjected to heavy fire. Rose lost four members of Jamaica's crew in this action and a further nine were wounded.

Further along the coast, on 20 April, Rose led a small squadron in a more successful attack on six French landing craft. Rose, in Jamaica, was off Etaples when, at 20:00, gunfire was heard and a blaze seen in the south-southeast. Jamaica and the brig-sloops and gun-vessels that accompanied her, immediately set off to investigate. Two hours later, the small squadron met with the 16-gun HMS Hound. After speaking to the captain, Rose learnt that the flames came from a beached vessel, containing tar and pitch, that the crews of Hound and the 12-gun HMS Mallard had earlier set alight. When six flatboats came out of nearby Saint Valery, Hound attacked them, forcing them onto the shore where they remained, protected by soldiers and five artillery pieces.

The following morning, Rose, intent on capturing or destroying the beached boats, ordered Jamaica, Hound and Gannett to provide covering fire, while boats from each vessel, along with the gun-brigs Mallard and Tygress, attempted a landing. The landing party captured three of the craft and ensured that the rest were put out of action.

=== Hostilities renewed ===
After the short-lived peace of Amiens, Rose was employed in the Chops of the Channel. Having established a reputation at Boulogne, British newspapers began to take note of, and publish, his dispatches. In November 1804, Rose commissioned the newly built HMS Circe and captured a 4-gun Spanish privateer off Porto on 1 March 1805.

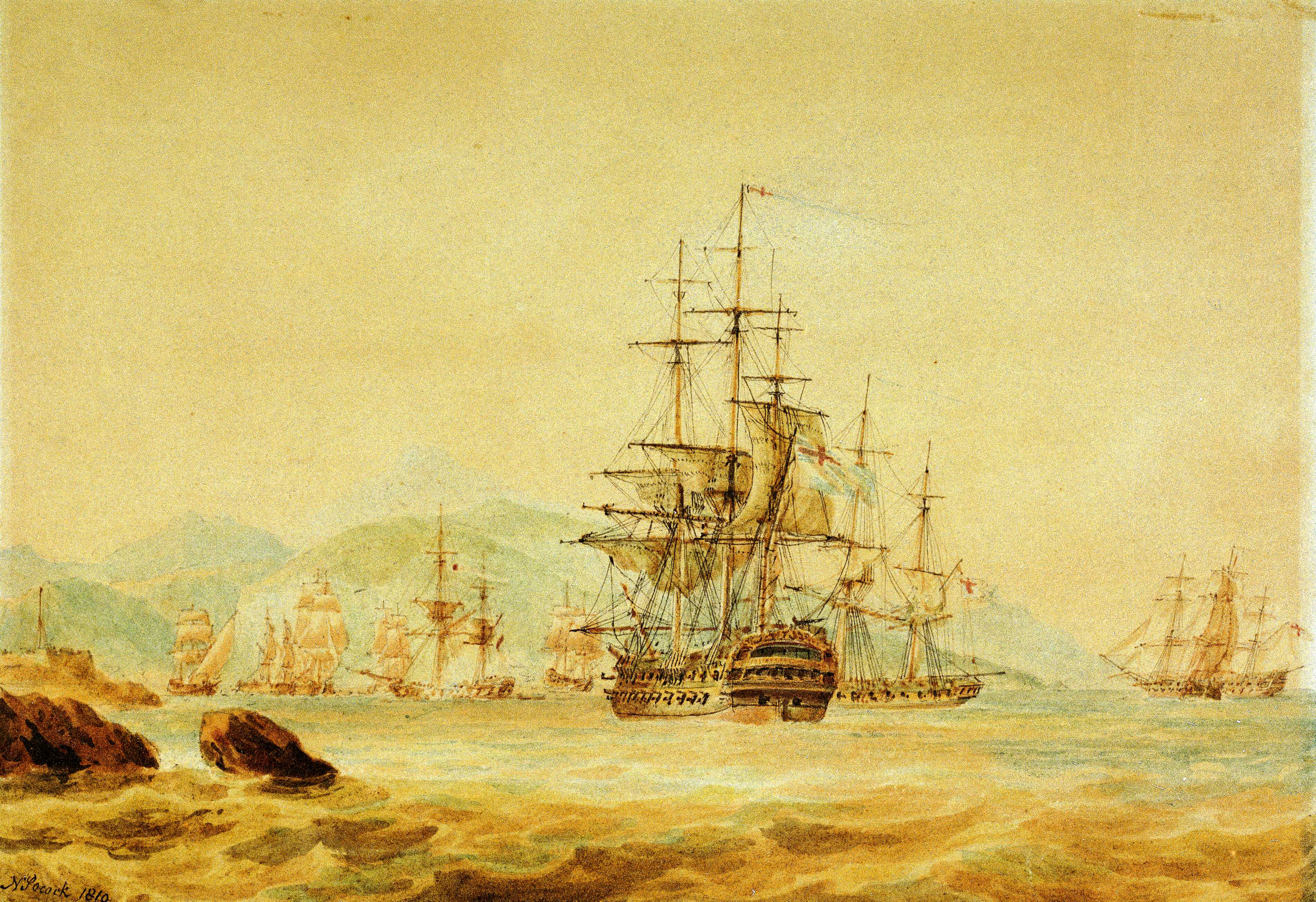
HMS Agamemnon. Rose's fourth appointment as captain

In June 1806, Rose took command of HMS Agamemnon, part of Alexander Cochrane's squadron in the West Indies. Cochrane had been keeping an eye on Martinique, where a French fleet under Rear-Admiral Jean-Baptiste Willaumez was sheltering. On 1 July, a storm blew the British ships off station and the French escaped. After capturing several vessels off Montserrat, St Kitts and Nevis, Willaumez made for Tortola, where 280 merchantmen were waiting to sail to Britain. Cochrane, knowing they were unprotected, had also been travelling to Tortola when, at daybreak on 6 July, the French were seen south-east of St Thomas. Willaumez, wishing to avoid an action, had his ships bear up for the Passage Islands. The British chased for several hours but were unable to catch up and, conscious of the vulnerable convoy, broke off and made for Tortola. In October, Agamemnon accompanied the convoy to England.

=== Copenhagen again ===
In August 1807, Rose fought at the second battle of Copenhagen. Agamemnon escorted troops from England and joined General Lord Cathcart at Stralsund, before proceeding to Oresund in July. Delayed by bad weather, some troops were landed at Wedbeck on 16 August. Further troops were put ashore at the north end of Koge Bay on 21 August. To protect these soldiers, a battery was built with guns from Rose's ship.

Britain offered the Danes a treaty of alliance and mutual defence, a promise to return their ships after the war, and various subsidies for Danish soldiers but Denmark refused to break her neutrality. Fearing a victory by the French, who were poised to invade if Denmark did not declare war on Britain, on 2 September, British forces began a bombardment of the capital. After four days, the Danes capitulated.

Rose remained in the Baltic, participating in follow-up operations, before returning to England in late 1807. In December, Rose was ordered to Portugal, where Napoleon had been threatening since early 1806 and, following an invasion by troops under General Junot, had forced the closing of her ports to British shipping. Agamemnon left Portsmouth on 6 December and sailed to the Tagus where she joined a squadron under Sir Sidney Smith, blockading the port of Lisbon.

=== South America ===
While filling up with water at Cascais Bay on 16 February 1808, Agamemnon received new orders to revictual at Gibraltar then join Sidney Smith's flagship HMS Foudroyant and HM brig Pitt at Tangier. The small squadron then set sail for Brazil, stopping on 27 February at Funchal, Madeira, for supplies. In an attempt to speed up the journey, Agamemnon took Pitt in tow while Foudroyant went on ahead. The three were reunited at Cape Verde on 9 April, when Agamemnon arrived at Praia bay, Sao Tiago island. A shortage of drinking water, triggered an increase in the consumption of grog and consequently, Rose was forced to issue floggings for drunkenness. The last leg of the journey was plagued with bad weather which caused damage to the ship and, with rainwater seeping through the decks, destroyed foodstuffs. Agamemnon had not received a thorough refit since the Battle of Trafalgar and, during the month-long stay in Rio de Janeiro, Rose received reports of a number of other faults with the ship.

In October, Agamemnon and HMS Monarch escorted an envoy, sent to expose a plot against the Portuguese king in exile. On their return, Monarch ran aground and Agamemnon was called upon to get her off.

On 16 June 1809 Agamemnon and a squadron under the command of Rear-Admiral Michael de Courcy, was sheltering from a storm in Maldonado Bay. As Agamemnon passed between Gorriti Island and the shore, she grounded on an uncharted shoal. Rose ordered the ship's boats to kedge her off, but this was unsuccessful. Agamemnon was holed below the waterline and the following day, Rose made the decision to abandon ship. Rose and his officers left on 18 June, after the crew and all the stores had been removed.

== Later years and death ==
A court martial was held in Rio de Janeiro on 22 July, where Rose claimed he could have saved the ship if it was not in such a state of disrepair. Despite being honourably acquitted, Agamemnon was Rose's last ship. He returned to England as a passenger in a transport ship and never worked again. He died on 20 July 1820 in Portsmouth.
