= Hired armed brig Pitt =

His Majesty's hired armed brig Pitt served the British Royal Navy between 1809 and 1812, primarily on the Brazil station. There are no readily available records describing the brig, or her service. She may have been the merchantman Pitt. Admiralty records in the form of logbooks for the hired armed brig do exist so original research would provide more information.

Pitt's service predates 1809. On 14 March 1808 Agamemnon, Foudroyant, and Pitt, of twelve 6-pounder guns and under the command of Lieutenant William Perkins, left Tangiers for Brazil. They reached Funchal Bay on 27 March. There they patrolled the vicinity for three days, looking for enemy vessels, and then sailed for the Cape Verde Islands. For a day or so Agamemnon towed Pitt, which was quite slow. They reached Praia, and then sailed across the Atlantic, reaching Guanabara Bay on 14 May.

Mutine, Mistletoe, Nancy, and Pitt were anchored in the harbour of Buenos Aires on 25 May 1810 during May Week, when the revolution broke out in the city. Captain Fabian of Mutine broke out bunting and the British vessels saluted the revolution with salvos of cannon. Fabian also gave a rousing speech on liberty and revolution, praising the revolutionaries for having gained their freedom. One source gives the name of Pitt's commander as Lieutenant Thomas P. Perkins, but a newspaper account for March 1811 gives it as Lieutenant W. Perkins. On 28 May Pitt sailed to Rio de Janeiro with the news of the uprising. Mutine sailed for Britain with the same news on 3 June.
