= French corvette Perçante =

French and British warship

History

France
- Name: Perçante
- Namesake: "Piercing"
- Laid down: September 1793
- Launched: June 1795
- Captured: 7 August 1798

Great Britain
- Name: HMS Jamaica
- Acquired: By capture February 1796
- Honours and awards: Naval General Service Medal with clasp "Copenhagen"
- Fate: Sold 1814

General characteristics
- Class & type: Bonne Citoyenne-class corvette
- Type: Ship-corvette in French service; Sixth-rate post ship in British service
- Tons burthen: 5148/94 bm
- Length: 119 ft 8 1/2 in (36.5 m) (overall); 100 ft 6 7/8 in (30.7 m) (keel)
- Beam: 31 ft 0 in (9.4 m)
- Depth of hold: 8 ft 5 1/2 in (2.6 m)
- Sail plan: Full-rigged ship
- Complement: French service: 200; British service: 155
- Armament: French service: 20 × 8-pounder guns + 6 × brass 2-pounder guns; British service: Upper deck: 20 × 32-pounder carronades; Fc: 2 × 9-pounder guns + 2 × 12-pounder carronades

Perçante was a 20-gun corvette of the French Navy built at Bayonne and launched in 1795. The British captured her in 1796 and took her into the Royal Navy under the name HMS Jamaica. Rated as a 26-gun sixth-rate post ship, she served during the French Revolutionary and Napoleonic Wars, during which she captured several privateers and participated in a boat attack. The British Admiralty had her laid up in 1810 and sold her in 1814.

== Design ==
Perçante was one of four Bonne Citoyenne-class corvettes launched between 1794 and 1796, all four of which the Royal Navy captured between 1796 and 1798. The class was built to a design by Raymond-Antoine Haran. All members of the class were flush-decked, but with a long topgallant forecastle.

== French service ==
Perçante was stationed at Bayonne and Rochefort. Initially she was under the command of enseigne de vaisseau Laporte, who commanded her from 13 June 1795 to 17 August.

His replacement was lieutenant de vaisseau (later capitaine de frégate) Tourtelot. He commanded her at least during the period 20 October to 23 November.

Her first major voyage was to Guyane, where she first delivered member of the National Convention Bertrand Barère into exile, and then delivered dispatches and supplies to the Antilles. Her second voyage had her carrying arms and munitions from the Île-d'Aix roads with destinations Cayenne and then Basse-Terre. For this voyage she was under the command of lieutenant de vaisseau (later capitaine de frégate) Tourtelot (the elder).

== Capture ==
On 6 December 1795, Perçante departed La Rochelle, under orders from the Minister of Marine and Colonies not to communicate with any vessel on the way.

In late February 1796, (Note: Troude says 28 April 1796, but the London Gazette had already published on 26 April a letter dated 29 February describing the capture.) Perçante was sailing from Cayenne to Cap Français when, near Samana Bay, around 21:00, she encountered the 64-gun third rate HMS Intrepid, patrolling and looking for reinforcements expected from Cork. Intrepid gave chase, and the two ships exchanged fire from 23:00 until 04:00 the next morning, when the wind strengthened, giving an advantage to Perçante.

However, Perçante soon sighted two British corvettes to the north and a frigate in the south; Tourtelot then ordered Perçante beached in a cove to the east of Porto Plata. Intrepid anchored and started bombarding Perçante, forcing her crew to abandon her after destroying her pumps and opening her sea valves in an attempt to scuttle her.

The British nevertheless managed to retrieve Perçante, and commissioned her in the Royal Navy as the sixth-rate HMS Jamaica. Tourtellot was honourably acquitted of the loss of his ship.

== British service ==
Commander Samuel Brooking commissioned Jamaica in April 1796, on the Jamaica station, where he and she would remain for some three years. (Brooking received his promotion to post captain, the appropriate rank for the captain of a post ship, in July 1796.)

On 27 November 1796 Jamaica captured Adélaïde and on 10 June 1797 Dix Après.

During the period 29 October 1797 and 12 March 1798 Jamaica destroyed a French 10-gun privateer schooner, name unknown. On 7 February 1798 she captured the French privateer schooner Fortunée. The schooner was armed with one or more 4-pounder guns.

Towards the end of the next year, on 27 November 1798, Jamaica captured Rebecca, and then on 9 December she captured the Fox.

Early in 1799, that is on 7 January, 27 January, and 24 February, Jamaica captured the vessels Shark, Friends, and Gravenhorst. Also, between 12 February and 30 March, Jamaica captured two merchant vessels. Later that year Jamaica sailed to Britain.

later, on 25 July, Jamaica, Europa and Andromache passed Plymouth as they sailed up the Channel escorting the East India, Jamaica, Lisbon, and Oporto fleets. On 22 August Jamaica arrived at Deptford; she was paid off there in August. (Note: On 12 May 1800, Mr. Robert Sewell, Esq., agent of the island of Jamaica, presented Brooking with a sword worth 100 guineas. The sword was a gift by the House of Assembly under a resolution of 14 November 1799, for Brooking's conduct in protecting the island and its trade for some three years.) She remained at Deptford for repairs until October, with Captain John Mackeller recommissioning her in September.

Mackeller escorted a fleet of merchantmen to and from the Baltic and recaptured an English mast-ship and a brig laden with corn. He also forced a privateer, under the command of Captain Blankeman, to throw 14 guns and other gear overboard during an unsuccessful, for Jamaica, chase. (Note: Blankeman was a notorious privateer whose name is variously reported as "Blanckman", "Blankman", "Blanchman", "Blankeman", "Blackeman", among others. The year before, Champion had captured him and his then vessel, which the Royal Navy took into service as Anacreon.) The two English vessels recaptured may have been the Duke of Athol and James and Ruth on 13 and 14 December 1800. In March 1801 Mackeller transferred to Terpsichore, sailing her to the East Indies in June. (Note: Mackellar was court-martialled on 20–26 May 1802 and dismissed the service for violating the Second (drunkenness and scandalous conduct) and Thirty-third (failure to follow orders while on shore) Articles of War. However, he returned to the Navy later, eventually retiring as an admiral. Subsequent biographies and obituaries overlook the court-martial and period of dismissal.)

In 1801 Captain James Brisbane replaced Mackeller, only to have Captain Jonas Rose replaced Brisbane, still in March. Rose then sailed Jamaica to the Baltic, where she participated in the Battle of Copenhagen. Jamaica and the various British brigs and gunvessels were tasked with raking the southern end of the Danish line. Towards the end of the battle, Jamaica was nearby when the Danish ship of the line Dannebrog exploded. In 1847 the Admiralty awarded the Naval General Service medal with clasp "Copenhagen" to all the surviving British claimants from the battle.

Jamaica returned to the Channel and on 20 and 21 August her boats and several vessels were involved in action in the neighbourhood of Étaples. On the evening of 20 August Jamaica was off Etaples when she heard cannon fire and lookouts saw a large fire. Rose sailed to investigate, encountering Hound, which informed him that the fire came from a cargo of pitch and tar on a vessel wrecked on the coast some time previously that boats from Hound and Mallard had set on fire. Six flat boats had come out of Saint Valery but Hound had forced them onshore, where they still lay. The following morning Rose sent in boats from Jamaica, the brig sloops Hound and Gannet, and the gunbrigs Mallard and Tygress. As the boats went in the ships themselves provide covering fire. The boats brought out two launches and a flat boat 45' long and 24' wide, armed with an 8" howitzer. However, the latter later sank; the other three on shore had already been so damaged that they were irretrievable, but the landing party still did as much further damage as time permitted. Jamaica lost one man killed, and each of the other four British vessels had a man wounded in the effort.

In 1803–1804, Jamaica captured or recaptured a number of vessels.

- Jeune Carolie (or Jeune Corallie), 2 June;
- Dutch ship Jeune Marie, 2 June, in company with the privateer Lord Nelson;
- Marie and Madaline, French fishing vessels, 7 June;
- Sirene, 19 June;
- Brigs Eagle and Leander, recaptured 5 January 1804;

During this period, on 13 August 1803, Jamaica was seven leagues off the Isle de Bas, when she captured the French privateer Fanny. Fanny was a cutter of two guns and 20 men. She had only been out 12 hours before Jamaica captured her and had made no captures herself.

Captain John Dick replaced Rose on 24 November 1804. Under his command Jamaica served on the Channel and Newfoundland stations. He sailed Jamaica for Newfoundland on 19 January 1806. On 10 April, perhaps on the way, Jamaica and Paulina detained Algema Belong.

On 7 November, Jamaica recaptured the brig Margaret, B. Vickers, master.

In 1807 Captain Arthur Lysaght, who had been promoted to post captain on 25 September 1806, commanded Jamaica on the Jersey station.

On 6 May 1807 the boats of Inconstant, the flagship of Vice-Admiral James Saumarez, captured the French ship Julia. Jamaica and Albaore shared in the proceeds of the capture.

Jamaica appears to have had her share of disciplinary problems. On 29 October 1807, a court martial was convened aboard Gladiator. First, Surgeon W.W. Hutchinson was tried for making provoking speeches and gestures towards Lieutenant J. Mascall of the Royal Marines. Hutchinson called the purser as a witness, but Mascall objected, arguing that the purser was an atheist. Lieutenant Philip Helpman gave evidence concerning the purser's character that led to the purser being dismissed the service. Then the court martial tried the master, Mr. Hartree for drunkenness and contempt towards Lysaght. Mascall was tried also for drunkenness and abusive behavior towards Hutchinson. Helpman was tried for striking a marine sergeant and sentinel while on duty. Lastly, Hutchinson was tried for using gross and abusive language to Hartree. The court martial board sentenced Hartree to a severe reprimand and admonished him to be more careful in the future, Hutchinson to a reprimand, and Helpman to be dismissed the service.

Later, Lysaght sailed Jamaica to Newfoundland three times, on 12 June 1808, in 1809, and on 27 May 1810. Between the second and third voyages, Jamaica was in company with Blossom when they recaptured the American brig Iris. On 11 August Jamaica captured the American schooner Virginia.

== Fate ==
Jamaica was laid up in ordinary at Portsmouth in November 1810. The Principal Officers and Commissioners of His Majesty's Navy offered "Jamaica, of 26 guns and 522 tons", lying at Portsmouth, for sale on 11 August 1814. The buyer had to post a bond of £3,000, with two guarantors, that they would break up the vessel within a year of purchase. She sold on that day for £1,300.

== See also ==
- List of ships captured in the 19th century
