= HMS Bonetta (1803) =

Sloop of the Royal Navy

History

Great Britain
- Name: Adamant
- Builder: Britlingsea, or Colchester, or Bridlington
- Launched: 1798
- Fate: Sold 1803

United Kingdom
- Name: HMS Bonetta
- Acquired: 1803 by purchase
- Fate: Sold 1810

United Kingdom
- Name: Adamant
- Acquired: 1814 by purchase
- Fate: No longer mentioned after 1818

General characteristics
- Tons burthen: 208, or 209 (bm)
- Length: Overall:86 ft 3 in (26.3 m); Keel:66 ft 6 in (20.3 m)
- Beam: 24 ft 3 in (7.4 m)
- Depth of hold: 10 ft 10 in (3.3 m)
- Sail plan: Sloop
- Complement: Letter of Marque; 1798:20; 1803:20; Royal Navy:80
- Armament: Letter of Marque; 1798:10 × 12&9-pounder guns; 1803: 12 × 6&9-pounder guns; Royal Navy:14 × 24-pounder carronades

HMS Bonetta was launched in 1798 as the merchantman Adamant. The Royal Navy purchased her in 1803. She had a relatively unremarkable career escorting convoys in the North Sea and Channel before she was laid up in 1807 and sold in 1810. Her new owners in 1810 returned her name to Adamant. In 1816 she carried the first free settlers to Hobart in Van Diemen's Land. From there she sailed to engage in whaling. She was last reported at Timor in 1818.

== Merchantman ==
Adamant first appeared in Lloyd's Register (LR) in 1798 with W.Ranton, master, M. Warren, owner, and trade London–Lisbon. On 23 May 1798 William Banton, Jr. acquired a letter of marque.

The Register of Shipping (RS) for 1803 showed her master as Spalding, her owner as M. Warren, and her trade as London–Cadiz. On 23 March 1803 Adamant, Spalton, master, arrived at Gravesend from Cadiz. Then on 8 June William Spatten? acquired a letter of marque.

== Naval sloop ==
The Admiralty purchased Adamant in August 1803 and renamed her Bonetta. Between September and December she underwent fitting at Woolwich.

Commander Roger Savage commissioned her in October. In April 1804 she was under the command of Lieutenant John Meik (acting). In 1805 she was under the command of Commander Henry Probyn and later Commander Charles Bateman in the North Sea. In July 1806 she was under the command of Commander John Phillips.

Although by one report Bonetta was laid up at Sheerness in July 1807, she shared in the prize money for three prizes taken in August and September. Bonetta and Mutine were among the British vessels sharing in the prize money arising from the capture of the Hans and Jacob (17 August), Odifiord (4 September) and Benedicta (12 September). (Note: An able seaman's share of the prize money for Hans and Jacob was 2s 6d; for Odifiord and Benedicta it was 1s 3½d.) On 22 August she was in company with Zebra and Paulina when they captured the Danish vessel Sally. Bonetta was one of six British warships that shared in the capture on 23 August of the Danish vessel Speculation.

Disposal: The "Principal Officers and Commissioners of His Majesty's Navy" offered Bonetta for sale on 20 September 1810 at Chatham. She sold on that day.

== Merchantman ==
Bonetta's purchasers returned her name to Adamant. She reappeared in LR for 1811 with H. Nelson, master, Cockshut, owner, and trade London transport.

The RS for 1816 showed Adamant with P. Laughton, master, changing to W. Elder, Coxshot, owner, and trade London–Petersburg, changing to London–South Seas. She had undergone small repairs in 1815.

On 9 May 1816 Captain W. Elder (or Alder), sailed from Deal, bound for a whaling voyage to the South Seas. Adamant arrived at Hobart, Van Diemen's Land, on 20 September with merchandise and passengers. She carried as free settlers James, William, and Thomas Salmon, who had chartered her and loaded her with a cargo of merchandise. Adamant was the first migrant, or non-convict ship, to Van Diemen's Land. On 2 November she sailed for the whale fishery.

She was reported to be at Timor on 7 January 1818 with 500 barrels of whale oil.

== Fate ==
There is no report of Adamant after 7 January 1818 in Lloyd's List's ship arrivals and departures data. The registers continued to carry her at least until 1820, but with stale information.
