= Pitt (1802 ship) =

Ship

History

United Kingdom
- Builder: America
- Launched: 1800
- Acquired: 1802
- Fate: Last listed 1818

General characteristics
- Tons burthen: 174, or 176 (bm)
- Sail plan: Snow
- Complement: 12
- Armament: 1805:8 × 9&6-pounder guns; 1812:6 × 6-pounder guns

Pitt was launched in 1800 in "America", probably under a different name, or possibly as Pitt, but in New Providence. She first appeared in British records in 1802. She then traded as a West Indiaman between 1808 and 1811 she may have served the British Royal Navy in South America as a hired armed brig. From 1812 she traded with the Iberian Peninsula and possibly the Baltic. She was last listed in 1818.

== Career ==
Pitt first appeared in Lloyd's Register (LR) in 1802.

| Year | Master | Owner | Trade | Source |
|---|---|---|---|---|
| 1802 | Moultrie | Hudson&Co. | London–New Providence | LR |
| 1803 | Moultrie | Hudson&Co. | London–New Providence; London–Antigua | |
| 1805 | Moultrie; Newcombe | Hudson & Co. | London–Antigua | LR |

On 1 January 1805 Lloyd's List (LL) reported that Pitt, Newcombe. master, had been run foul of and had had to put back into Blackwall with considerable damage.

Captain Samuel Newcombe acquired a letter of marque on 23 January 1805. Then in early February Pitt again suffered a mishap. The East Indiaman Wexford ran foul of Pitt, damaging Pitt and forcing her to put back into Portsmouth for repairs.

| Year | Master | Owner | Trade | Source |
|---|---|---|---|---|
| 1807 | Newcombe; S.Barber | Hudson & Co. | London–New Providence; London–Monte Video | LR |
| 1808 | S.Barber | Cooks&Co. | London–Monte Video | LR |

This entry continued unchanged until the 1812 issue of LR. During this time Pitt may have served as the hired armed brig Pitt for the British Royal Navy on the South America station.

| Year | Master | Owner | Trade | Source |
|---|---|---|---|---|
| 1812 | S.Barber; Anderson | Cooks&Co. | London–Spain | LR |
| 1815 | Anderson | Cooks&Co. | London–Memel | LR |
| 1818 | Anderson | French | London–Viana | Register of Shipping |

== Fate ==
Pitt was last listed in LR in 1815 and in the Register of Shipping in 1818.
