= Action of 31 May 1796 =

- Part of the French Revolutionary Wars
Date	31 May 1796
Location	Off Arma di Taggia and Bussana
Result	British victory

Belligerents
Great Britain	(France) French Republic

Commanders and leaders
Commodore Horatio Nelson	Enseigne de vaisseau Pioch

Strength
Ship of the Line HMS Agamemnon	2 gunboats 5 transports

Casualties and losses
1 killed & 3 wounded	7 ships captured

The action of 31 May 1796 was a small action during the French Revolutionary Wars in which a Royal Navy squadron under the command of Commodore Horatio Nelson, in the 64-gun third-rate ship of the line HMS Agamemnon, captured a seven-vessel French convoy that was sailing along the coast from Menton to Vado in the Mediterranean. The British succeeded in capturing the entire convoy, with minimal casualties to themselves.

Nelson had received the news that the French were trying to take supplies to St Pierre d'Acena for the siege of Mantua. He therefore set out to intercept any such attempt.

When Nelson and his squadron sighted a small convoy of seven sail skirting the coast, he pursued them. The French vessels anchored under the guns of a shore battery and hoisted French flags. Nelson then sent in the squadron's ships' boats to capture the convoy. After a short resistance by an armed tartane of three guns, a gunboat of one gun, and the battery, the British succeeded in taking the vessels. British casualties were one man killed and three wounded. French records place the action off Arma di Taggia and Bussana.

The vessels the British captured were two naval vessels and five transports.

- Génie, which the British described as a ketch, was armed with three 18-pounder guns and four swivel guns. She had a crew of 60 men, under the command of enseigne de vaisseau Pioch. She was one of 28 merchant tartanes that the French Navy acquired between March and June 1794 at Sète and Agde. Génie, however, was apparently purchased, at Agde, and commissioned in June 1796. The French Navy armed the tartanes with large guns to serve as gunboats. (Note: Unfortunately, the information in Winfield and Roberts, and Winfield, has a mistaken fate for Génie. She did not become HMS Venom. Vessel types, dates, and locations do not match in that Venom was a brig already in service in the Caribbean in March–April 1794. She continued to serve there until 1799 or 1800. It is quite possible that Génie became a Venom, it was not uncommon for local station commanders to commission locally-acquired vessels, particularly as tenders to a larger vessel, but the Venom the sources refer to is a different vessel entirely.)
- Numéro Douze (Chaloupe-cannonière №12), was a gunboat of one 18-pounder gun, four swivel guns, and 30 men. Some records report that she was commissioned in 1795 and was under the command of Captain Ganivet at the time of her capture. (Note: Numero Douze matches the admittedly sketchy information for one of a series of chaloupe-canonnières built at Toulon in 1794. However, No. 12 was renamed Négligente in May 1795, and was reportedly wrecked near Genoa that month. There is evidence that there was a second Numéro Douze that also was lost near Genoa. It is possible that after the loss of Numéro Douze/Négligente in May 1795, the French Navy commissioned a new Numéro Douze that then was the one captured in 1796.)
- Brig Bonne-Mère, of 250 tons (bm), carrying as cargo brass 24-pounder guns, 13" mortars, and gun carriages;
- Ketch Vierge de Consolation, of 120 tons (bm), carrying a cargo of brass guns, mortars, shells, and gun carriages;
- Ketch Jean Baptiste, of 100 tons (bm), carrying brandy and a small amount of bread;
- A ketch of unknown name of 100 tons (bm), carrying Austrian prisoners; and
- Ketch St. Anne de Paix, of 70 tons (bm), carrying wheelbarrows and entrenching tools. The British destroyed her.
