= HMS Mutine (1806) =

Brig-sloop of the Royal Navy

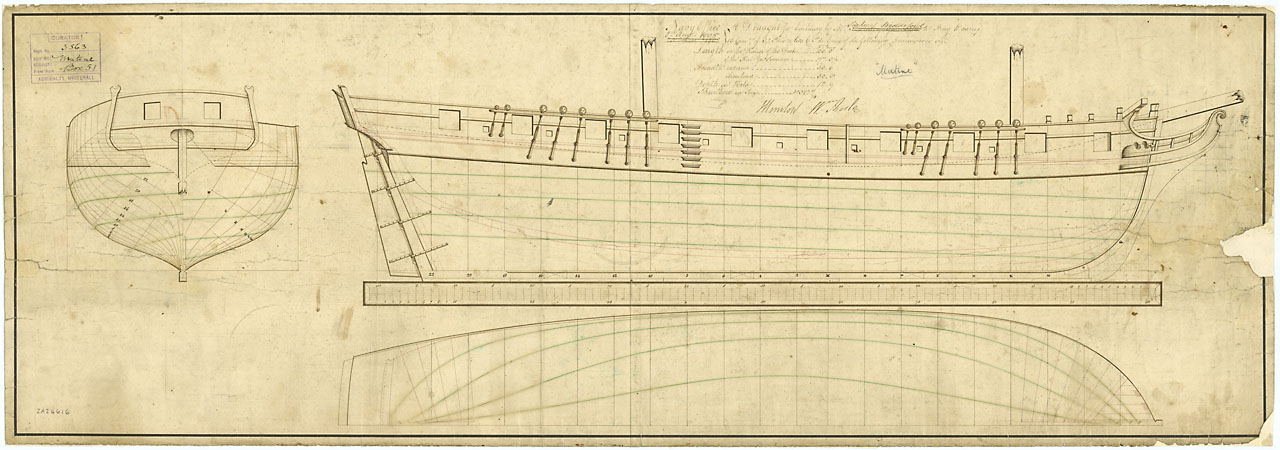
- Mutine

History

United Kingdom
- Name: HMS Mutine
- Builder: Chapman, Bideford
- Launched: 15 August 1806
- Honours and awards: Naval General Service Medal with clasp "Algiers"
- Fate: Sold on 3 February 1819

General characteristics
- Class & type: 18-gun Cruizer-class brig-sloop
- Tons burthen: 386 bm
- Length: 100 ft 0 in (30.5 m) (overall); 77 ft 3 1/4 in (23.6 m)
- Beam: 30 ft 8 in (9.3 m)
- Depth of hold: 12 ft 10 1/2 in (3.9 m)
- Propulsion: Sails
- Armament: 16 × 32-pounder carronades; 2 × 6-pounder guns

HMS Mutine was a Royal Navy 18-gun Cruizer-class brig-sloop, built by Henry Tucker at Bideford and launched in 1806. During her career she was in combat in Danish waters, in the Bay of Biscay, and at Algiers. She also visited North America, South America, and the West Coast of Africa. She was sold in 1819.

== Career ==
=== Danish waters ===
In August 1806 Commander Hew (or Hugh) Stewart (or Steuart) commissioned Mutine, which underwent fitting out at Plymouth for the North Sea and the Baltic Sea until February 1807. She then participated in Britain's attack on Copenhagen and the subsequent Gunboat War with Denmark.

Mutine's first duties involved escorting the King's German Legion to and from the island of Rügen. In preparation for the attack on Copenhagen. In August 1807, she covered the landings of British troops at Køge, south of Copenhagen, where they set up a battery north of Køge in preparation for laying siege to the Danish capital.

The Danish deployed gun-vessels in an attempted to disrupt the operations. The British countered with a flotilla consisting of Mutine, Hebe and Cruizer, and four bomb vessels, Thunder, Vesuvius, Aetna and Zebra. Captain Peter Puget of Goliath took command of the flotilla and deployed to protect the troops.

On 22 August a Danish flotilla of three praams, each carrying 20 guns, and over 30 gunboats, attacked the inshore squadron off the entrance to Copenhagen's harbour. Several floating batteries and block-ships added their support to the Danish flotilla by also firing on the British vessels. The battle lasted for four hours, but resulted in little damage and few casualties, thought the Danes did drive back the British.

Mutine and Bonetta were among the British vessels sharing in the prize money arising from the capture of the Hans and Jacob (17 August), Odifiord (4 September) and Benedicta (12 September). (Note: An able seaman's share of the prize money for Hans and Jacob was 2s 6d; for Odifiord and Benedicta it was 1s 3½d.)

On 2 October, the Juliana, out of Liverpool had encountered and driven off a French privateer 200 miles west of Scilly. The next day, Juliana spotted a brig, and after closing on her under a French flag, raised the English flag and boarded her. Suspicious because her captain was carrying several different sets of papers, Captain Bibby of the Juliana planned to take her into Liverpool. Mutine arrived on the scene in the evening, and after ascertaining the situation, Captain Stewart took over the prize vessel, by now identified as the Joannah, and put his own crew aboard her.

=== South America ===
By May 1808 command of the Mutine had passed to Commander Charles Montague Fabian. He sailed to Sierra Leone via Madeira and Gorée, to deliver the new governor of the colony, Thomas Perronet Thompson. Mutine then returned to Britain. Fabian sailed for Brazil on 8 November.

Mutine was part of the squadron under Rear Admiral Michael de Courcy when Agamemnon wrecked near the island of Gorita in the Rio de Plata on 20 June 1809. Her carpenter joined those of Agamemnon, Bedford, Elizabeth and Foudroyant in signing a document attesting that although Agamemnon might be righted, pumped out and somewhat repaired, she was effectively a total loss. Mutine remained on station, helping with the salvage operations, particularly of the cannons, 38 of which were rescued and landed at Gorita.

Mutine was anchored in the harbour of Buenos Aires on 25 May 1810 during May Week when the revolution broke out in the city. Captain Fabian broke out bunting and saluted the revolution with salvos of cannon. He also gave a rousing speech on liberty and revolution, praising the revolutionaries for having gained their freedom. Mutine escorted Archduke Charles, which had come from Lima with a valuable cargo, to England. On her return in early July, Mutine reported to Lord Wellesley on the revolution in Argentina.

=== Battle with the French ===
On 22 October 1810, Commander Frederick William Burgoyne briefly took command before passing it on 31 October to Commander Nevison de Courcy. In 1812 de Courcy sailed Mutine to Quebec, and then home.

When news of the outbreak of the War of 1812 reached Britain, the Royal Navy seized all American vessels then in British ports. Mutine was among the Royal Navy vessels then lying at Spithead or Portsmouth and so entitled to share in the grant for the American ships Belleville, Janus, Aeos, Ganges and Leonidas seized there on 31 July 1812. (Note: A first-class share was worth £20 19s; a sixth-class share, that of an ordinary seaman, was worth 4s 1d; the Commander in Chief received £230 10s 8d.)

In 1813, Mutine was operating in the Western Approaches. Whilst Mutine was cruising in the Bay of Biscay De Courcy spotted a strange sail on the morning of 17 April. Mutine gave chase and at about 2pm her quarry hoisted the French flag. She then opened fire on Mutine with her stern chasers. The fire damaged Mutine's rigging, slowing her and causing her to begin to fall behind. Still, Mutine managed to stay close enough to fire back for the next two hours. Eventually, shots from Mutine took away her quarry's main-top-gallant-mast and jibs, slowing her and allowing Mutine to catch up. Then, after a further 50 minutes of battering, the French vessel struck. She turned out to be the privateer Invincible, Martin Jortis, master. Her armament consisted of twelve French 18-pounder carronades and four 6-pounder guns, though she was pierced for four more cannon. Mutine took the crew of 86, some of whom were Americans, prisoner. Mutine had suffered only two men slightly wounded in the engagement.

The American privateer Alexander later recaptured Invincible, only to lose her to boats from Shannon and Tenedos on 16 May. The British then sent Invincible to Halifax. Invincible did not reach Halifax. The American privateer Teazer re-re-captured her and sent her into Portland.

Alexander did not survive much longer; Rattler drove her ashore off Kenebank on 19 May. Alexander's crew escaped, whilst Rattler pulled off the ship herself and salvaged it with the assistance of the schooner Bream.

From 7 June 1814 Mutine sailed under Commander James Athill in the Leeward Islands. From 15 October her captain was Commander James Mould.

=== Later years, and at Algiers ===
She took part in Lord Exmouth's punitive expedition against the Dey of Algiers, and was present at the Bombardment of Algiers in 1816. During the bombardment she was anchored off the port bow of HMS Impregnable, whilst the other sloops kept under way. She suffered no casualties. (Note: A first-class share of the prize money was worth £1068 11s 6¼d; a sixth class share was worth £4 10s 2½d.) In 1847 the Admiralty awarded the Naval General Service Medal with clasp "Algiers" to still living claimants who had been present on 27 August 1816.

In October Commander William Sargent took command for the Cork Station. Mutine spent most of her remaining years patrol between the south coast of England and Cork, Ireland.

== Fate ==
The "Principal Officers and Commissioners of His Majesty's Navy" offered Mutine for sale at Plymouth on 3 February 1819. She was sold on that day to G. Young for £1,310.
