= HMS Agamemnon (1781) =

Third-rate ship of the line of the Royal Navy

Coordinates: 34°55′59″S 54°58′52″W

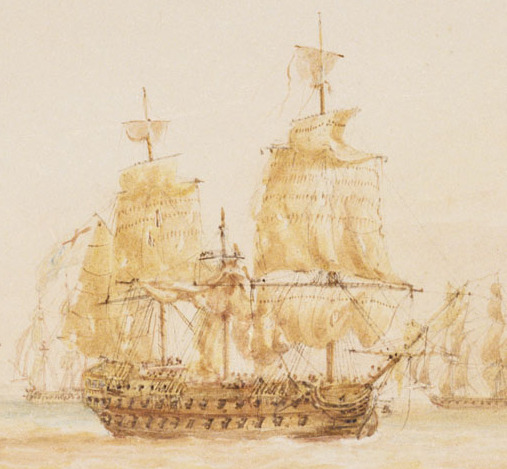
- Agamemnon at the action of 22 October 1793

History

Great Britain
- Name: HMS Agamemnon
- Ordered: 8 April 1777
- Builder: Henry Adams, Bucklers Hard
- Cost: £38,303 15s 4d
- Laid down: May 1777
- Launched: 10 April 1781
- Commissioned: 28 March 1781
- Nickname(s): Eggs-and-Bacon
- Fate: Wrecked in Maldonado Bay Uruguay, 16 June 1809
- Notes: Participated in: Battle of Ushant, 1781; Battle of the Saintes, 1782; Battle of Genoa, 1795; Battle of the Hyères Islands, 1795; Battle of Copenhagen, 1801; Battle of Cape Finisterre, 1805; Battle of Trafalgar, 1805; Battle of San Domingo, 1806; Battle of Copenhagen, 1807

General characteristics
- Class & type: Ardent-class ship of the line
- Tons burthen: 1,384 bm
- Length: 160 ft (49 m) (gundeck)
- Beam: 44 ft 4 in (13.51 m)
- Depth of hold: 19 ft (5.8 m)
- Propulsion: Sails
- Sail plan: Full-rigged ship
- Complement: 500 officers and men
- Armament: 64 guns: Gundeck: 26 × 24-pounders; Upper gundeck: 26 × 18-pounders; Quarterdeck: 10 × 4-pounders; Forecastle: 2 × 9-pounders

HMS Agamemnon was a 64-gun third-rate ship of the line of the Royal Navy. She saw service in the American War of Independence and French Revolutionary and Napoleonic Wars and fought in many major naval battles. She is remembered as Horatio Nelson's favourite ship, and she was named after the mythical ancient Greek king Agamemnon, the first ship of the Royal Navy to bear the name.

The future Lord Nelson served as Agamemnon's captain from January 1793 for three years and three months, during which time she saw considerable service in the Mediterranean. After Nelson's departure, she was involved in the infamous 1797 mutinies at Spithead and the Nore, and in 1801, she was present at the first Battle of Copenhagen, but she ran aground before being able to enter the action.

Despite Nelson's fondness for the ship, she frequently needed repair and refitting and would likely have been hulked or scrapped in 1802 had the war with France not recommenced. She fought at the Battle of Trafalgar on 21 October 1805 as part of Nelson's weather column, where she forced the surrender of the Spanish four-decker Santísima Trinidad. Agamemnon's later career was served in South American waters off Brazil.

Her worn-out and poor condition contributed to her being wrecked when, in June 1809, she grounded on an uncharted shoal in the mouth of the River Plate whilst seeking shelter with the rest of her squadron from a storm. All hands and most of the ship's stores were saved, but the condition of the ship's timbers made it impossible to free the ship; her captain was cleared of responsibility for the ship's loss thanks to documents detailing her defects. In 1993, the wreck of Agamemnon was located, and several artefacts have since been recovered, including one of her cannons.

== Construction ==
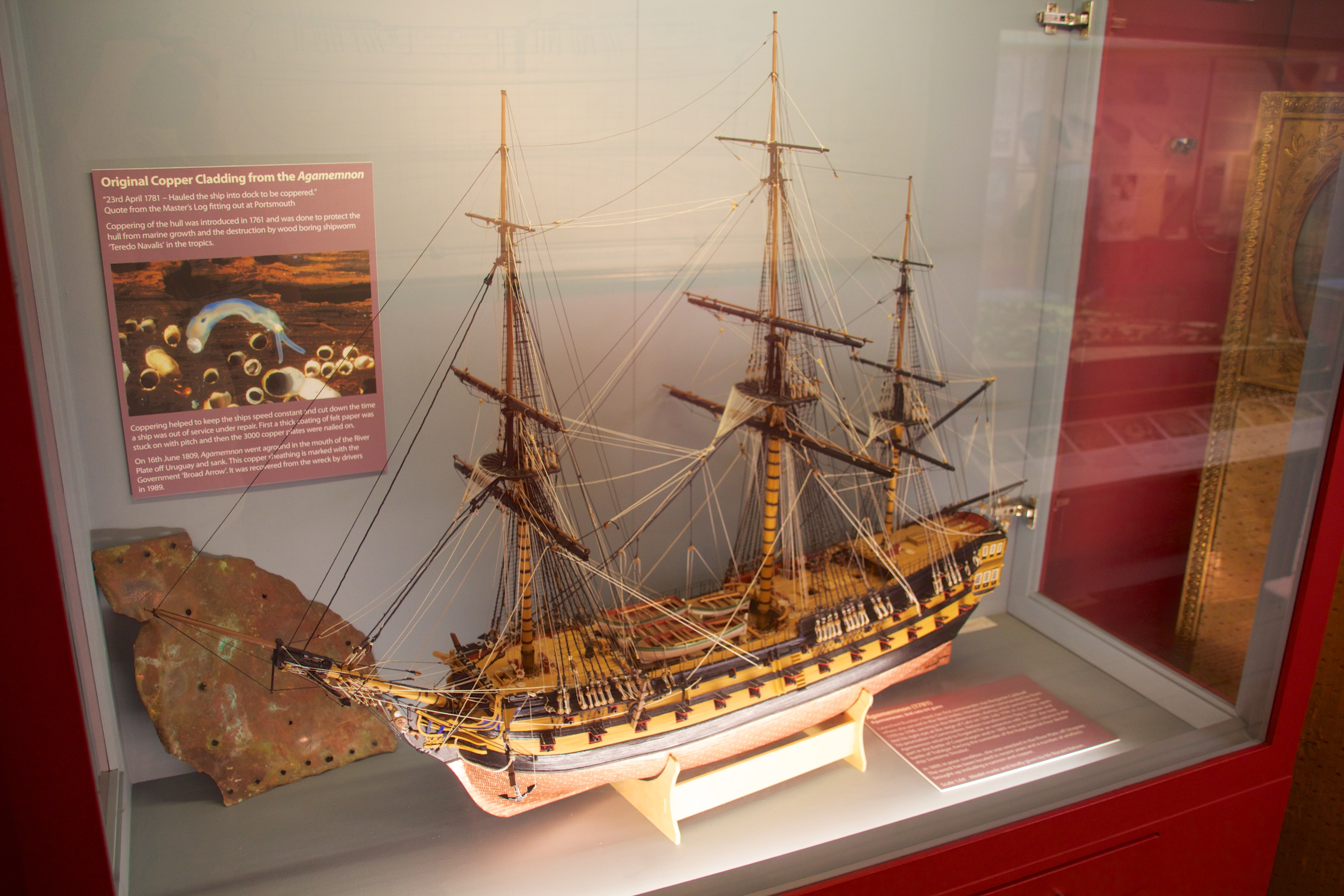
A model of Agamemnon at Bucklers Hard

Agamemnon was ordered from the commercial shipbuilder Henry Adams at his Bucklers Hard shipyard on the Beaulieu River on 5 February 1777 to be built to the lines of the Ardent class, as designed by Sir Thomas Slade. Her keel was laid down in May. She was constructed using timber sourced from the surrounding New Forest. The total cost of her construction was £38,303 15s 4d. She was commissioned on 28 March 1781 under Captain Benjamin Caldwell—a full 13 days before her launch on 10 April.

A painting of the launch of Agamemnon by Harold Wyllie depicts blue skies and scores of spectators despite the Hampshire Chronicle describing the day as windy with heavy rain and with few spectators in attendance.

She was named after King Agamemnon, a prominent figure in ancient Greek mythology who participated in the siege of Troy and was the first Royal Navy vessel to bear the name. Lord Nelson regarded her as his favourite ship and to her crew, she was known by the affectionate nickname 'Eggs–and–Bacon'. According to an article in The Gentleman's Magazine, her crew renamed her as they did not like the classical names that were in vogue at the Admiralty during this period (the crews of Bellerophon and Polyphemus also 'renamed' their ships to 'Billy Ruffian' and 'Polly Infamous' respectively, for the same reason).

== American War of Independence ==
In November 1781, the British Admiralty had received intelligence that a large convoy was preparing to sail from Brest under Admiral de Guichen. The convoy was composed of transports carrying naval supplies for the West Indies and the French fleet in the East Indies. Agamemnon was part of Admiral Richard Kempenfelt's squadron of 18 ships (11 of which mounted 64 or more guns), which he commanded from HMS Victory. Kempenfelt was ordered to intercept the convoy, which he did in the afternoon of 12 December in the Bay of Biscay, approximately 150 miles (241.4 km) south-west of Ushant. With the French naval escort to leeward of the convoy, Kempenfelt attacked immediately, capturing 15 of the transports before nightfall. The rest of the convoy scattered, most returning to Brest; only five transports reached the West Indies.

Early in 1782, she sailed to the West Indies as part of Admiral Sir George Rodney's squadron, with Rear-Admiral Sir Samuel Hood as his second in command. On 9 April, the Battle of the Saintes began with an indecisive skirmish, in which the ships of the vanguard division, under Hood's command, were severely damaged and forced to withdraw to make repairs. On 12 April, Agamemnon took part in the second action, which proved much more decisive. During the battle, Agamemnon had two lieutenants and 14 crewmen killed, and 22 others were wounded.

After the signing of the Treaties of Versailles brought an end to the Anglo-French War, Agamemnon returned from the West Indies to Chatham, where she was paid off and docked on 29 October 1783 for repairs and to have her copper sheathing replaced. She came out of dock on 4 June 1784 and was subsequently laid up in ordinary.

== French Revolutionary Wars ==
=== Under Nelson ===
In anticipation of the start of Britain's involvement in the French Revolutionary Wars after the execution of King Louis XVI, Agamemnon was recommissioned on 31 January 1793. She was placed under the command of Captain Horatio Nelson and, after provisioning, joined the fleet lying at anchor at the Nore. She subsequently sailed to join the Mediterranean fleet under Vice-Admiral Hood, which was blockading the French port of Toulon. On 27 August, the town of Toulon declared its allegiance to the Royalist Bourbon cause, and Hood's fleet moved in to take control of the naval dockyard and the 30 French ships of the line in the harbour. After capturing 19 ships, Agamemnon was sent to Naples to ask King Ferdinand IV for reinforcements to secure the town; he agreed to provide 4,000 men. When the French Revolutionary Army, commanded by Napoleon Bonaparte, launched its assault against Toulon, the troops proved insufficient to hold it, and they were forced to abandon the town. Later in the autumn, Agamemnon fought the inconclusive Action of 22 October 1793 against a French frigate squadron off Sardinia.

In April and May 1794, seamen from Agamemnon, led by Nelson, helped capture the Corsican town of Bastia. The French surrendered on 21 May after a 40-day siege. After this action, Agamemnon was forced to sail to Gibraltar to undergo urgent repairs. The ship became worn out after just 16 months at sea despite having undergone a fairly extensive refit before being recommissioned. Upon completion of her repairs, Agamemnon returned to Corsica, anchoring south of Calvi on 18 June. After Hood arrived with additional ships, Agamemnon contributed guns and men to the 51-day siege of Calvi, during which time Nelson lost sight in his right eye when a French shot kicked sand and grit into his face. The town surrendered on 10 August, Agamemnon having lost six men in the engagement. Shortly after that, the inhabitants of Corsica declared themselves to be subjects of His Majesty King George III.

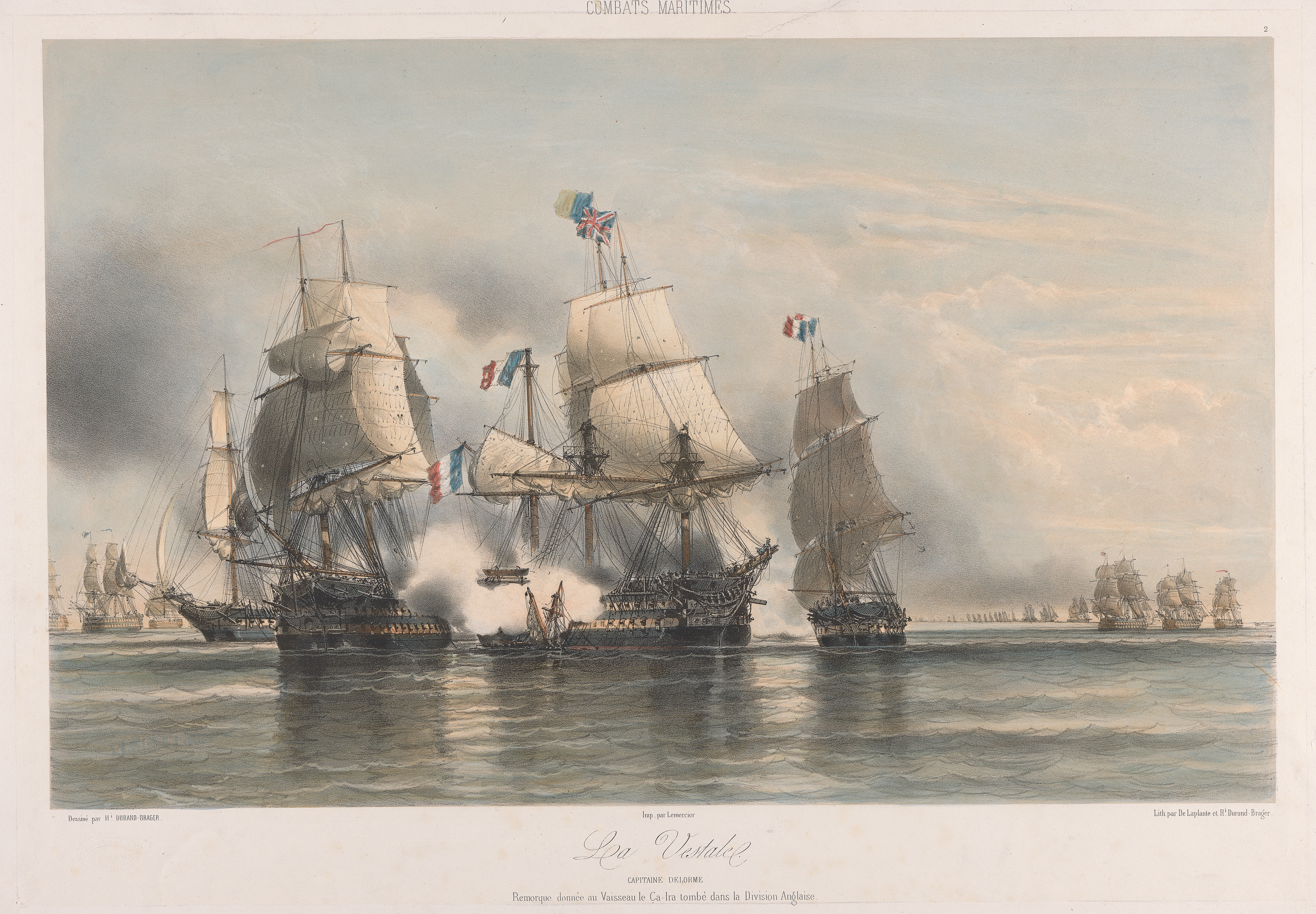
Agamemnon (left) battling Ça Ira on 13 March 1795. The frigates HMS Inconstant (left, background) and Vestale (right) are also visible.

Agamemnon, still with the Mediterranean fleet—now under Vice-Admiral William Hotham, who had superseded Hood in December 1794—participated in the Battle of Genoa when a French fleet, comprising 15 ships of the line, was sighted on 10 March 1795. Three days later, the French having shown no signs that they were willing to give battle, Admiral Hotham ordered a general chase. The French ship Ça Ira lost her fore and main topmasts when she ran into one of the other ships of the French fleet, Victoire, allowing HMS Inconstant to catch up with and engage her. Agamemnon and Captain came up to assist soon after, and continued firing into the 80-gun French ship until the arrival of more French ships led to Admiral Hotham signalling for the British ships to retreat. Ça Ira was captured the following day, along with Censeur, which was towing her, by Captain and Bedford.

On 7 July 1795, whilst in company with a small squadron of frigates, Agamemnon was chased by a French fleet of 22 ships of the line and 6 frigates. Due to adverse winds, Admiral Hotham was unable to come to her aid until the following day, and the French fleet was sighted again on 13 July, off the Hyères Islands. Hotham signalled for his 23 ships of the line to give chase, and in the ensuing Battle of the Hyères Islands, Agamemnon was one of the few Royal Navy ships to engage the enemy fleet.^{[a]} The French ship Alcide struck her colours during the battle, only to catch fire and sink. Many of the other French ships were in a similar condition; Agamemnon and Cumberland were manoeuvring to attack a French 80-gun ship when Admiral Hotham signalled his fleet to retreat, allowing the French to escape into the Gulf of Fréjus. Admiral Hotham was later greatly criticised for calling off the battle, and was relieved as Commander-in-Chief in the Mediterranean by Admiral Sir John Jervis at the end of the year.

Nelson was promoted to Commodore on 11 March. Shortly thereafter, in the action of 31 May 1796, boats from Agamemnon and Nelson's squadron captured a small convoy of French vessels off the Franco-Italian coast, while suffering minimal casualties.

On 10 June 1796 Nelson transferred his pennant to HMS Captain, Captain John Samuel Smith replacing him as Agamemnon's commander. Having been deemed in great need of repair, Agamemnon then returned to England.

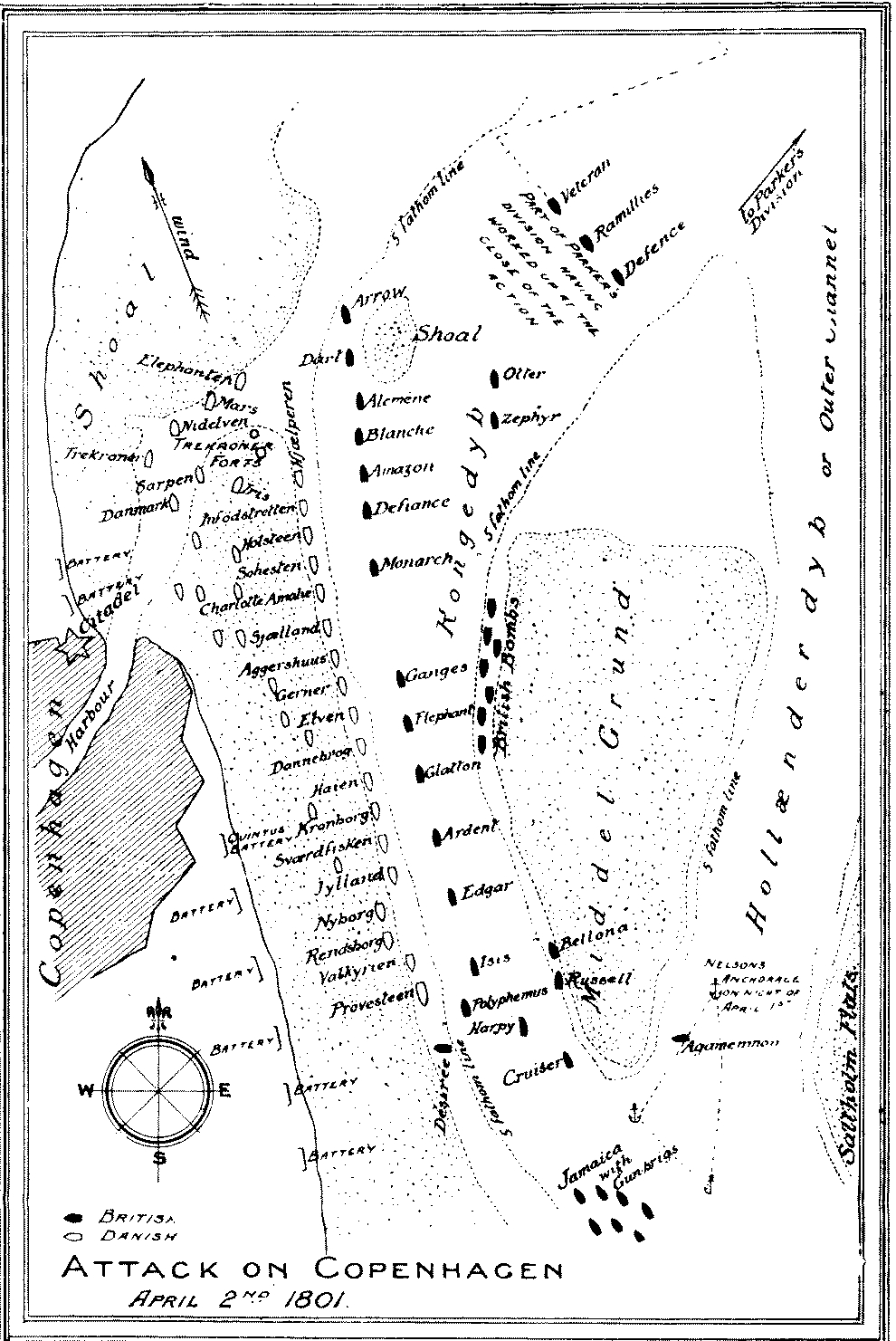
Diagram of the Battle of Copenhagen, showing Agamemnon grounded near the Middle Ground

=== Mutiny and the Baltic ===
In May 1797, whilst under the command of Captain Robert Fancourt, Agamemnon was involved in the Nore mutiny. On 29 May, the North Sea squadron lying in the Yarmouth Roads was ordered to sea. Only three ships, Adamant, Agamemnon and Glatton, obeyed the signal, but Agamemnon's crew later mutinied, and sailed the ship back to Yarmouth Roads. The ship was then taken to join the main mutiny at the Nore anchorage, along with Ardent, Isis and Leopard, arriving on 7 June. After a blockade of London was formed by the mutineers, several ships began to desert the wider mutiny, in many cases being fired upon by the remaining ships. Order was eventually restored aboard Agamemnon when the loyal seamen and marines forcibly ejected the hard-line mutineers from the ship. Captain Fancourt was able to secure a pardon for the remaining ship's company.

On 18 March 1800, Agamemnon was damaged when she ran onto the Penmarks Rocks. She came into Falmouth on 25 March 1800. On her way to port she had encountered Childers, which assisted her and accompanied her into port. With the assistance of the crews from two sloops, the guardship Chatham, and troops from Pendennis Castle at the pumps, the crew managed to stop the water level in the hold rising any further. Agamemnon made for Plymouth for repairs. Movement caused the leak to gain on the men at the pumps once more, and when she was off Penlee Point, Agamemnon fired a gun for assistance. When she reached Plymouth she was lashed to a sheer hulk to prevent her sinking.

In response to developments in the Baltic in 1801 that threatened to deprive Britain of much-needed naval supplies, Agamemnon was sent as part of a fleet under Admiral Sir Hyde Parker and Vice-Admiral Lord Nelson to attack the Danish at Copenhagen. On 2 April, Agamemnon was part of Nelson's division that fought the Battle of Copenhagen. Agamemnon was positioned second in the line after HMS Edgar, and after passing down the Outer Channel, she grounded whilst attempting to round the southern tip of the Middle Ground shoal. While the battle raged around her Agamemnon, along with Bellona and Russell, both of which had also run aground, flew signals of distress. The three stranded ships were eventually pulled off the Middle Ground in the night of 3 April.

After the Treaty of Amiens concluded the French Revolutionary Wars, Agamemnon was laid up at Chatham in 1802.

== Napoleonic Wars ==
Agamemnon's general condition in 1802 was so poor that, had hostilities with France not recommenced, she would likely have been hulked or broken up. Instead, after Britain's entry into the Napoleonic Wars, she was brought out of ordinary in 1804, recommissioned under Captain John Harvey on 31 July, and went to join the Channel fleet under Admiral William Cornwallis.

Agamemnon was part of Vice-Admiral Robert Calder's fleet cruising off Cape Finisterre on 22 July 1805, when the combined Franco-Spanish fleet from the West Indies was sighted to windward. The British ships formed into line of battle, with Agamemnon fifth in the line, and engaged Admiral Villeneuve's fleet in hazy conditions with light winds. Agamemnon had three men wounded in the Battle of Cape Finisterre, and lost her mizzen topmast and the foresail yard. By nightfall, Calder's fleet had become scattered, and he signalled for the action to be discontinued.

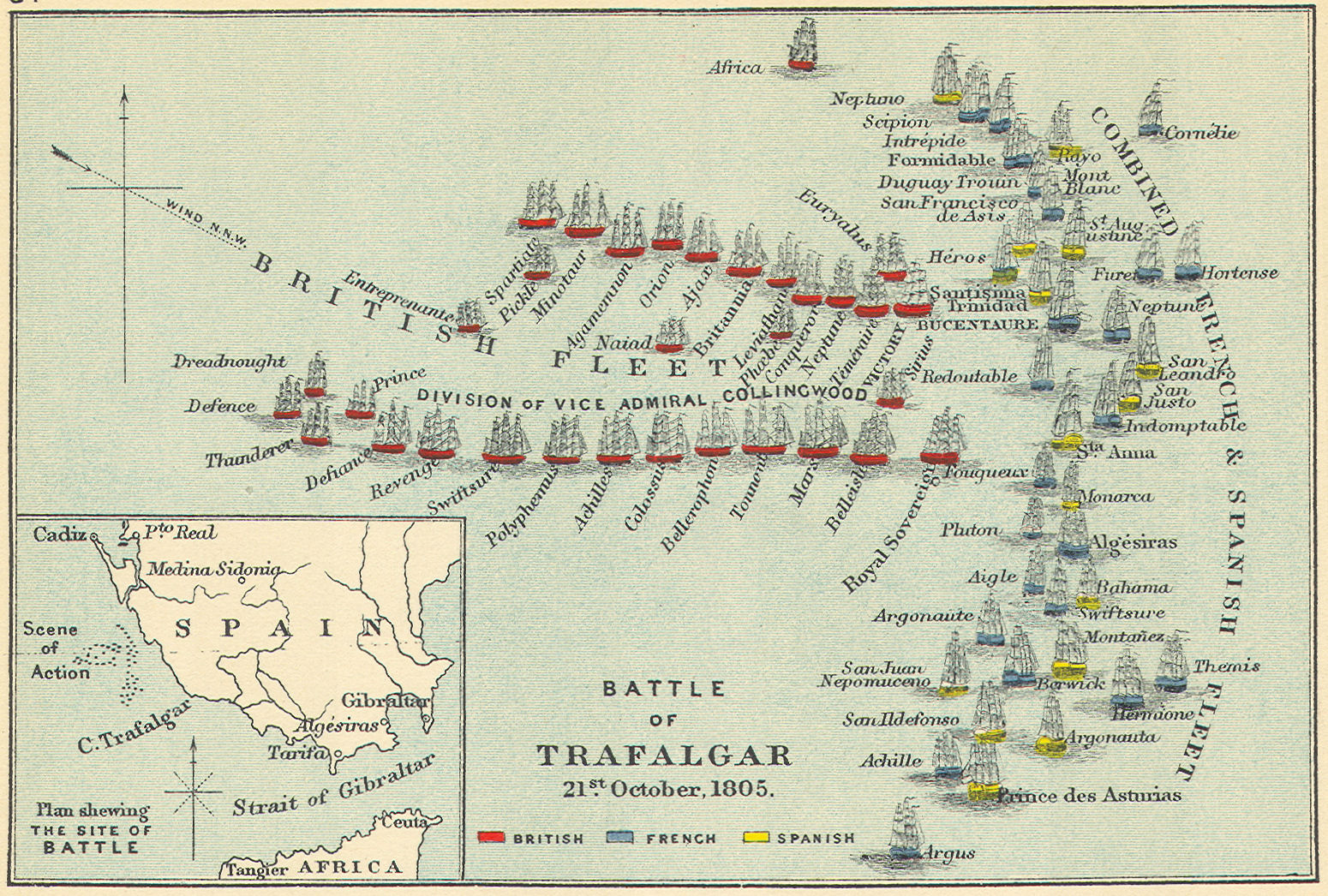
Ship positions at the beginning of the Battle of Trafalgar

=== Battle of Trafalgar ===
On 17 September 1805, after completing a small refit of his ship in Portsmouth, Captain Harvey was superseded in command of Agamemnon by Captain Sir Edward Berry, who had previously commanded Nelson's flagship, HMS Vanguard, at the Battle of the Nile. On 3 October she departed Spithead to join Vice-Admiral Nelson's fleet blockading Villeneuve's combined fleet in Cádiz. En route, Agamemnon fell in with a French squadron, consisting of six ships of the line and several smaller vessels, which gave chase. Succeeding in evading the French, Agamemnon joined the blockading squadron on 13 October, and when Nelson laid eyes on the approaching ship he reportedly exclaimed: "Here comes that damned fool Berry! Now we shall have a battle!" In misty conditions on 20 October, Agamemnon captured a large American merchant brig, which she then took in tow. Not long after, HMS Euryalus signalled to Agamemnon that she was sailing straight towards an enemy fleet of 30 ships—Villeneuve's fleet had left port.

On 21 October 1805 Agamemnon fought in the Battle of Trafalgar. Agamemnon was positioned eighth in Nelson's weather column, with Orion ahead and Minotaur astern. Once engaged, she was firing both batteries, eventually pounding the great Spanish four-decker Santísima Trinidad until that ship was dismasted and, with 216 of her complement dead, struck her colours. Before Berry could take possession of the prize, the enemy van division began bearing down on the British line, having previously been cut off from the battle by Nelson's line-breaking tactics. With Nelson already dying below decks on Victory, Captain of the Fleet Thomas Hardy ordered Agamemnon and several other ships to intercept them. Three of the enemy ships broke off and ran for Cádiz; after briefly engaging Intrépide the British ships moved to try to cut off the fleeing ships. Over the course of the battle, Agamemnon suffered just two fatalities, and eight men were wounded.

Following the battle, Agamemnon, despite taking on three feet of water in her hold each hour, took Colossus under tow to Gibraltar. After carrying out repairs, the ship rejoined Vice-Admiral Collingwood's squadron, which had resumed the blockade of Cádiz.

=== Later career ===
At the beginning of 1806, Agamemnon was with Vice-Admiral Duckworth's squadron in the West Indies, pursuing a French fleet carrying troops to Santo Domingo. On 6 February 1806, the two squadrons clashed in the Battle of San Domingo; Agamemnon assisted Duckworth's flagship Superb in driving the French Vice-Admiral Leissègues' flagship Impérial onto the shore where she was wrecked. In October, Agamemnon escorted a convoy on her return to Britain.

In 1807 Agamemnon was part of Admiral James Gambier's fleet sent to take control of the Danish fleet before it could fall into French hands. She participated in the second Battle of Copenhagen, and as in the first in 1801, ran aground. After she had come free, Agamemnon landed guns and shot in Kjörge Bay to form part of a battery being established there to command the city. Firing commenced on 2 September, and lasted until the Danes surrendered on 7 September. In November, Agamemnon joined the blockading squadron off Lisbon.

== Loss ==
In February 1808, Agamemnon sailed with Rear-Admiral Sir Sidney Smith's flagship Foudroyant to Brazil, where they joined another squadron. At Rio de Janeiro it was discovered that Agamemnon was again quite worn out, with seams in her planking opening and some of her framing bolts broken. In October, Agamemnon and Monarch anchored in Maldonado Bay, in the mouth of the River Plate. They had been escorting the merchant vessel Maria, which had carried the surgeon Dr. James Paroissien to Montevideo where he was tasked with exposing a plot against King John VI of Portugal, who was in exile in Brazil. Whilst there, Monarch ran aground, requiring Agamemnon's assistance to get her off. After learning that Paroissien had been imprisoned, the two ships put to sea, but were forced to return to Maldonado Bay when they encountered bad weather. After the ships returned to Rio in January 1809, the ship was fully surveyed by the carpenter, who drew up an extensive list of her defects.

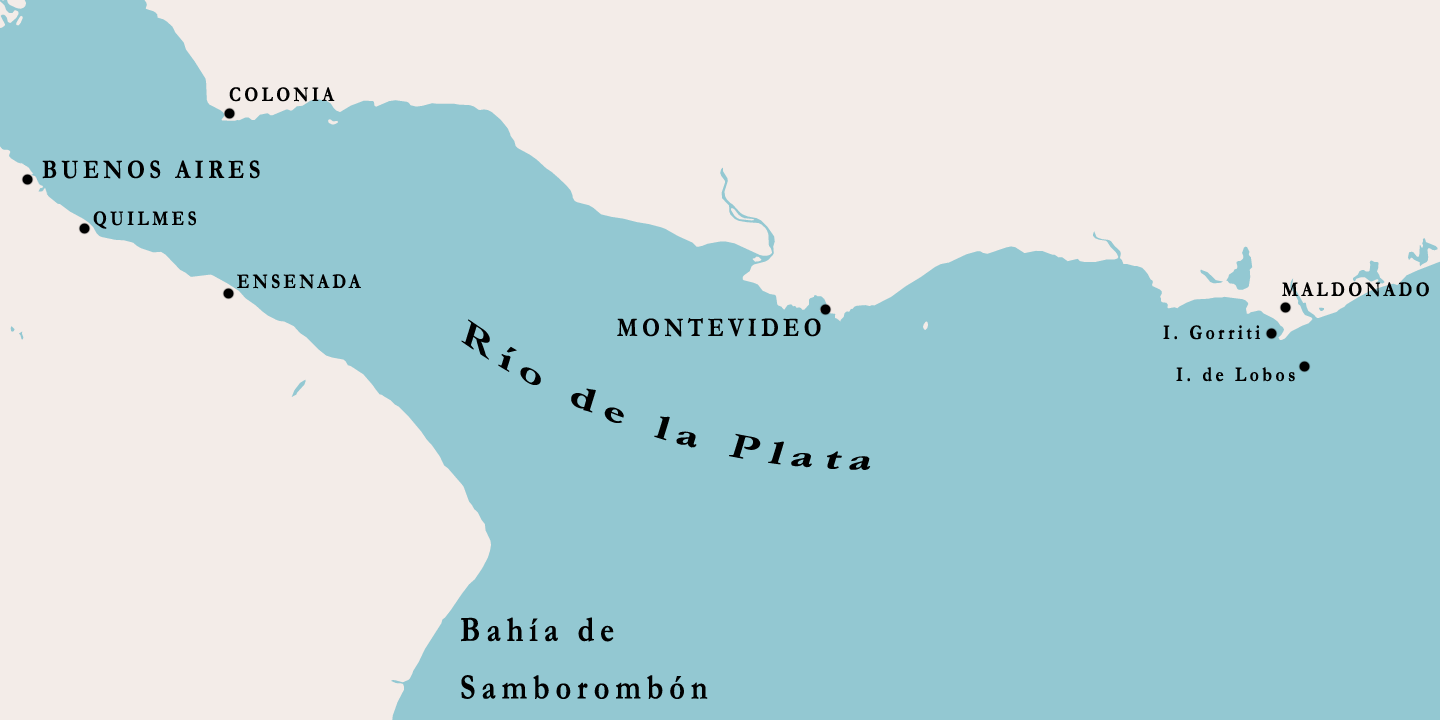
Mouth of the River Plate, showing the location of Maldonado and Gorriti Island (right)

On 16 June 1809, Agamemnon, along with the rest of the squadron (which was now under the command of Rear-Admiral Michael de Courcy), put into Maldonado Bay for the third and final time, to shelter from a storm. While working her way between Gorriti Island and the shore, Agamemnon struck an uncharted shoal. Captain Jonas Rose attempted to use the ship's boats, together with the stream and kedge anchors, to pull the ship off, but to no avail. The ship had dropped anchor on the shoal just previously, and it was discovered that she had run onto it when she grounded, the anchor having pierced the hull. On 17 June, with the ship listing heavily to starboard, Agamemnon's stores and all her crew were taken off by boats from other vessels in the squadron, and the following day Captain Rose and his officers left the ship.

The court-martial for the loss of Agamemnon was held at Rio de Janeiro on 22 July 1809, aboard HMS Bedford. It was found that the ship might have been saved if she had not been in such poor general condition, and Captain Rose was honourably acquitted.

HMS Nancy arrived on 4 August, and stayed with the transports Kingston and Neptune as they salvaged what could be salvaged from Agamemnon. Neptune left on 22 September, but Kingston and Nancy stayed as Kingston continued salvage efforts. On 16 November a gale came up and late the next day boats sent to the wreck reported that she was strewn in pieces all over the beach. On 28 November Nancy and Kingston departed together, but soon separated with Nancy sailing for Rio de Janeiro, which she reached on 15 December.

== Legacy ==
In March 1993, the wreck was located north of Gorriti Island in Maldonado, Uruguay Bay Punta del Este by sonar operator Crayton Fenn. Sonar used was a Klien 595 system. Later in 1997, with the help of Mensun Bound, they documented the remains and recovered several artefacts, including a seal bearing the name 'Nelson,' and one of Agamemnon's 24-pounder guns from her main gundeck.

The historical novelist Patrick O'Brian selected Agamemnon as one of the ships on which Jack Aubrey served as lieutenant before the events of Master and Commander, the first novel in his Aubrey–Maturin series. Agamemnon has also been the subject of paintings by the British artist Geoff Hunt, a former president of the Royal Society of Marine Artists.

To mark the bicentenary of the Battle of Trafalgar, in 2005, the Woodland Trust planted 33 woods named after Royal Navy ships that fought in the battle: one each for the 27 ships of the line and six others for the frigates and smaller support craft. Agamemnon wood was planted in November 2005 on the Beaulieu Estate in Hampshire, near where Agamemnon was constructed.

The Royal Navy adopted the name 'Agamemnon' for one of their Astute-class nuclear submarines, constructed in the UK. HMS Agamemnon was commissioned on 22 September 2025.

Agamemnon Channel in the Sunshine Coast region of British Columbia, at the mouth of Jervis Inlet between Nelson Island and the Sechelt Peninsula, was named for Agamemnon by Captain George Henry Richards of HMS Plumper in 1860.

Herman Melville chooses the Agamemnon for the origin of the old Dansker in his novella Billy Budd.

Historical fantasy novelist Natasha Pulley uses the Agamemnon as a significant setting in her alternate history novel The Kingdoms.

The Scottish poet Hamish Maclaren included "Ballad of the Agamemnon" in his 1930 collection Sailor with Banjo. It was later set to music by folk singer Paul Davenport and released by The Teacups (with some alterations from Maclaren's words) as "Agamemnon" on their 2020 album In Which ...

== Notes ==
a. Besides Agamemnon, the other engaged British ships were Blenheim, Captain, Culloden, Cumberland, Defence and Victory.
