= Peter Spicer =

English cricketer

Personal information
- Full name: Peter Alfred Spicer
- Born: 11 May 1939; Ilford, Essex, England
- Died: 18 August 1969 (aged 30); Hainault, Essex, England
- Batting: Left-handed
- Bowling: Slow left-arm orthodox

Domestic team information
- Years: Team
- 1962–1963: Essex

Career statistics
Competition	First-class	List A
Matches	17	1
Runs scored	526	6
Batting average	19.48	6.00
100s/50s	–/4	–/–
Top score	86	6
Balls bowled	67	2
Wickets	2	1
Bowling average	27.50	1.00
5 wickets in innings	–	–
10 wickets in match	–	–
Best bowling	2/1	1/1
Catches/stumpings	4/–	–/–
- Source: Cricinfo, 25 October 2011

Peter Alfred Spicer (11 May 1939 – 18 August 1969) was an English cricketer. Spicer was a left-handed batsman who bowled slow left-arm orthodox. He was born at Ilford, Essex.

Spicer made his first-class debut for Essex against Somerset in the 1962 County Championship. His first scoring shot in the match was a six in a debut innings of 80. He made sixteen further first-class appearances for Essex, the last of which came against Kent in the 1963 County Championship. In his seventeen matches he scored just 526 runs at an average of 19.48, with a high score of 86. This score, which was one of four fifties he made, came against the touring Pakistanis in 1962. With the ball, he took 2 first-class wickets. Both these wickets came in the same match against Middlesex in 1962, when he took the wickets of Don Bennett and Alan Moss, taking figures of 2/1 from 1.1 overs. Most of his first-class appearances came in 1962, despite struggling to get in the Essex side in 1963, he did make a single List A appearance in the inaugural Gillette Cup against Lancashire. In this match, which was also the first ever List A match Essex played, Spicer took the wicket of Ken Higgs in his second delivery of the match, while with the bat he scored 6 runs before he was dismissed by Jack Dyson, with Lancashire winning by 81 runs. He continued to play Second XI cricket for Essex, but made no further major appearances, leaving the county at the end of the 1966 season.

He coached cricket after leaving Essex, spending the summer of 1969 coaching in the Netherlands. Returning to England, he was killed in a car accident on 15 August 1969 at Hainault, Essex.
