= HMS Foudroyant (1798) =

Ship of the line of the Royal Navy

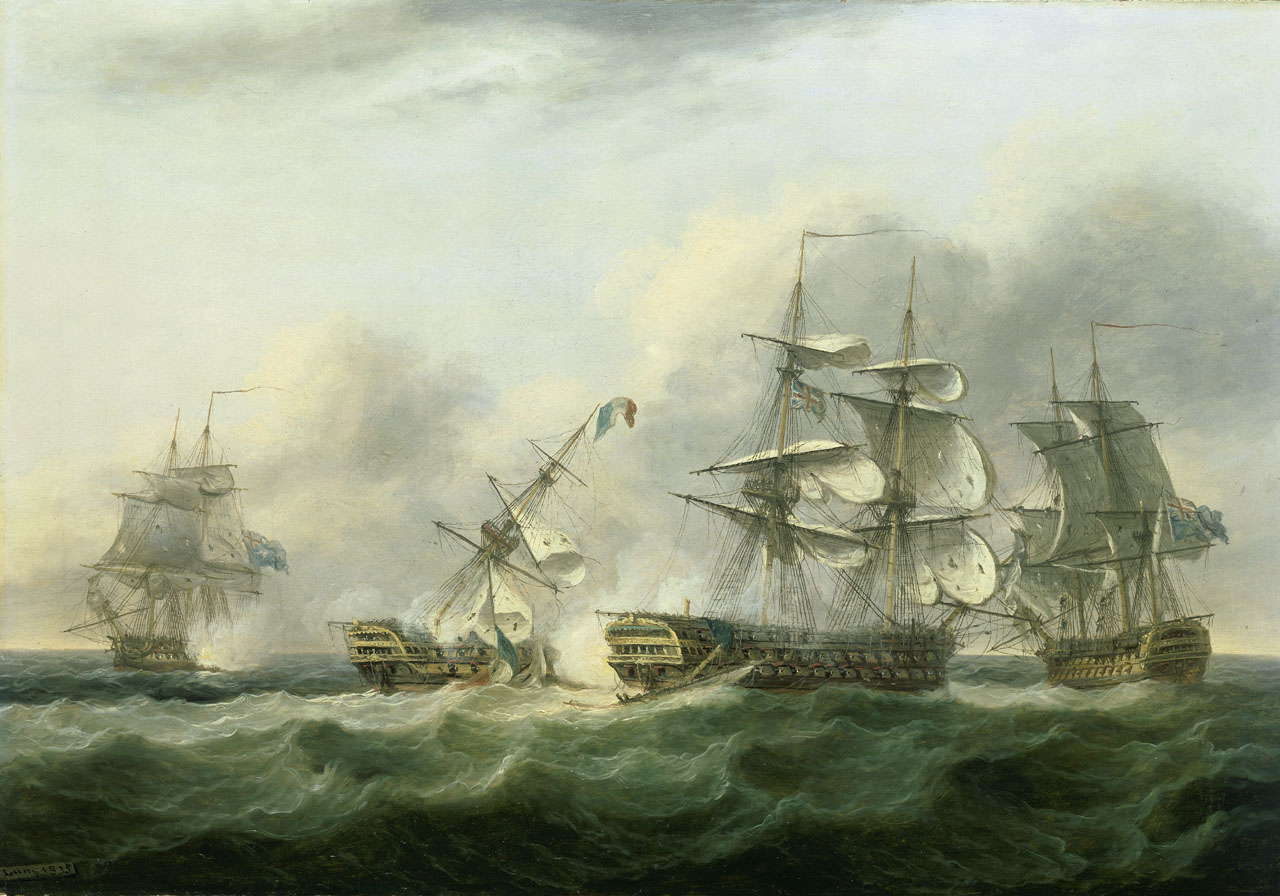
- Foudroyant (second from right) at the action of 31 March 1800

History

Great Britain
- Name: HMS Foudroyant
- Ordered: 17 January 1788
- Builder: Plymouth Dock
- Laid down: May 1789
- Launched: 31 March 1798
- Honours and awards: Naval General Service Medal with clasps: "12th October 1798"; "Egypt"
- Fate: Sold 1890. Foundered on Blackpool Sands, 16 June 1897.

General characteristics
- Class & type: 80-gun third rate
- Tons burthen: 2054 65/94 (bm)
- Length: 184 ft 8 1/2 in (56.299 m)(gundeck)
- Beam: 50 ft 6 in (15.39 m)
- Draught: 23 ft (7.0 m)
- Depth of hold: 22 ft 6 in (6.86 m)
- Propulsion: Sails
- Sail plan: Full-rigged ship
- Complement: 650 officers and men
- Armament: 80 guns: (Note: As given by Goodwin. Lavery quotes similarly, though the carronades are absent.); Gundeck: 30 × 32-pounder guns; Upper gundeck: 32 × 24-pounder guns; QD: 14 × 12-pounder guns; Fc: 4 × 12-pounder guns; 2 × 32-pounder carronades; Poop deck: 6 × 18-pounder carronades

HMS Foudroyant was an 80-gun third rate of the Royal Navy, one of only two British-built 80-gun ships of the period (the other was HMS Caesar). Foudroyant was built in the dockyard at Plymouth Dock (a.k.a. Devonport) and launched on 31 March 1798. (Note: Goodwin (p.179) gives the launch date for Foudroyant as 31 March, 25 May, and 31 August. The text highlights this discrepancy and attributes the August date to Lyon's Sailing Navy List, published in 1993. Dates given for commissioning and other movements, which are taken from the ship's logs, indicate that the March date is correct. A painting depicting the launch, dated 25 May 1798, adds further confusion, though it is not clear from the text if the date represents the launching or the date the painting was finished.) Foudroyant served Nelson as his flagship from 6 June 1799 until the end of June 1800.

Foudroyant had a long and successful career, and although she was not involved in any major fleet action, she did provide invaluable service to numerous admirals throughout her 17 years on active service. In her last years she became a training vessel for boys.

== Design ==
Her designer was Sir John Henslow. She was named after the 80-gun Foudroyant, which Swiftsure and Monmouth, both 70-gun ships, and Hampton Court (64 guns), had captured from the French on 28 February 1758.

Foudroyant was a one-off design. She followed French practice of favouring large two-decked, third rates mounting 80 guns rather than the typical British preference for building three-decked second-rate ships mounting 98 guns. The two ship types, despite the difference in absolute gun numbers, had similar gun power but the British thought the second rate had a more imposing appearance and some advantages in battle, while they considered the 80 gun ship as usually faster and less 'leewardly'.

== French Revolutionary War ==
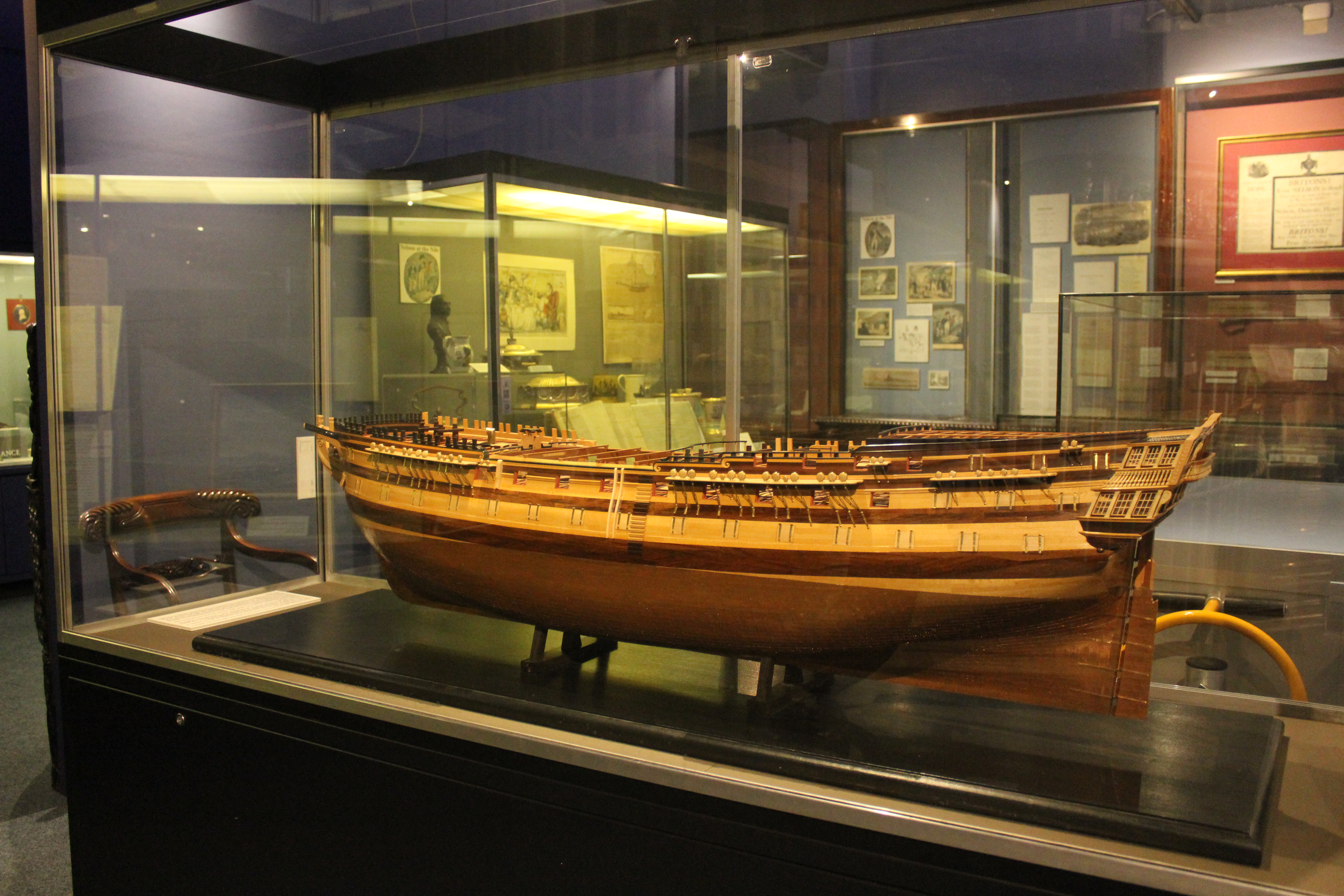
A model of Foudroyant in Monmouth Museum

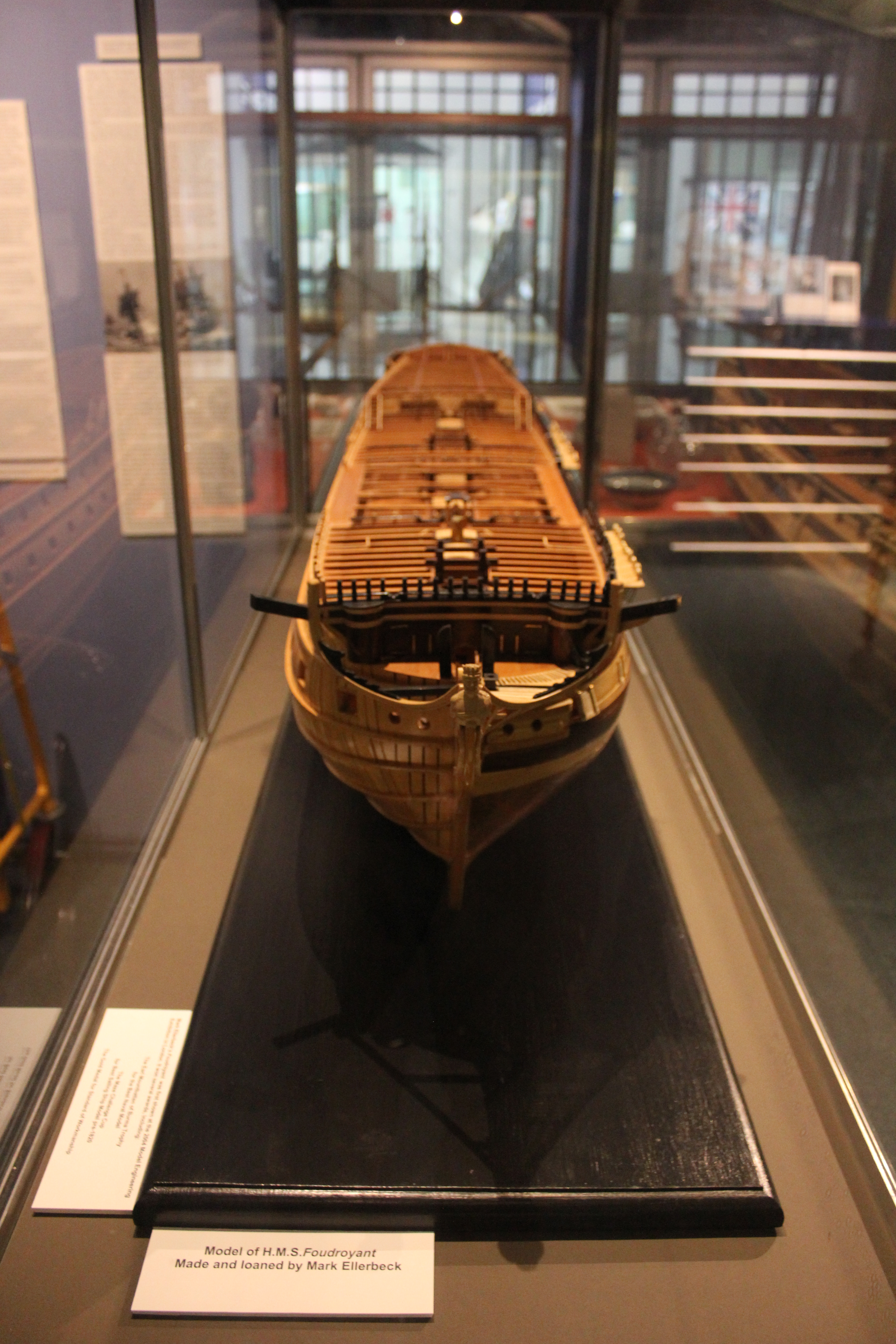

Foudroyant was first commissioned on 25 May 1798, under the command of Captain Thomas Byard. On 12 October Foudroyant was with the squadron under Captain Sir John Borlase Warren in Canada engaged a French squadron under Commodore Jean-Baptiste-François Bompart in the Battle of Tory Island. The British captured the French ship of the line Hoche and four of the eight French frigates. Foudroyant was only minimally engaged, though she did suffer nine men wounded, and went off in unsuccessful pursuit of the French frigates that had escaped. (Other British warships captured two of these frigates; two frigates and a schooner escaped completely). In 1847 The Admiralty awarded the Naval General Service Medal with clasp "12th October 1798" to all surviving claimants from the action.

Byard's command lasted only until 31 October when, after bringing the ship back to Plymouth, he died. Commander William Butterfield took temporary command of the ship until he transferred to Hazard just twelve days later.

Captain John Elphinstone took up command of the ship on 26 November 1798, in Cawsand Bay. Lord Keith hoisted his flag in Foudroyant on 28 November, and she departed to join the Mediterranean Squadron on 5 December. After arriving at Gibraltar, Keith shifted his flag to Barfleur on 31 December, and Captain Elphinstone left the ship the following day. His replacement was Captain James Richard Dacres.

Dacres' command lasted for four months, before Captain William Brown replaced him on 22 March 1799. On 30 March Foudroyant was among the several British warships in sight, and so entitled to share in the prize money, when Alcmene captured Saint Joseph or Hermosa Andalusia, off Cadiz.

Foudroyant sailed from Gibraltar on 11 May, calling at Port Mahon before arriving at Palermo on 7 June. At this time, Brown transferred to Vanguard, and Captain Thomas Hardy took over the command. The following day, Lord Nelson hoisted his flag in Foudroyant.

Over the following months, Foudroyant was involved in the efforts to return the Neapolitan royal family to Naples. Nelson's fleet arrived in Naples on 24 June. The fleet consisted of a total of 18 ships of the line, 1 frigate and 2 fire ships. (Note: Mutine, a brig-sloop of 16 guns should also be included in this tally. Ships known to have comprised this fleet are: Alexander, Bellerophon, Bellona, Culloden, Goliath, Leviathan, Majestic, Northumberland, Powerful, Swiftsure, Vanguard, Zealous(ships of the line); Syren (frigate); Mutine (brig-sloop).)

The British landed 500 British and Portuguese marines in support of the Neapolitans on 27 June, all under the command of Captain Sir Thomas Troubridge, of Culloden. The next day they captured the castles Ovo and Nuovo. On 29 June they commenced the siege of Fort St. Elmo. The first batteries were in place by 3 July, with the last still being constructed on 11 July. The British, Portuguese and Russian forces commenced the bombardment on 3 July and the French capitulated on 11 July, forestalling the need for an assault.

On 10 July His Sicilian Majesty arrived in the Bay of Naples and immediately hoisted his standard on board the Foudroyant. There the king and his ministers remained until after the capitulation of Fort St. Elmo. A series of reprisals against known insurgents followed. The Neapolitans conducted several courts martial, some of which resulted in hangings.

Whilst Foudroyant was in Naples harbour, Nelson began his affair with Emma, Lady Hamilton. Foudroyant departed Naples on 6 August, in company with Syren and the Portuguese ship Principe Real. Foudroyant also transported the Sardinian royal family to Leghorn on 22 September.

On 13 October, Foudroyant entered Port Mahon harbour, and Captain Sir Edward Berry replaced Captain Hardy as acting captain. Foudroyant was back in Palermo by 22 October. Nelson remained ashore when Foudroyant departed for Gozo on 29 October, together with Minotaur. In November, after weathering a storm in Palermo harbour, Foudroyant departed once more, this time with Culloden, and ran aground in the Straits of Messina. With Culloden's assistance, it was possible to haul the ship off and into deep water. On 6 December a large part of the 89th Regiment embarked on Foudroyant. (Note: The majority of the 89th came aboard at 0900 on 6 December, together with their women and children – 523 people in total.) The soldiers landed at St. Paul's Bay, on Malta on the 10th.

Foudroyant was back at Palermo on 15 January 1800, when Lord Nelson hoisted his flag in her once again, and she sailed on to Livorno, arriving on the 21st. There Foudroyant received salutes from Danish and Neapolitan frigates, and two Russian ships of the line.

On 26 January Foudroyant was in company with Minorca and Queen Charlotte when she recaptured the Ragusan polacca Annonciata, Michele Pepi, master. She was carrying grain from Tunis to Genoa.

Sicilian soldiers embarked on 11 February, and Foudroyant sailed the next day for Malta, in company with Alexander, Northumberland (both 74s), and Success (32). Audacious (74), and Corso (16) joined them later. On 18 February, the British squadron began a chase of a squadron of four French ships — Généreux (74), Badine (24), Fauvette (20), another corvette of 20 guns, and a fluyt. Alexander forced the fluyt to surrender, whilst Success engaged Généreux, and the two ships exchanged a couple of broadsides before Foudroyant came up and fired into Généreux, which struck her colours. (Note: The victory was of particular significance to Berry. In 1798, after the Battle of the Nile, he was returning to England in command of Leander when he encountered Généreux. After a lopsided and courageous battle with Généreux Berry had had to surrender. Subsequently, his captors maltreated Berry and his crew.) It turned out that Rear-Admiral Jean-Baptiste Perrée, the commander-in-chief of the French navy in the Mediterranean, had been aboard Généreux and had been killed at the start of the action. His ships had been carrying some 4,000 troops intended to relieve Malta. Their failure to arrive significantly harmed the French hold on Malta and was a testament to the success of the British blockade of the island. British casualties amounted to one man killed and eight wounded, all on Success.

At the beginning of March, Nelson remained at Palermo due to illness when on 25 March Foudroyant sailed for Malta once more with Rear-Admiral Decres on board. On 29 March, she encountered the sloop Bonne Citoyenne, and from her Berry learned that French ships were expected to leave Valletta that evening. Guillaume Tell put to sea on the evening of the 30th, where she encountered Lion and Penelope.

As day broke and the scene became apparent, Foudroyant maneuvered to pistol range of the French ship – the last French survivor of Aboukir, Généreux being the only other – and joined the battle. Foudroyant's log for the action of 31 March 1800 notes that at one point during the battle the French had nailed their colours to the stump of Guillaume Tell's mizzen mast. Still, Guillaume Tell eventually struck, but not before Foudroyant had lost her fore topmast and main topsail yard. The initial estimates put the number of dead and wounded on Lion and Foudroyant at 40 per vessel.

Later in the day, Foudroyant's mizzen mast fell, having been damaged during the battle. Lion took Foudroyant in tow for a time, whilst a jury rig was set up. She entered Syracuse on 3 April. Amongst the British vessels, Foudroyant had borne the heaviest casualties with eight men killed and 61 wounded, including Berry, who was only slightly wounded and did not leave the deck during the fight. The British estimated that the French had had over two hundred casualties.

On 3 June, the Neapolitan king and queen boarded Foudroyant, accompanied by Sir William Hamilton and his wife Emma. The royal family departed the ship after their arrival in Livorno on 15 June, and just two weeks later Nelson hauled down his flag and began the journey home to England overland together with the Hamiltons.

Lord Keith raised his flag in Foudroyant for the second time on 15 August, returning the ship to Gibraltar on 13 September. Captain Berry transferred out of the ship on 2 November for the 38-gun frigate Princess Charlotte.

Captain Philip Beaver took over the command on 17 November and sailed into the Eastern Mediterranean with a fleet of 51 vessels, many armed en flûte and carrying the 16,150 men of General Sir Ralph Abercromby's force, which was intended to drive the French out of Egypt. Still, on 22 December Foudroyant captured the French brig Hyppolite, which was carrying rice from Alexandria to Marseille.

Keith sailed from Marmarice on 22 February, arriving off Abukir Bay on 2 March. Sea conditions meant that the British were unable to land until 8 March. They met resistance from the French but by evening all the troops had landed and driven the French from the beach. The landing cost Foudroyant one man killed and one wounded. In all, the landings cost the British 22 men killed, 72 men wounded, and three missing.

On the 13th, the landing party of seamen and marines, under the command of Captain Sir William Sidney Smith, were again in action at Mandora as the British moved towards Alexandria. Foudroyant had one man wounded. In all, the British navy lost six seamen killed and 19 wounded, and 24 marines killed and 35 wounded.

Keith then used his ships to reduce the castle at the entrance of Abukir Bay, which eventually fell to the British on 18 March 1801. A French counter-attack on 21 March by some 20,000 men, although ending in defeat, caused General Abercromby a severe injury; he died aboard Foudroyant a week after the battle. In addition to the army losses, the Royal Navy lost four men killed and 20 wounded, though none were from Foudroyant.

Foudroyant lay off Alexandria until June, and on 17 June Captain Beaver transferred to Determinée. His replacement was Captain William Young, who in turn was replaced by Captain T. Stephenson.

Captain John Clarke Searle took command in June 1801, before handing over to Captain John Elphinstone, again, in September. In mid-August, the fleet transported the British Army to Alexandria. On 26 September the French proposed a three-day armistice to discuss terms of capitulation. Because Foudroyant had served in the navy's Egyptian campaign between 8 March 1801 and 2 September, her officers and crew qualified for the clasp "Egypt" to the Naval General Service Medal that the Admiralty authorised in 1850 for all surviving claimants. (Note: A first-class share of the prize money awarded in April 1823 was worth £34 2s 4d; a fifth-class share, that of a seaman, was worth 3s 11½d. The amount was small as the total had to be shared between 79 vessels and the entire army contingent.)

When the Treaty of Amiens was signed, bringing the war to an end in 1802, Foudroyant was paid off at Plymouth Dock (Devonport) on 26 July.

== Napoleonic Wars ==
In January 1803, Foudroyant was docked in Plymouth Dock for a somewhat major repair. The ship was recommissioned under the command of Captain Peter Spicer on 11 June. Her former captain, now Rear Admiral Sir James Richard Dacres, hoisted his flag on the same day, and remained aboard until 28 October. Two days later, Rear Admiral of the White, Sir Thomas Graves hoisted his flag. Captain Peter Puget took over the command on 27 February 1804; however, owing to a serious injury while Foudroyant served with the Channel Fleet, he was returned to England (leaving Christopher Nesham in acting command) and officially left the ship on 31 May 1805. Foudroyant returned to dock on 26 March 1804 for repairs.

24 February 1805 saw Captain Edward Kendall take over the command, and in June Foudroyant was flagship of Graves's fleet, consisting of Barfleur, Raisonnable, Repulse, Triumph, Warrior, Windsor Castle, and Egyptienne blockading the French port of Rochefort.

Command of the ship passed to Captain John Erskine Douglas on 9 December temporarily, before Captain John Chambers White assumed command on the 13th. On 13 March 1806, Foudroyant was involved in an action between some ships of the fleet and two French vessels - Marengo of 80 guns, and Belle Poule of 40. Both ships were captured and taken into the navy.

On 24 November Captain Richard Peacock took command of the ship, and Admiral Sir John Borlase Warren hoisted his flag in Foudroyant on 19 December. Rear Admiral Sir Albemarle Bertie raised his flag in Foudroyant on 20 May 1807, and remained in the ship until 17 November. Peacock's command passed to Captain Norborne Thompson on 31 May. Foudroyant joined with Admiral Sir Sir Sidney Smith's squadron blockading Lisbon. (Note: Sidney Smith's squadron was composed of Hibernia, London, Conqueror, Elizabeth, Marlborough, Monarch, and Plantagenet.) Smith hoisted his flag in Foudroyant on 24 January 1808. Captain Charles Marsh Schomberg took command of the ship on 6 June. (Note: The ship's records indicate that Captain Thompson left the ship on 3 February. The gap between him leaving the ship and Schomberg joining is not explained.) On 12 March Foudroyant parted company for South America, arriving in Rio de Janeiro in August. Captain John Davie took command on 25 January 1809, and then Captain Richard Hancock on 17 May. Smith transferred his flag to Diana on the same day.

From 25 May, Foudroyant was in company with Agamemnon, Mutine, Mistletoe, and Brilliant, escorting a convoy. On 8 June they entered Moldonado Bay at the mouth of the Río de la Plata where Agamemnon struck rocks and was wrecked. Foudroyant assisted in taking off men and stores from the stricken ship; there were no deaths.

Foudroyant remained in the Río area until August 1812, when she returned to England, entering Cawsand Bay on 21 October, and entering Plymouth Dock on 6 November. Hancock departed the ship on 30 November, and then Foudroyant lay at her anchor until 26 January 1815, when she was taken into dock for a large repair that lasted 4 years.

== Post-war ==
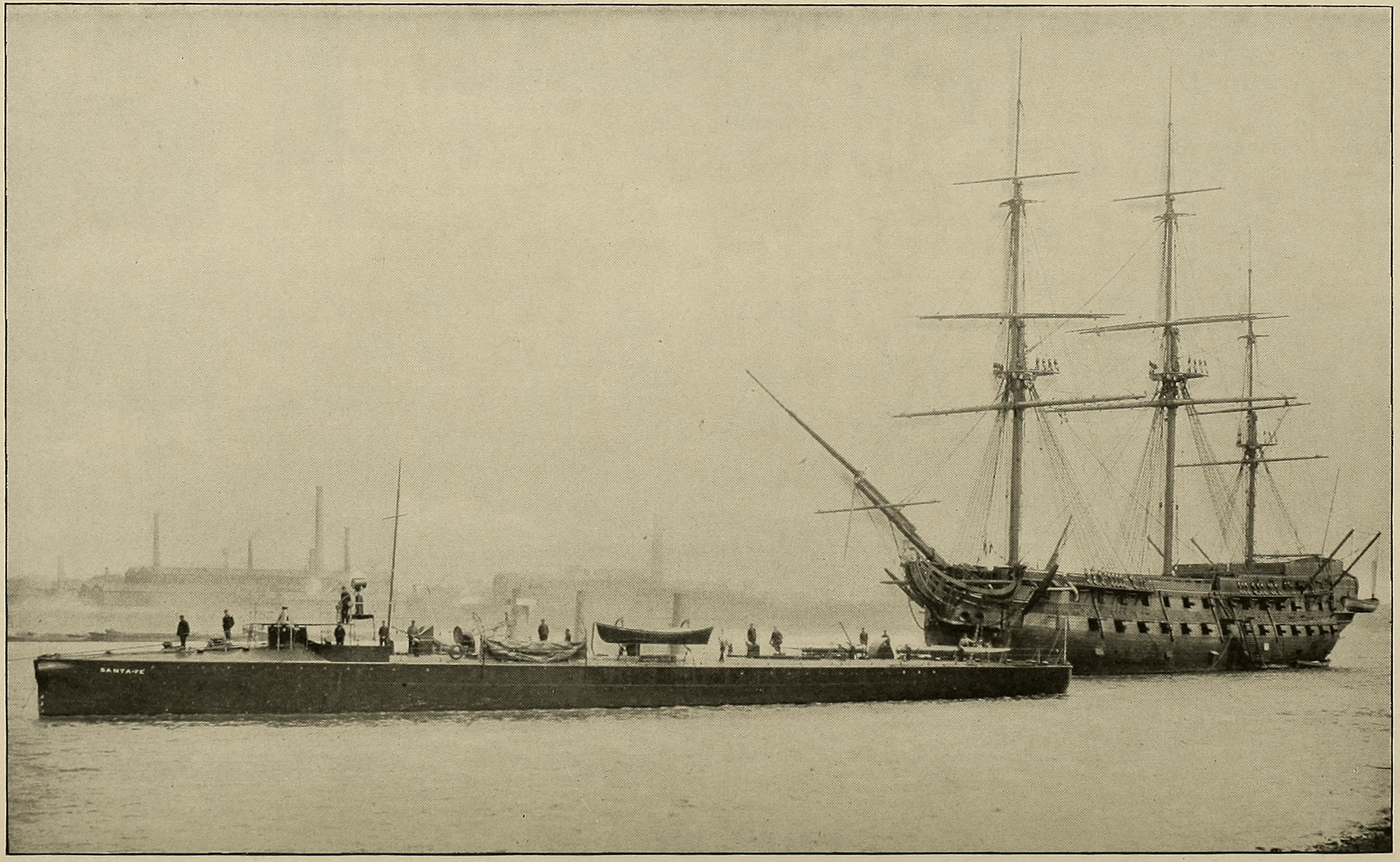
Foudroyant seen next to the Argentine torpedo boat destroyer Santa Fe - circa 1897

When Foudroyant came out of dock in 1819, she took up her role as guard ship in Plymouth Dock (renamed Devonport 1824) until about 1860. Throughout this period she was in and out of dock on several occasions for repairs. In 1862 she was converted into a gunnery training vessel, a role she fulfilled until 1884. She was thereafter stationed at Devonport on dockyard duties, and was attached as to tender to the gunnery schoolship HMS Cambridge.

She was finally placed on the Sales List in 1891 and sold out of the service the following January for £2,350. Bought by J. Read of Portsmouth, she was promptly resold to German shipbreakers. This prompted a storm of public protest. Arthur Conan Doyle published a poem called "For Nelson's Sake" which protested this sale. Philanthropist Geoffry Wheatly Cobb of Caldicot Castle then bought her to use as a training ship for boys and restored her to her original appearance at a cost of £25,000. To offset the restoration cost, it was then decided to exhibit her at various seaside resorts.

== Fate ==
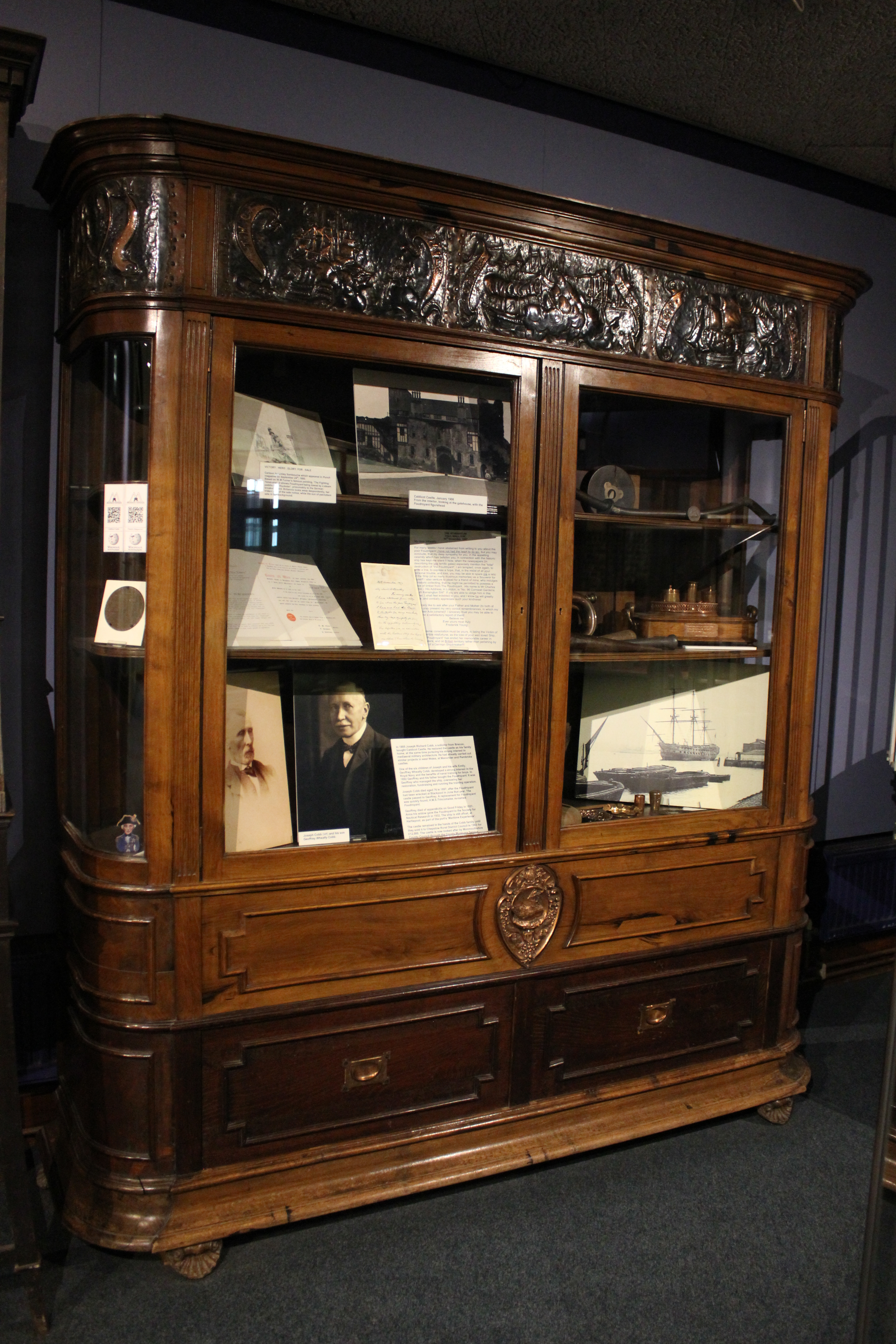
Cabinet at Monmouth Museum made of the wreckage of the Foudroyant and containing objects also made from the ship.

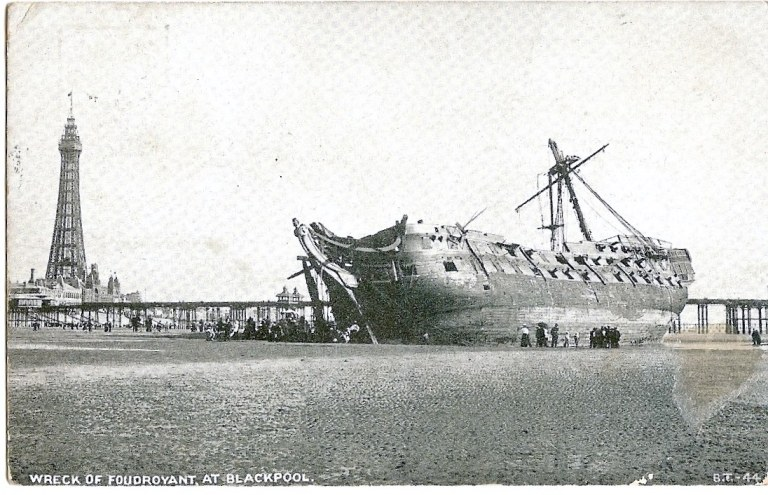
The wreck of HMS Foudroyant

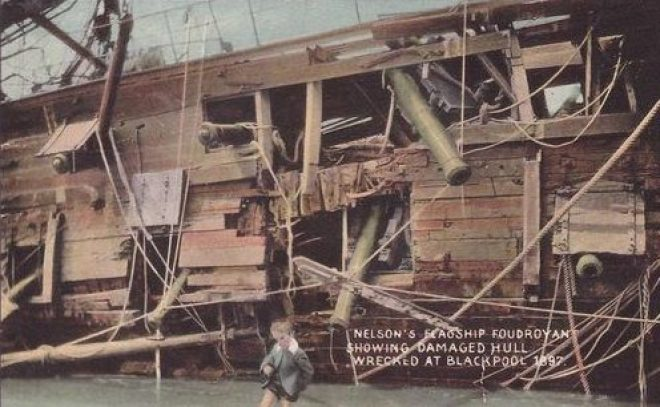
Foudroyant's damaged hull, 1897

In June 1897 she was towed to Blackpool and could be visited for a small entrance fee.

On 16 June 1897 during a violent storm, she parted a cable and dragging the remaining anchor, went ashore on Blackpool Sands, damaging Blackpool North Pier in the process. The Blackpool lifeboat was able to rescue all 27 of her crew.

After vain attempts to refloat her, her guns were removed and she was sold for £200. She finally broke up in the December gales. Craftsmen used flotsam from the wreck to make furniture, and, between 1929 and 2003, the wall panelling of the boardroom of Blackpool F.C.'s Bloomfield Road ground. The ship's bell now resides in Blackpool Town Hall. Copper, salvaged from the wreck, was used to manufacture medals, which were sold to the general public.

As a replacement, Cobb purchased the 38-gun frigate Trincomalee, and renamed her Foudroyant in the previous ship's honour. This Foudroyant remained in service until 1991, when she was taken to Hartlepool and renamed back to Trincomalee.
