= Michael de Courcy =

Royal Navy Admiral (17??–1824)

Admiral Michael de Courcy (17?? – 22 February 1824), third son of John de Courcy, 18th Baron Kingsale, was an Anglo-Irish naval officer who served in the British Royal Navy.

In March 1809 de Courcy was sent to Rio de Janeiro to take over from Rear-Admiral Sir William Sidney Smith as commander of the South America Station. Sidney Smith was not aware of his recall, and although de Courcy arrived on 2 May, it was only by 18 May that de Courcy assumed command with the help of Lord Strangford, the British Envoy Extraordinary and Minister Plenipotentiary to Portugal.
