= Gorriti Island =

Island in Uruguay

Coordinates: 34°57′09″S 54°58′18″W

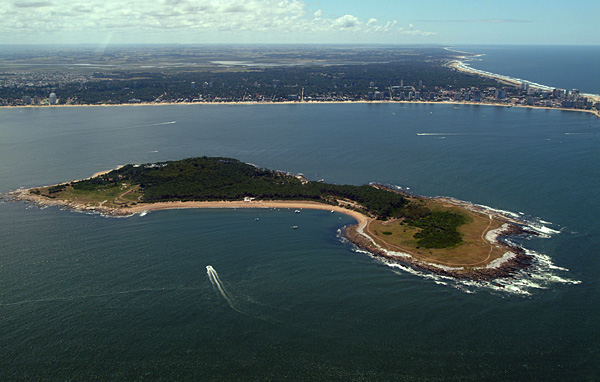
Gorriti Island, Uruguay

Gorriti Island (Spanish: Isla Gorriti) is a small island near the shores of Punta del Este, Uruguay.

== History ==
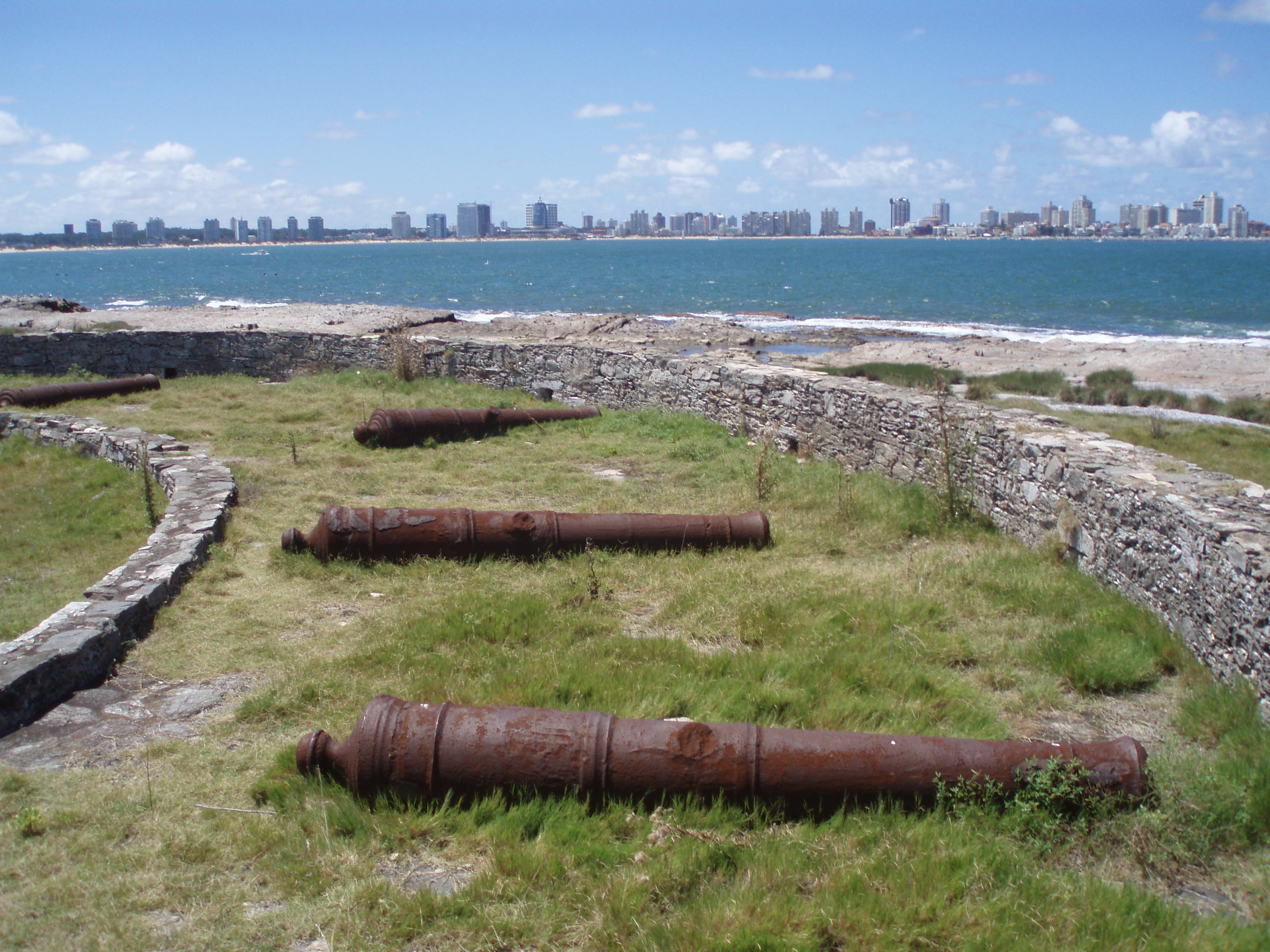
Abandoned cannons

Discovered in 1516 by Juan Díaz de Solís, it was settled from the 18th century, when in the face of Portuguese influence it was of some military significance, and abandoned cannons are still left.

Gorriti Island forms part of the Maldonado Department.

== National Heritage ==
Along with Isla de Lobos, the island has been declared to be a National Heritage, attracting tourists on beaches annually. Surrounding waters are rich in wildlife both permanently and seasonally, including southern right whales, southern elephant seals and orcas chasing tunas or South American sea lions and South American fur seals. There are breeding populations of the latter two species on Isla de Lobos.

== See also ==
- Maldonado Department § History
