= Battle of Copenhagen (1801) =

1801 battle of the War of the Second Coalition and the English Wars

- Part of the War of the Second Coalition and the English Wars
- 1806 painting of the battle
Date	2 April 1801
Location	Off Copenhagen, Øresund 55°42′10″N 12°36′48″E
Result	British victory

Belligerents
United Kingdom	Denmark–Norway

Commanders and leaders
Sir Hyde Parker; Lord Nelson	Olfert Fischer; Steen Andersen Bille

Strength
12 ships of the line; 4 frigates; 1 post ship; 2 ship-sloops; 2 brig-sloops; 7 bomb vessels; 2 fireships	7 ships of the line; 4 frigates; 3 prams; 3 radeaus; 1 floating battery

Casualties and losses
254–274 killed 688–737 wounded	367 killed 635 wounded 1,779 captured; 6 ships of the line captured; 1 ship of the line destroyed; 2 frigates captured; 1 pram captured; 2 prams sunk; 3 radeaus captured
- Location within Europe

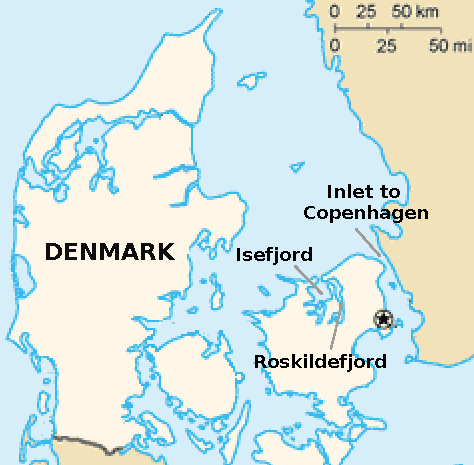
Where the Battle of Copenhagen harbour occurred in 1801, and where Roskildefjord is located. It could have been hazardous for the Royal Navy to sail into the fjord, which is very narrow

In the Battle of Copenhagen, also known as the First Battle of Copenhagen to distinguish it from the Second Battle of Copenhagen in 1807, a British naval fleet defeated a smaller force of the Royal Dano-Norwegian Navy anchored near Copenhagen on 2 April 1801. The battle came about over British fears that the powerful Danish fleet would ally with France, and a breakdown in diplomatic communications on both sides.

As the British ships entered the large harbour of the Danish Navy, several of its ships took up station at the harbour's roadstead, forming a blockade. The Danish fleet defended the capital with these ships and bastions on both sides of the harbour inlet. It was the second attempt by the British to try to prevent a Franco-Danish alliance, as the British had already entered Øresund with a fleet in August 1800, in order to persuade Denmark not to ally with France. The Danes agreed to the British terms upon hearing news of the assassination of Emperor Paul I of Russia (Died March 23–24, 1801), as his death meant the end of the Russian-led League of Armed Neutrality of which Denmark was a member.

== Background ==
The battle was the result of multiple failures of diplomacy in the latter half of the 18th century. At the beginning of 1801, during the French Revolutionary Wars, Britain's principal advantage over France was its naval superiority. The Royal Navy searched neutral ships trading with French ports, seizing their cargoes if they were deemed to be trading with France. It was in the British interest to guarantee its naval supremacy and all trade advantages that resulted from it. The Russian tsar, Paul, having been a British ally, arranged a League of Armed Neutrality comprising Denmark, Sweden, Prussia, and Russia, to enforce free trade with France. The British viewed the League to be very much in the French interest and a serious threat. The league was hostile to the British blockade and, according to the British, its existence threatened the supply of timber and naval stores from Scandinavia.

In early 1801, the British government assembled a fleet off Great Yarmouth at Yarmouth Roads, with the goal of breaking up the league. The British needed to act before the Baltic Sea thawed and released the Russian fleet from its bases at Kronstadt and Reval (now Tallinn). If the Russian fleet joined with the Swedish and Danish fleets, the combined fleets would form a formidable force of up to 123 ships of the line. The British fleet was under the command of Admiral of the White Sir Hyde Parker, with Vice-Admiral of the Blue Horatio Nelson, 1st Baron Nelson as his second-in-command.

Frustrated by the delay, Nelson sent a letter to Captain Thomas Troubridge, a friend and a Lord Commissioner of the Admiralty. This prompted the Lord St Vincent (First Lord of the Admiralty) to send a private note, which resulted in the fleet sailing from Yarmouth on 12 March. Orders were sent to Parker to go to Copenhagen and detach Denmark from the league by "amicable arrangement or by actual hostilities", to be followed by "an immediate and vigorous attack" on the Russians at Reval and then Kronstadt. The British fleet reached the Skaw (Danish: Skagen) on 19 March, where they met a British diplomat, Nicholas Vansittart, who told them that the Danes had rejected an ultimatum.

Nelson Forcing the Passage of the Sound, 30 March 1801

Although the British Admiralty had instructed Parker to frustrate the league, by force if necessary, he was a naturally cautious person and moved slowly. He wanted to blockade the Baltic despite the danger of the combination of fleets; Nelson wanted to ignore Denmark and Sweden, who were both reluctant partners in the alliance, and instead sail to the Baltic to fight the Russians. In the end Nelson was able to persuade Sir Hyde to attack the Danish fleet currently concentrated off Copenhagen. Promised naval support for the Danes from Karlskrona, in Sweden, did not arrive, perhaps because of adverse winds. The Prussians had only minimal naval forces and also could not assist. On 30 March, the British force passed through the narrows between Denmark and Sweden, sailing close to the Swedish coast to put themselves as far from the Danish guns as possible; fortunately for the British, the Swedish batteries remained silent.

Attacking the Danish fleet would have been difficult as Parker's delay in sailing had allowed the Danes to prepare their positions well. Most of the Danish ships were not fitted for sea but were moored along the shore with old ships (hulks), no longer fit for service at sea, but still powerfully armed, as a line of floating batteries off the eastern coast of the island of Amager, in front of the city in the King's Channel. The northern end of the line terminated at the Tre Kroner forts armed with 68 guns (equal to twice the broadside of a typical ship-of-the-line). North of the fort, in the entrance to Copenhagen harbour, were two ships of the line, a large frigate, and two brigs, all rigged for sea, and two more hulks. Batteries covered the water between the Danish line and the shore, and further out to sea a large shoal, the Middle Ground, constricted the channel. The British had no reliable charts or pilots, so Captain Thomas Hardy spent most of the night of 31 March taking soundings in the channel up to the Danish line. Even so, the British ships were not able to locate the deepest part of the channel properly and so kept too far to seaward.

== Battle ==
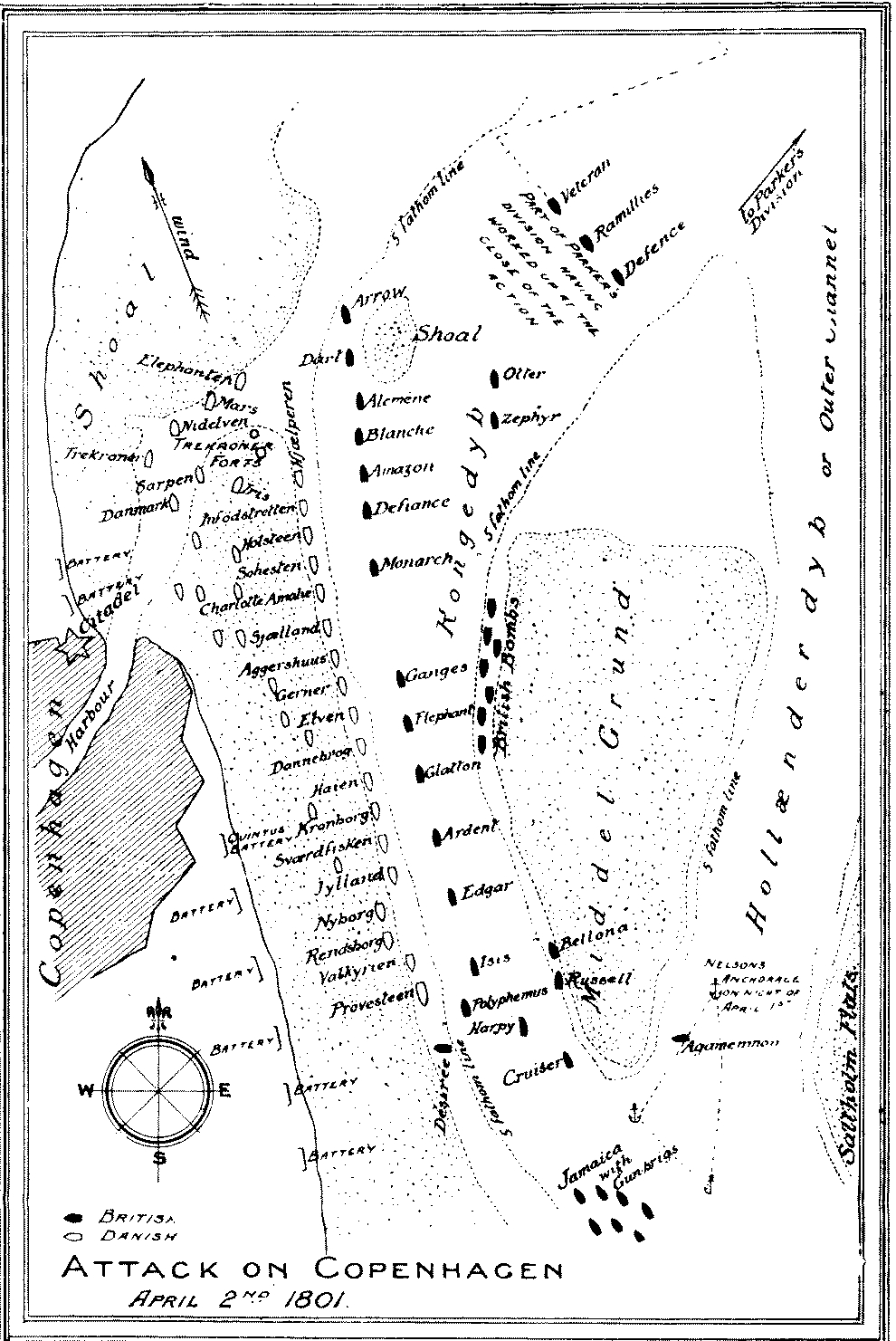
Sketch of the battle

=== Preparations ===
Parker gave Nelson the twelve ships of the line with the shallowest drafts, and all the smaller ships in the fleet. Parker himself stayed to the north-east of the battle with the heavier ships – whose deeper drafts did not allow them to safely enter the channel – screening Nelson from possible external interference and moving towards Copenhagen to engage the northern defences. (Note: William Bligh, of Bounty fame, commanded Glatton, one of Nelson's ships.) Nelson transferred his command from the large 98-gun HMS St George to the shallower-draft 74-gun HMS Elephant for this reason.

On 30 March, Nelson, and his second-in-command, Rear-Admiral of the White Thomas Graves, accompanied by Captain William Domett and the commanding officer of the troops, Lieutenant-colonel William Stewart, sailed in the hired lugger Lark to reconnoitre the Danish defences at Copenhagen. They found the defences to be strong and so spent the evening discussing the plan. Fixed batteries had a significant advantage over ship borne cannon owing to their greater stability and larger guns, and the Danes could reinforce their ships during the battle. (Note: Danish reinforcement included the replacement of a captain at one point.) On the other hand, their ships were a motley collection, many of them small, and out-gunned if engaged by the whole of Nelson's force.

Contemporary map of the battle

Nelson's plan was for the British ships to approach the weaker, southern end of the Danish defences in a line parallel to the Danish one. As the foremost ship drew alongside a Danish ship, it would anchor and engage that ship. The remainder of the line would pass outside the engagement until the next British ship drew alongside the next Danish ship, and so on. The frigate HMS Desirée, together with small gun-brigs, would rake the Danish line from the south, and a force of frigates, commanded by Captain Edward Riou of HMS Amazon, would attack the northern end of the line. Troops would land and assault the Tre Kroner fortress once the fleet had subdued the Danish line of ships. Bomb vessels would sit outside the British line and bombard the Danes by firing over it. Should the British be unable to subdue the stronger, northern defences, the destruction of the southern ships would be enough to allow the bomb vessels to approach within range of the city and force negotiations to prevent the bombardment of the city.

=== Action ===
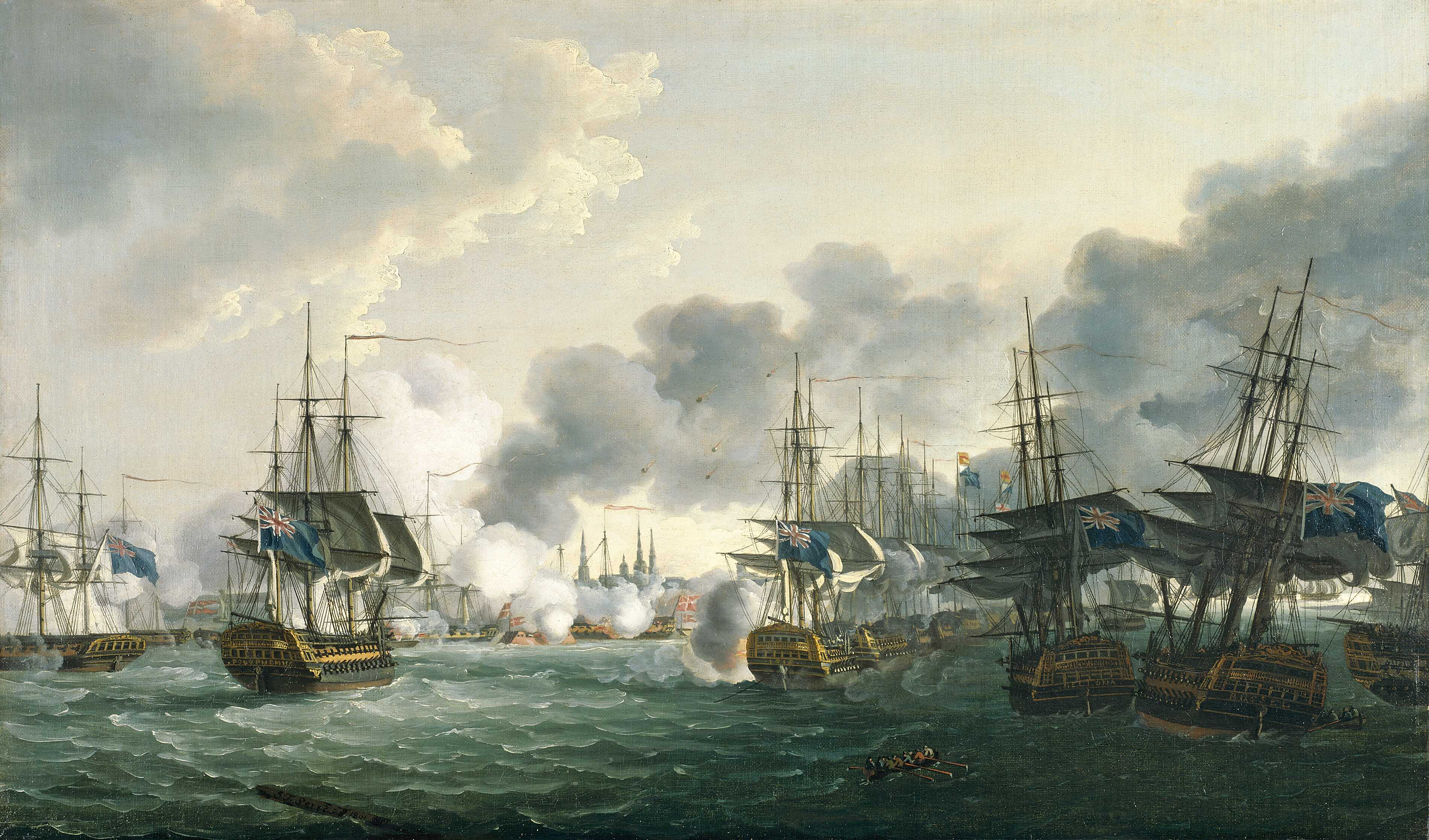
The picture is viewed from the south end of the King's Deep and shows the British fleet flying the blue ensign. In the right foreground the Russell and Bellona are shown in port-quarter view, their sharply pitched position indicating that they have gone aground.

With a southerly wind on 2 April, Nelson picked his way through the shoals. However, HMS Agamemnon ran aground before entering the channel, and took no part in the battle. Then HMS Russell and HMS Bellona ran aground on the Middle Ground, severely restricting their role in the battle. The loss of the three vessels required hurried changes in the line and weakened the force's northern end.

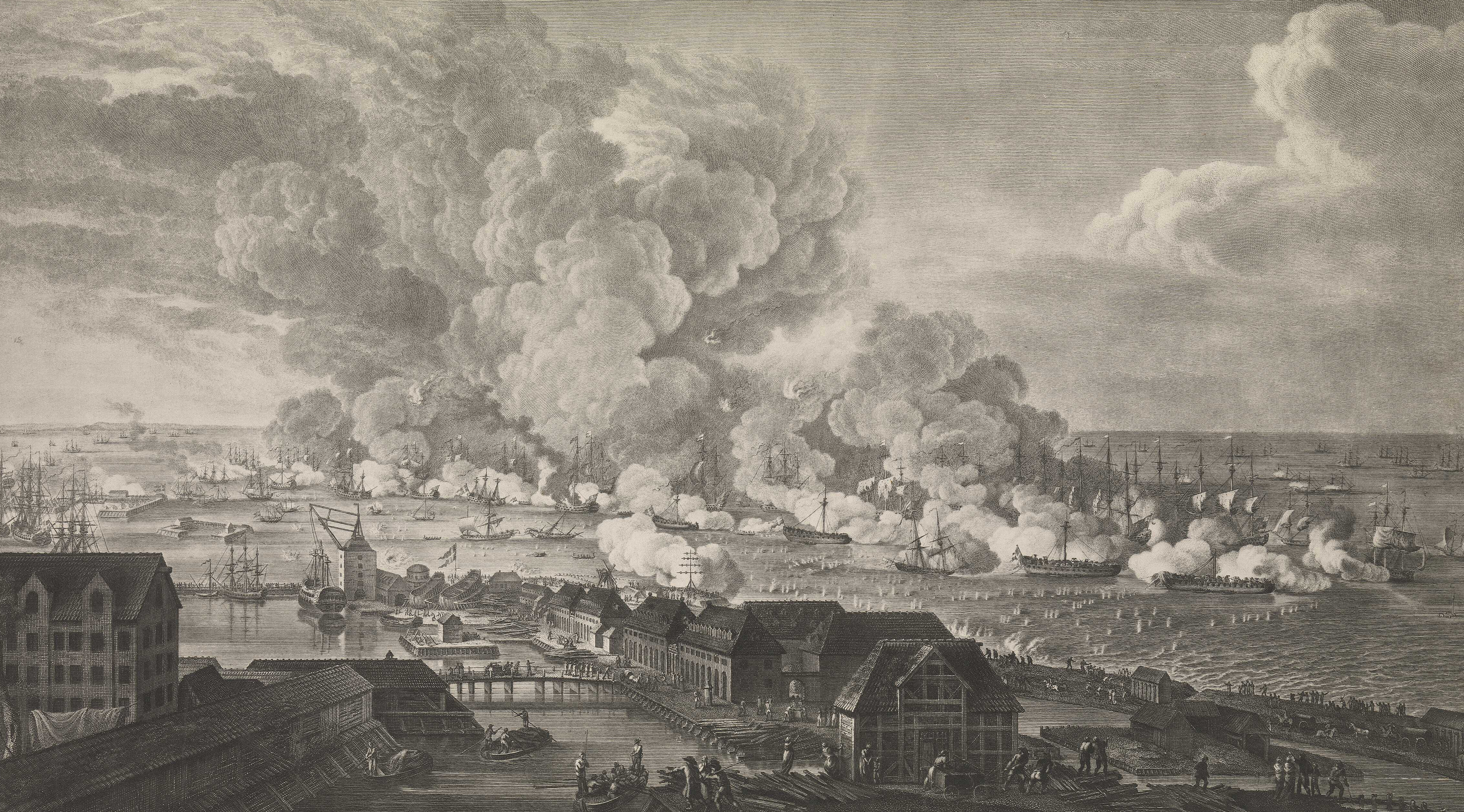
The battle viewed from Copenhagen, around noon, with the Danish floating batteries moored between the attacking British line and the city

The Danish batteries started firing at 10:05 am, the first half of the British fleet was engaged in about half an hour, and the battle was general by 11:30 am. Once the British line was in place there was very little manoeuvring. The British ships anchored by the stern about a cable from the line of Danish ships and batteries, which was relatively long range, and the two exchanged broadsides until a ship ceased firing. The British encountered heavy resistance, partly because they had not spotted the low-lying floating batteries, and partly because of the courage with which the Danes fought. The northern Danish ships, which were rigged and manned, did not enter the battle but remained on station as reserve units, even though the wind direction forced Parker's squadron to approach only slowly.

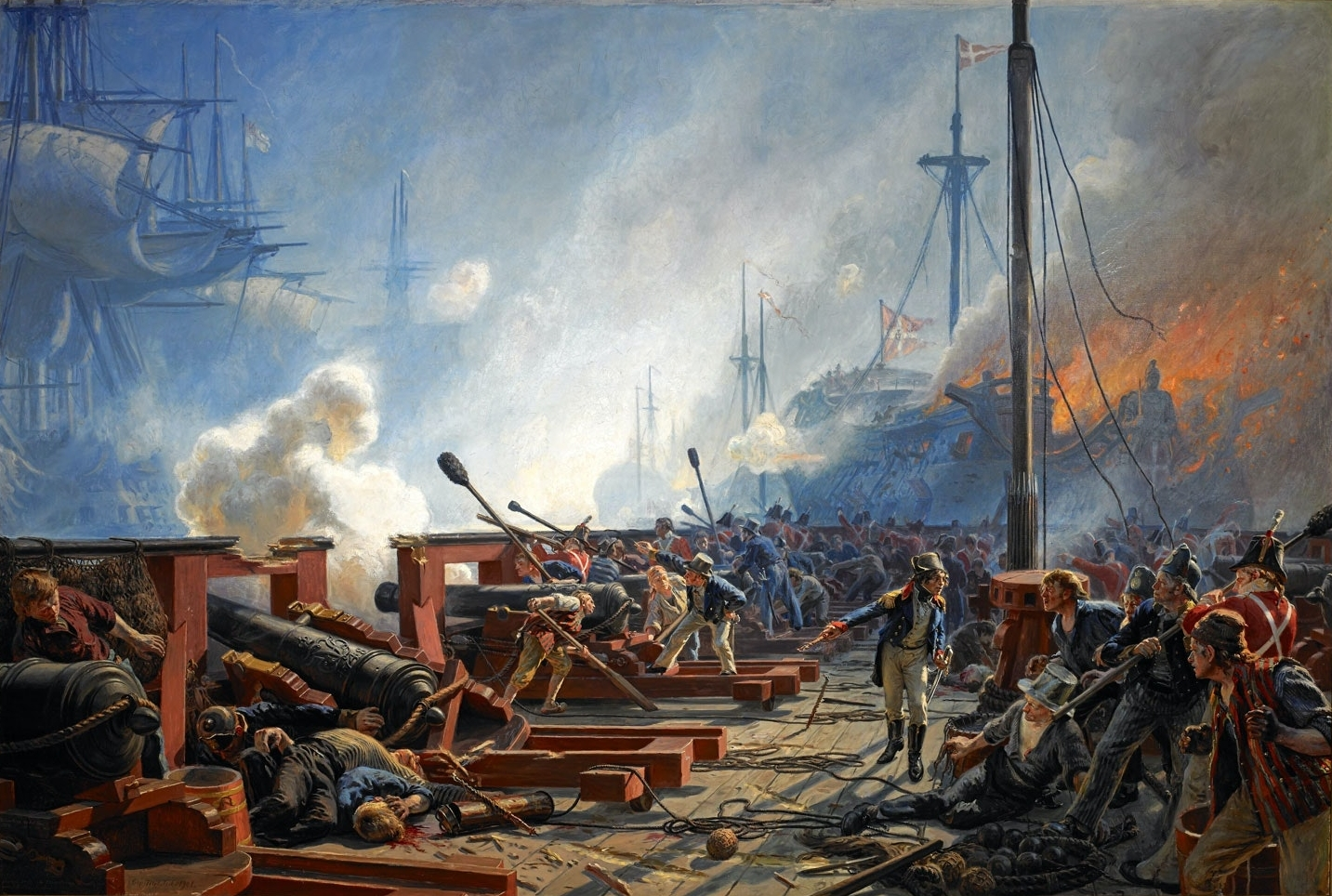
The Battle of Copenhagen. Painting by Christian Mølsted. (view from a floating battery)

At 1:00 pm, the battle was still in full swing. Prøvesteenen's heavier fire would have destroyed HMS Isis if it had not been raked by Desirée, assisted by HMS Polyphemus. HMS Monarch suffered badly from the combined fires of Holsteen and Sjælland. (Note: A midshipman sent to the magazine on an errand said "When I arrived on the maindeck, along which I had to pass, there was not a single man standing the whole way from the main mast forward, a district containing eight guns, some of which were run out ready for firing; others lay dismounted; the others remained as they were after recoiling... I hastened down the fore ladder to the lower deck and felt really relieved to find someone alive." Pocock, p. 236)

=== Signal to retreat ===
Parker's view of the battle was heavily obscured by gun smoke, but he could see the signals on the three grounded British ships, with Bellona and Russell flying signals of distress and Agamemnon a signal of inability to proceed. Thinking that Nelson might have fought to a stand-still but might be unable to retreat without orders (the Articles of War demanded that all ranks "do their utmost" against the enemy in battle), at 1:30 pm Parker told his flag captain:

I will make the signal of recall for Nelson's sake. If he is in condition to continue the action, he will disregard it; if he is not, it will be an excuse for his retreat and no blame can be imputed to him.

Nelson ordered that the signal be acknowledged, but not repeated. He turned to his flag captain, Thomas Foley, and said "You know, Foley, I only have one eye – I have the right to be blind sometimes," and then, holding his telescope to his blind eye, said "I really do not see the signal!" Rear Graves repeated the signal, but in a place invisible to most other ships while keeping Nelson's "close action" signal at his masthead. Of Nelson's captains, only Riou, who could not see Nelson's flagship Elephant, followed Parker's signal. Riou withdrew his force, which was then attacking the Tre Kroner fortress, exposing himself to heavy fire, which resulted in his death and the deaths of several crew members onboard Amazon.

=== End of the battle ===
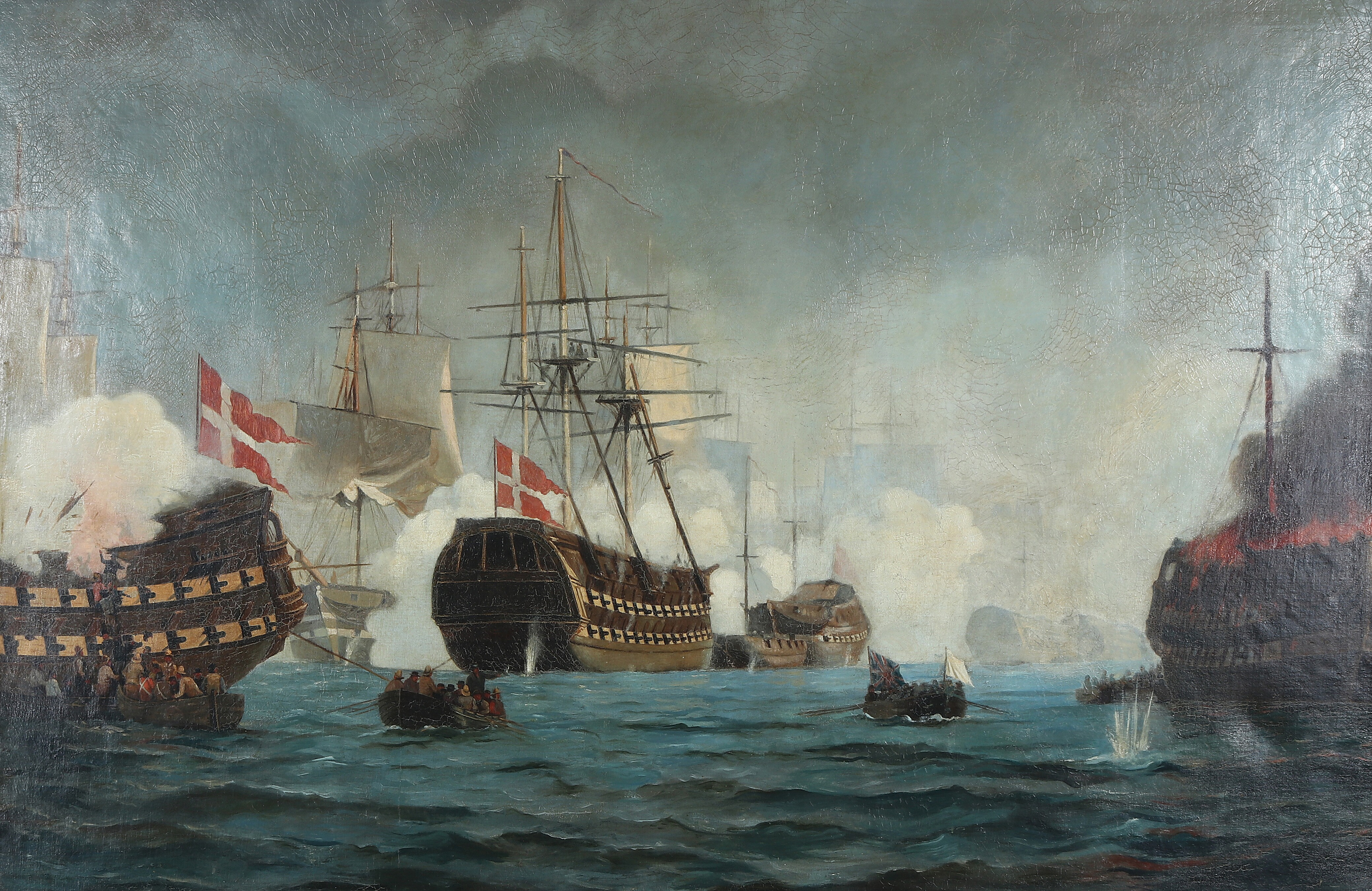
The Battle of Copenhagen by Christian Mølsted. It shows a situation in the battle where Admiral Nelson sends a message – the small boat carrying Union Jack and a white flag – to the Danish side.

It was at this time that the battle swung decisively to the British, as their superior gunnery took effect. The guns of the dozen southernmost Danish ships had started to fall silent owing to the damage they had sustained, and the fighting moved northward. According to British eyewitness accounts, much of the Danish line had fallen silent by 2:00 pm. (Note: Some Danish historians contest the timing, stating that the entire Dano–Norwegian line continued to resist until 2:30 pm.) The cessation of firing left the way open for the British bomb vessels to approach Copenhagen. In addition, the reinforcements of the ships from the shore batteries were causing the latter to become ineffective.

Nyborg tried to leave the line with Aggershuus in tow, but both sank. The most northerly ship, the frigate Hjælperen, successfully withdrew. The Danish commander, Commodore Olfert Fischer, moved from Dannebroge at 11:30 am, when it caught fire, to Holsteen. When Indfødsretten, immediately north of Holsteen, struck its colours at about 2:30 pm, he moved on to the Tre Kroner fortress. There he engaged three of Parker's ships, which had lost their manoeuvrability after being badly damaged and had drifted within range. Indfødsretten resumed firing after Captain Schrodersee was ferried to it and took command of the ship. (Note: Schrodersee fell during the battle, and the Crown Prince honoured his sacrifice by later erecting a "broken shipmast" at the spot where Schrodersee was ordered to take command of Indfødsretten.)

Perhaps because of inexperienced crews, several Danish ships fired on British boats sent out to them after their officers had signalled their surrender. Nelson said that he "must either send on shore and stop this irregular proceeding, or send in our fire ships and burn them" and went to his cabin to write a note to the Danes. He sent it with a Danish-speaking officer, Captain Sir Frederick Thesiger, under a flag of truce to the Dano–Norwegian regent, Crown Prince Frederik, who had been watching the battle from the ramparts of the Citadel. The note read:

To the Brothers of Englishmen, the Danes
Lord Nelson has directions to spare Denmark when she is no longer resisting, but if firing is continued on the part of Denmark, Lord Nelson will be obliged to set on fire the floating batteries he has taken, without having the power of saving the brave Danes who have defended them.

— Nelson,

All action ceased when Crown Prince Frederick sent his Adjutant General, Hans Lindholm (a Danish member of parliament), asking for the reason for Nelson's letter. When he could not clearly communicate verbally, Lindholm was asked to put his message in written English, which he did, but being given a dull quill, he joked:

If your guns are not better pointed than your pens, then you will make little impression on Copenhagen.

— Hans Lindholm,

In reply, Nelson wrote a note:

Lord Nelson's object in sending the Flag of Truce was humanity; he therefore consents that hostilities shall cease, and that the wounded Danes may be taken on shore. And Lord Nelson will take his prisoners out of the Vessels, and burn and carry off his prizes as he shall see fit.

Lord Nelson, with humble duty to His Royal Highness the Prince of Denmark, will consider this the greatest victory he has ever gained, if it may be the cause of a happy reconciliation and union between his own most gracious Sovereign, and His Majesty the King of Denmark.

— Nelson,

which was sent back to the Crown Prince. He then referred Lindholm to Parker on HMS London. Following him there at 4:00 pm, a twenty-four-hour ceasefire was agreed.

== Aftermath ==
After fighting had ended, the Danish flagship Dannebroge exploded at 4:30 pm, killing 250 men. By the end of the afternoon, three more badly damaged British ships ran aground, including Elephant. Fischer's ships had been partly manned by volunteers, many having little or no naval experience, and as they were not all listed after the battle, it is uncertain what the exact Dano–Norwegian losses were. The official report Fischer submitted after the battle estimated that the Dano-Norwegian casualties were at least 1,600–1,800 killed or wounded. A work published by the Royal Danish Naval Museum in 1994 claimed that the Dano-Norwegian casualties amounted to 367 killed, 635 wounded (100 of whom died in the days that followed) and 1,779 captured. According to the official returns recorded by each British ship, and repeated in dispatches from Nelson and forwarded by Parker to the Admiralty, British casualties were 274 killed and 737 wounded. 20 of the dead were officers while the remaining 254 were enlisted personnel, and of the British wounded 48 were officers while the other 689 were enlisted.

Of the 18 Danish ships engaged in the battle, two had sunk, one had exploded and 12 had been captured. The British could not spare men for manning their prizes due to the possibility of future engagements. They burned eleven of the captured ships, and only one, Holsteen, was sailed to England with the wounded under surgeon William Fergusson. Holsteen was then taken into service with the Royal Navy and renamed HMS Holstein (later HMS Nassau).

=== Subsequent events ===
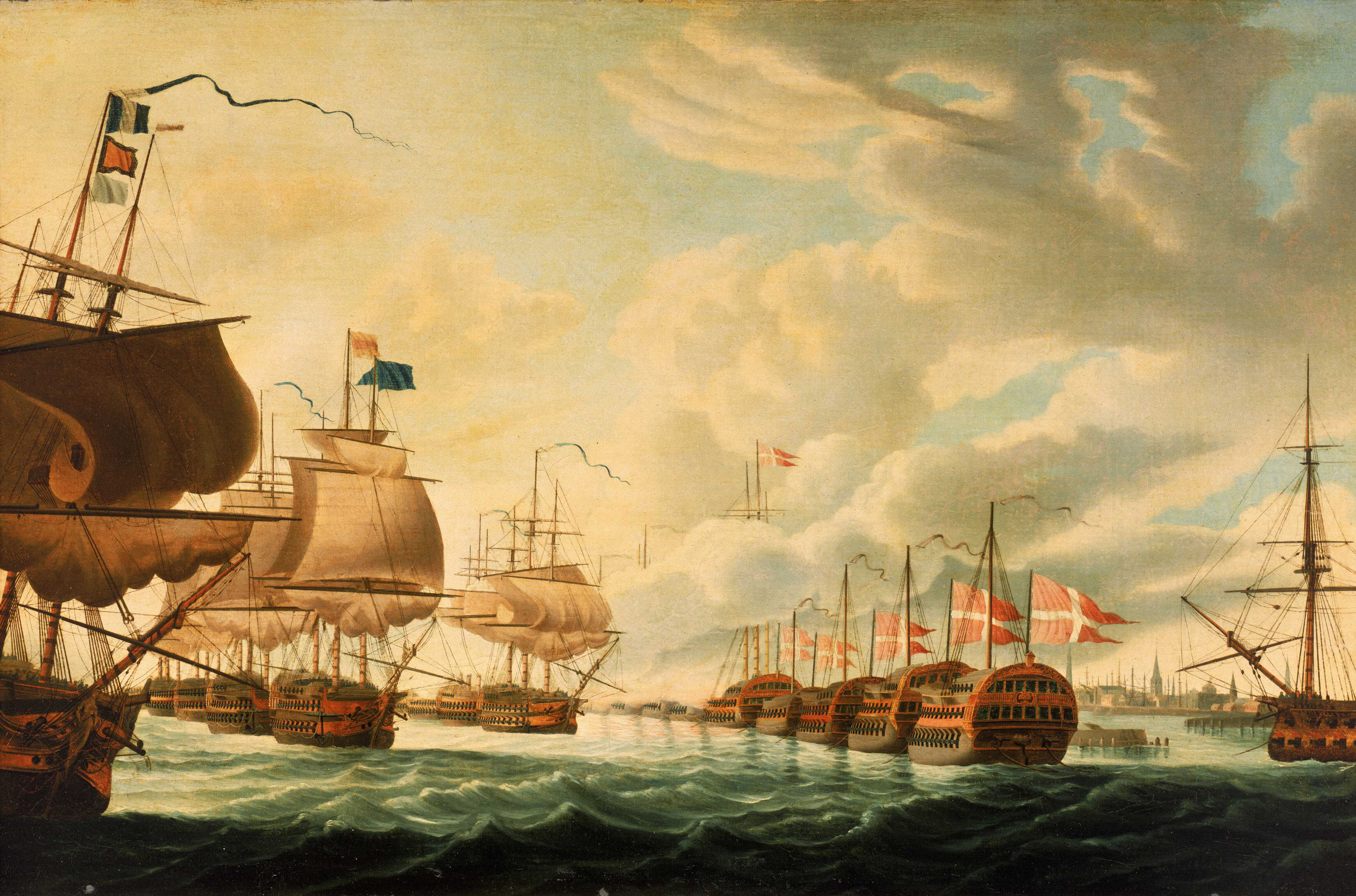
Painting of the battle by Robert Dodd. The sail-less Danish ships at right are being deployed as floating batteries.

The next day, Nelson landed in Copenhagen to open negotiations. Stewart reported that "the population showed an admixture of admiration, curiosity and displeasure". In a two-hour meeting with the Crown Prince (who spoke English), Nelson was able to secure an indefinite armistice. He then tried to convince first Fischer (whom he had known in the West Indies), and then the Prince, of British protection against the Russians. Negotiations continued by letter and on 8 April Nelson returned in person with a formal agreement.

The one sticking point out of the seven articles was a sixteen-week armistice to allow action against the Russians. At this point Stewart claims that one of the Danes turned to another and said in French that disagreement might lead to a renewal of hostilities. "Renew hostilities!" responded Nelson, and turning to his interpreter said "Tell him that we are ready in a moment; ready to bombard this very night!" Hurried apologies followed (the British fleet now occupied positions that would allow the bombardment of Copenhagen) and agreement was reached and signed the next day. The armistice was reduced to fourteen weeks, but during it armed neutrality would be suspended and the British were to have free access to Copenhagen. Danish prisoners were also paroled. In the final hour of negotiations, the Danes found out (but not the British) that Tsar Paul had been assassinated. This resulted in the dissolution of the League of Armed Neutrality and allowed the Danes to accept British terms. The final peace agreement was then signed on 23 October 1801.

On 12 April, Parker sailed to Karlskrona and on the British approach, the Swedish fleet returned to the port where Parker attempted to persuade them to also leave the League. Parker refused to sail into the eastern Baltic and instead returned to Copenhagen, where he found that news of his lack of vigour had reached London. On 5 May, he was recalled and ordered to hand his command over to Nelson. Nelson sailed eastwards again and, leaving six ships of the line at Karlskrona, he arrived at Reval on 14 May to find that the ice had melted and the Russian fleet had departed for Kronstadt. He also found out that negotiations for ending the armed neutrality had started and so withdrew on 17 May. As a result of the battle, Nelson was made Viscount Nelson of the Nile in the peerage of the United Kingdom.

This was not the end of the Dano-Norwegian conflict with the British. In 1807, similar circumstances led to another British attack, in the Battle of Copenhagen.

== Ships involved ==
=== United Kingdom ===
Nelson's squadron

- Polyphemus 64 (Captain John Lawford)
- Isis 50 (Captain James Walker)
- Edgar 74 (Captain George Murray)
- Ardent 64 (Captain Thomas Bertie)
- Glatton 54/56 (Captain William Bligh)
- Elephant 74 (flag of Vice-Admiral of the Blue Sir Horatio Nelson, Captain Thomas Foley)
- Ganges 74 (Captain Thomas Francis Fremantle)
- Monarch 74 (Captain James Robert Mosse † and thereafter Lt. John Yelland)
- Defiance 74 (2nd flag of Rear-Admiral of the White Thomas Graves, Captain Richard Retalick)
- Russell 74 (Captain William Cuming)
- Bellona 74 (Captain Thomas Thompson)
- Agamemnon 64 (Captain Robert Devereux Fancourt)
- Désirée 36 (Captain Henry Inman)
- Amazon 38 (Captain Edward Riou †)
- Blanche 36 (Captain Graham Eden Hamond)
- Alcmene 32 (Captain Samuel Sutton)
- Jamaica 24 (Captain Jonas Rose)
- Arrow (ship-sloop, Captain Thomas Brodie)
- Dart (ship-sloop, Captain John Ferris Devonshire)
- Cruizer (brig-sloop, Cmdr. James Brisbane)
- Harpy (brig-sloop, Cmdr. William Birchall)
- Discovery (bomb, Cmdr. John Conn)
- Explosion (bomb, Cmdr. John Henry Martin)
- Hecla (bomb, Cmdr. Richard Hatherill)
- Sulphur (bomb, Cmdr. Hender Whitter)
- Terror (bomb, Cmdr. Samuel Campbell Rowley)
- Volcano (bomb, Cmdr. James Watson)
- Zebra (bomb, Cmdr. Edward Sneyd Clay)
- Otter (fireship, Cmdr. George M'Kinley)
- Zephyr (fireship, Cmdr. Clotworthy Upton)

Parker's reserve

- London 98 (flag of Admiral of the White Sir Hyde Parker, with Captain William Domett and Captain Robert Otway)
- St George 98 (Captain Thomas Masterman Hardy)
- Warrior 74 Captain Charles Tyler
- Defence 74 (Captain Henry Paulet)
- Saturn 74 (Captain Robert Lambert)
- Ramillies 74 (Captain James William Taylor Dixon)
- Raisonnable 64 (Captain John Dilkes)
- Veteran 64 (Captain Archibald Collingwood Dickson)

=== Denmark–Norway ===
Fischer's division in the King's Deep (order south–north. Only Sjælland and Holsteen were in good condition, also note the age of the ships.) These seven were listed by Nelson on 2 May 1801 with his numbering of actual gun ports in bold:

- Prøvesteenen 52/56 **30/32** (3-decker battleship, rebuilt as a two-deck defensionsskib ('defense-ship'), Kaptain L. F. Lassen
- Wagrien 48/52 **26/28** (2-decker ship of the line, 1775, later cut down in size), Kaptajn F.C. Risbrich
- Jylland 48/54 **26/28** (Originally 70 gun 2-decker ship of the line, 1760, later cut down in size), Kaptajn E.O. Branth
- Dannebroge 64 **26/28** (flag, 2-decker ship of the line, 1772), Kaptajn F.A. Bruun
- Sjælland 74 **30/32** (2-decker ship of the line, 1776), Kaptajn F.C.L. Harboe
- Holsteen 64 **26/28** (ship of the line, 1772), Kaptajn J. Arenfelt
- Indfødsretten 64 **26/28** (2-decker ship of the line, 1786), Kaptajn A. de Turah

Others:

- Rendsborg 20 (pram), Kaptajnløjtnant C.T. Egede
- Nyborg 20 (pram) Kaptajnløjtnant C.A. Rothe
- Sværdfisken 18/20 (radeau, 1764), Sekondløjtnant S.S. Sommerfeldt
- Kronborg 22 (frigate, 1779), Premierløjtnant J.E. Hauch
- Hajen 18/20 (radeau, 1793), Sekondløjtnant Jochum Nicolay Müller|J.N. Müller
- Elven 10 (frigate, 1800), Kaptajnløjtnant H. Holsten
- Flådebatteri No. 1 20 (Grenier's float/Floating Battery No. 1 1787), Søløjtnant Peter Willemoes
- Aggershus 20 (Defensionsfartøj 'defence vessel') 1786), Premierløjtnant T. Fassing
- Charlotte Amalia 26 (Old Danish East Indiaman), Kaptajn H.H. Kofoed
- Søehesten 18 (radeau 1795), Premierløjtnant B.U. Middelboe
- Hielperen 16 (Defensionsfregat 'defence frigate'), Premierløjtnant P.C. Lilienskiold

Fischer's division in the Inner Run (These ships did not see action)

- Elephanten 70
- Mars 74
- Sarpen 18-gun brig
- Nidelven 18-gun brig
- Danmark 74
- Trekroner 74 (not to be confused with Tre Kroner fortress)

All those listed in the Inner Run, apart from Elephanten which was decommissioned later in 1801 and apparently used as a storeship, were captured by the British at the later Battle of Copenhagen (1807)

Fortifications

- Sea battery TreKroner – 68 guns
- Sea Battery Lynetten – unknown number of guns
- Land battery Sixtus – unknown number of guns
- Land battery Quintus – unknown number of guns
- Fortress Kastellet – unknown number of guns

Steen Bille's division (These ships did not see action, the list is incomplete. Around 14 modern ships of the line and the same number of smaller ships were kept in the harbour.)

- Iris 40
- Nykøbing
- Aalborg
- Christiansund
- Arendal
- Langesund
- Odense
- Flensborg
- Stege
- Staværn
- Viborg
- Naskau

== Archaeological finds ==
In 2026, maritime archaeologists from the Danish Viking Ship Museum discovered the wreck of the Dannebroge after 225 years at a depth of around 15 meters. The wreck remained buried beneath layers of silt for over two centuries before being identified during surveys linked to the construction of the Lynetteholm artificial island. Artefacts such as cannonballs and structural remains, along with possible human remains, provide archaeological evidence of the battle.

== Legacy ==
The death of Tsar Paul of Russia changed the diplomatic scene and reduced the political importance of the battle, and material losses in the battle were of little importance to the fighting strength of either navy (the Danish side had taken great care to spare its first-class ships), it did however demonstrate that British determination to ensure continued naval superiority in the war against France was supreme.

== Cultural references ==
- Mister Christian by William Kinsolving, 1996. In this novel Fletcher Christian returns from the South Seas and participates in the battle, crossing paths again with William Bligh.
- The Hope by Frederik Magle, 2001. A musical work commissioned by the Admiral Danish Fleet for the 200th anniversary of the battle.
- The Inshore Squadron, book 15 of the Bolitho novels by Alexander Kent, 1978. The build up to and fighting of the battle forms the setting for this story. As Bolitho must navigate the failing diplomacy with Denmark and lead the squadron sailing under his new flag

== Gallery ==
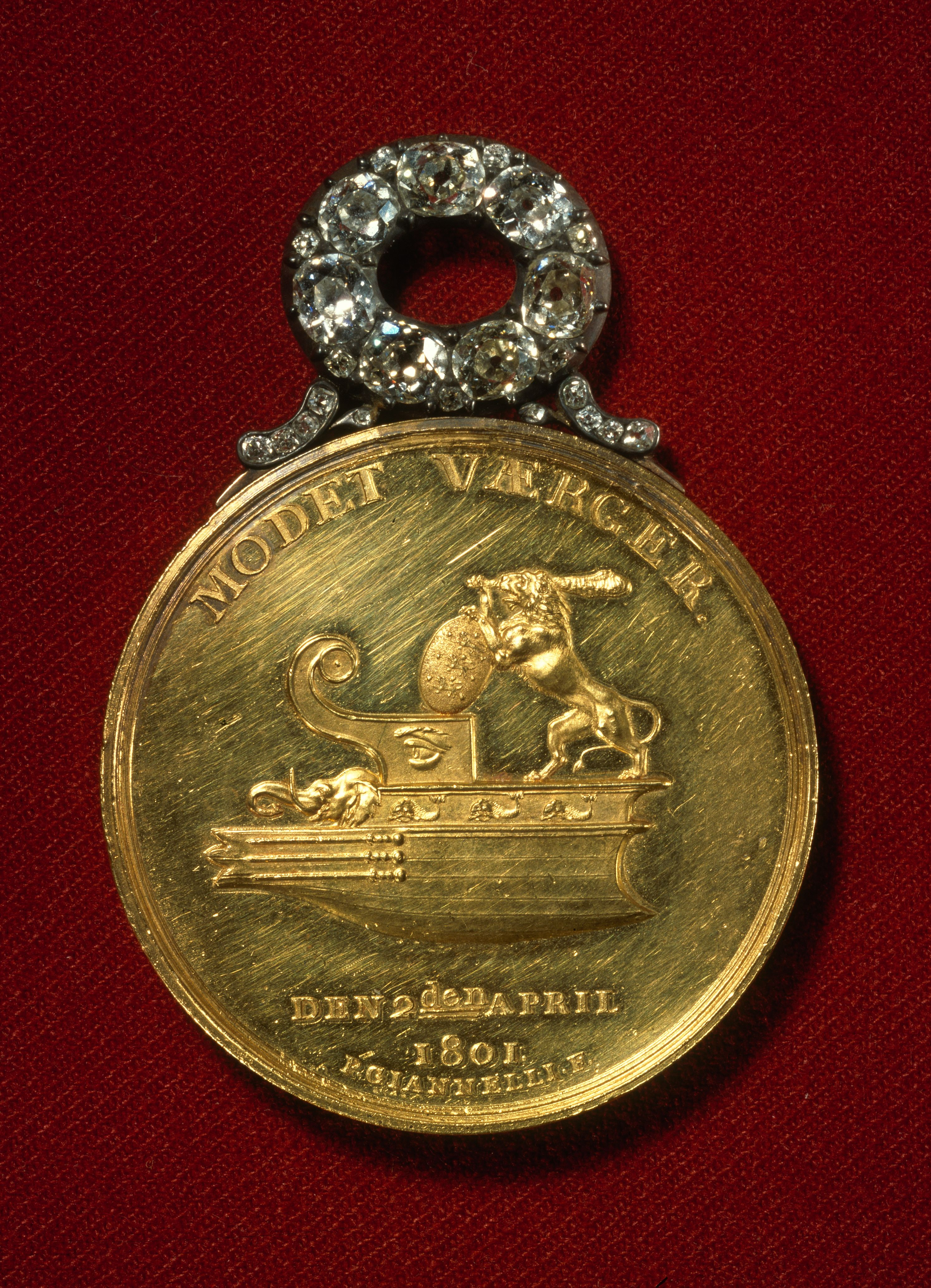
Medal

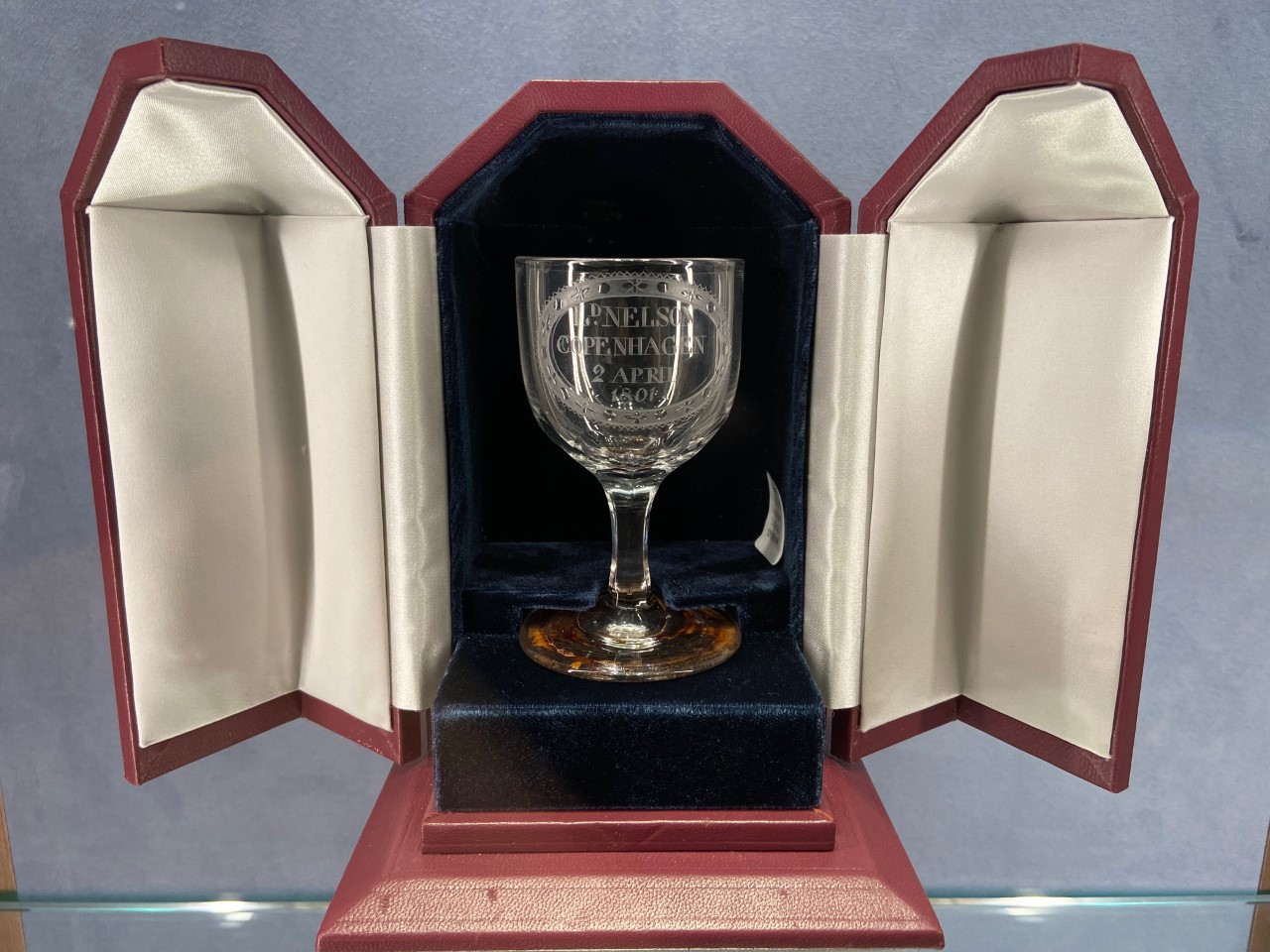
Battle of Copenhagen commemorative glass

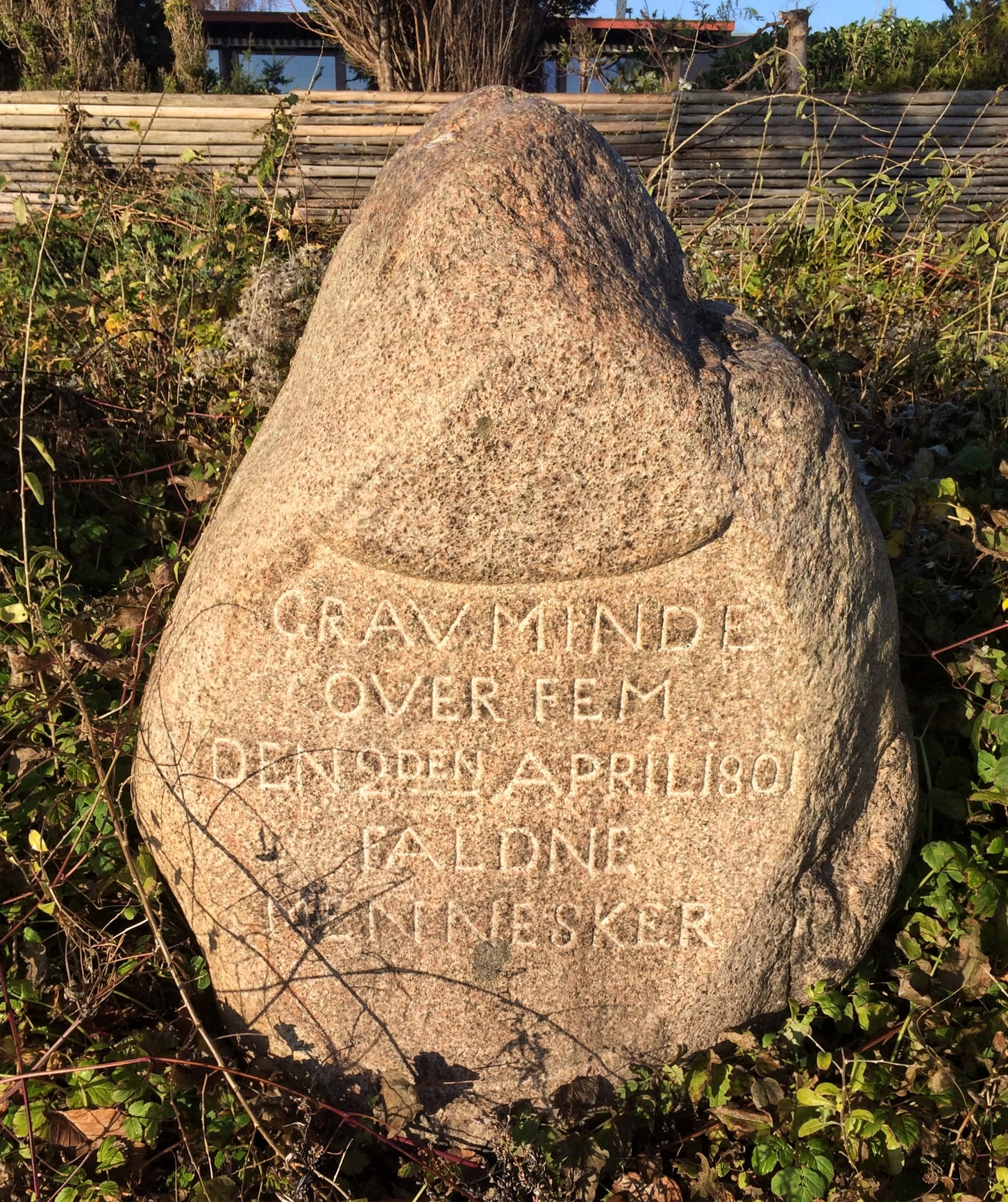
Memorial stone just north of Copenhagen

== See also ==
- List of Danish ships captured at Battle of Copenhagen
- Bibliography of 18th-19th century Royal Naval history

== Sources ==
- Winfield, Rif (2005). British Warships in the Age of Sail, 1793–1817, Chatham Publishing,
- Naval wars in the Baltic 1553–1850 (1910) – R. C. Anderson
- Lauring, Palle (1972). Billeder af Danmarks historie. Copenhagen: Palle Lauring og Lademann Forlagsaktieselskab.
- Mahan, A.T. (1897). The Life of Nelson, Vol. II. (of 2) The Embodiment of the Sea Power of Great Britain Sampson, Low, Marston and Company
- Nelson's dispatch to Parker about the battle.
- Nelson Society website which has transcriptions of the original British and Danish documents.
- Account including maps of the Battle of Copenhagen
- Lindeberg, Lars (1974). De så det ske: Englandskrigene 1801–14. Copenhagen: Lademann Forlagsaktieselskab.
- Consulatets og Keiserdømmets Historie af A. Thiers. Forhenværende Premierminister, Deputeret og Medlem af det franske Academi. Efter det Franske ved J. C. Magnus. Andet Bind (1845). Copenhagen: Brødrene Berling.
- Denmark and Great Britain Exhibition from the Orlogsmuseet.

== Bibliography ==
- Clarke, James Stanier; McArthur, John (1810). The life of Admiral Lord Nelson, K.B., from his lordship's manuscripts. London: Printed by T. Bensley, for T. Cadell and W. Davies.
- James, William (1837). The Naval History of Great Britain, from the Declaration of War by France in 1793, to the Accession of George IV. Vol. 3. London: R. Bentley.
- Pope, Dudley (1972). The Great Gamble: Nelson at Copenhagen. Littlehampton Book Services. ISBN 978-0-297-00484-4.
- Pocock, Tom (1987). Horatio Nelson. Pimlico. ISBN 0-7126-6123-9.
- Rodger, N. A. M. (2004). "Horatio Nelson". Dictionary of National Biography. Oxford University Press.
- Rodger, N.A.M. (2004). Command of the Ocean. Penguin Books. ISBN 978-0-140-28896-4.
