= John Yelland =

Royal Navy officer (1755–1827)

Captain John Yelland
- Born: 1755
- Died: 1827 (aged 71–72)
- Buried: St George's Field, Bayswater
- Allegiance: Great Britain; United Kingdom
- Branch: Royal Navy
- Service years: 1776–1827
- Rank: Captain
- Conflicts: American War of Independence; Battle of Ushant (1778); Battle of Chesapeake; Battle of the Saintes; French Revolutionary Wars; Battle of Genoa (1795); Battle of Hyeres Islands; Battle of Copenhagen (1801)

Captain John Yelland (1755 – December 1827) was a Royal Navy officer who served in the American War of Independence and French Revolutionary and Napoleonic Wars. He commanded HMS Monarch at Copenhagen in 1801, for which he was mentioned in despatches but despite this and having served under some influential admirals, his promotion was slow and he never rose above the rank of captain.

== Early life and career ==
John Yelland was born in the south-west of England, in or around 1755. He started his career in the Royal Navy as a volunteer, aboard the 74-gun HMS Torbay, soon after the American War of Independence started in 1776. In May 1778, he joined HMS Duke and was serving in her as a midshipman, when she took part in the Battle of Ushant that same year.

Yelland later transferred to HMS London, then carrying the flag of Admiral Thomas Graves in the waters around North America. He remained in her until 1781 when he moved, as acting lieutenant, to HMS Royal Oak, in time for the Battle of Chesapeake in September. In December the Royal Oak was sent to the West Indies where she fought in the Battle of the Saintes, on 12 April 1782.

Following the Treaty of Paris in September 1783, Yelland found himself on half pay and, apart from a short period aboard the fireship Tisiphone in 1790, remained so until war resumed in 1793. He then joined HMS Egmont as a lieutenant, before moving to Admiral William Hotham's flagship, the 100-gun HMS Britannia, where he fought at the battles of Genoa and Hyeres in 1795. Yelland subsequently served in HMS St George and HMS Chichester.

=== Baltic expedition ===
HMS Monarch leading the British fleet through Øresund on 30 March 1801

Yelland failed to secure a position on any ship for the whole of 1797 but in January the following year, signed on as first lieutenant aboard HMS Veteran. When her captain, James Mosse, transferred to HMS Monarch in mid 1799, Yelland went with him. In 1801 they were sent as part of a large expedition, to the Baltic, to break the league of armed neutrality. In March the ship led Admiral Hyde Parker's fleet through the sound between Denmark and Sweden, before joining Horatio Nelson's squadron for the Battle of Copenhagen on 2 April. Monarch suffered the highest number of casualties of any ship in the action with 155 wounded and 55 dead including her captain. Following Mosse's death, early in the battle, Yelland, as next highest-ranking officer, assumed command and was the only junior officer mentioned in the despatches of either Nelson or Parker. The latter writing,

"I cannot close this without acquainting their Lordships, that Captain Mosse being killed very early in the Action, Lieutenant John Yelland continued it with the greatest Spirit and good Conduct; I must therefore, in Justice to his Merit, beg Leave to recommend him to their Lordships' Favour"

Parker could have promoted Yelland himself but chose instead to advance his own favourites. He offered Yelland the position of lieutenant aboard his flagship but Yelland considered this an insult and refused to leave the ship he had fought in. Monarch's new captain was William Bligh, who had been in command of HMS Glatton. On 15 April, Monarch set sail for England, arriving at the Nore on 27 April. Yelland was later promoted to commander but was not given a ship.

== Command ==
In March 1805 Yelland received his first command, the 16-gun fireship HMS Fury, stationed in the English Channel. In April, she, and the squadron she was attached to, engaged 33 gun vessels and 19 transports carrying supplies to the Grande Armee. The flotilla left Dunkirk on 23 April at 21:00 and worked its way down the Channel, getting as far as Calais unseen. It was spotted at dawn on 24 April by a British squadron comprising the 38-gun HMS Leda, two sloops, eight gun-brigs and Fury, all of which, immediately gave chase. The leading British vessels caught up and the first exchanges of fire occurred at 08:00. The action lasted through to the following morning with the British ships also coming under heavy fire from enemy shore batteries, although only one British seaman was injured. Eight of the armed transports were captured; the rest were escorted into Ambleteuse by armed launches sent out from Boulogne.

== Later career ==
Fury appears to have been Yelland's only command. He was later promoted to post-captain but was never given a post-ship. Despite a career serving under some influential officers and in some major battles, Yelland's career never really developed; his promotion to captain was part of a general round of promotions handed out on 22 January 1806, he never went to sea again and did not live long enough to benefit from the customary automatic promotion by seniority. He joined Greenwich Hospital as an out-pensioner in November 1809 and died in December 1827. Yelland was buried in St George's Field cemetery in Bayswater.
