= John Henry Martin =

Royal Navy officer, born 1753

- Born: c. 1753; Pembrokeshire, Wales
- Died: 1823 (aged 69–70)
- Allegiance: Kingdom of Great Britain; United Kingdom
- Branch: Royal Navy

John Henry Martin was a Royal Navy officer who served during the American Revolutionary and French Revolutionary wars. In March 1776, Martin joined HMS Discovery as an able seaman for James Cook's third expedition. He was promoted twice during the voyage, finishing as a lieutenant aboard HMS Resolution. His rank was confirmed on his return to England, and in that capacity, he commanded the bomb vessel HMS Explosion at the Battle of Copenhagen in 1801.

== Early life and career ==
Details from Martin's early life are obscure. The historian Peter Hore suggests Martin was born in Pembrokeshire, Wales, possibly Manorbier, in around 1753.

Martin joined the Royal Navy in 1765, as a midshipman aboard the 8-gun HMS Peggy, which at that time was employed in the protection of fisheries around the Shetland Islands. At the beginning of 1767, Martin transferred to HMS Yarmouth which was serving as a guardship at Sheerness under James Gambier. This appointment was short-lived however; when HMS Romney was recommissioned in 1767, following a refit at Portsmouth, Martin joined her for America. Towards the end of 1769, he joined the 10-gun sloop Bonetta. After 18 months aboard her, he began a short spell in HMS Alderney where he was rated able seaman towards the end of his service, in 1772.

== Cook's voyage ==
In March 1776, Martin joined HMS Discovery for James Cook's third expedition to the Pacific. Initially serving on board as able seaman, he was quickly offered the position of midshipman. Then, in October 1777, Martin was promoted to lieutenant, following the disrating of another, and transferred to Cook's ship, HMS Resolution. Whilst visiting Kauai, in the Hawaiian Islands, a landing party, comprising James King and two others, was chased by hostile natives. Having command of the ship's pinnace, Martin gave the order to give covering fire, and one of the natives was killed.

On 19 October 1780, following his return to England, Martin passed his lieutenant's examination and his promotion was confirmed. In December, he was assigned to the Western Squadron, aboard the 90-gun HMS Union.

== Command ==
On 17 February, Martin was given command HMS Xenophon in the North Sea. In November, his ship was requisitioned for the 1801 circumnavigation of Australia under Matthew Flinders, and he was transferred to the bomb ship, HMS Explosion. It was in Explosion that Martin served at the Battle of Copenhagen in April 1801 and the two-day bombardment of Boulogne in August.

== Personal life ==
Martin married twice and had a son with his first wife in around 1806. Martin was survived by his second wife when he died in 1823.

== Bibliography ==
- Hore, Peter (2015). Nelson's Band of Brothers: Lives and Memorials. Barnsley.: Seaforth Publishing. ISBN 9781848327795.
- Winfield, Rif (2007). British Warships in the Age of Sail 1714–1792: Design, Construction, Careers and Fates. Barnsley: Seaforth Publishing. ISBN 978-1-84415-700-6.
