= HMS Monarch (1765) =

Ship of the line of the Royal Navy

- Monarch (second from right) passing the Øresund on 30 March 1801

History

Great Britain
- Name: HMS Monarch
- Ordered: 22 November 1760
- Builder: Deptford Dockyard
- Launched: 20 July 1765
- Fate: Broken up, 1813
- Notes: Participated in: First Battle of Ushant; Battle of Cape St Vincent; Battle of the Chesapeake; Capture of Sint Eustatius; Battle of St. Kitts; Battle of the Saintes; Battle of the Mona Passage; Battle of Muizenberg; Battle of Camperdown; Battle of Copenhagen

General characteristics
- Class & type: Ramillies-class ship of the line
- Tons burthen: 1612 bm
- Length: 168 ft 6 in (51.36 m) (gundeck)
- Beam: 46 ft 9 in (14.25 m)
- Depth of hold: 19 ft 9 in (6.02 m)
- Propulsion: Sails
- Sail plan: Full-rigged ship
- Armament: 74 guns: Gundeck: 28 × 32 pdrs; Upper gundeck: 28 × 18 pdrs; Quarterdeck: 14 × 9 pdrs; Forecastle: 4 × 9 pdrs

HMS Monarch was a 74-gun third-rate ship of the line of the Royal Navy built by Adam Hayes and launched on 20 July 1765 at Deptford Dockyard.

== Service history ==
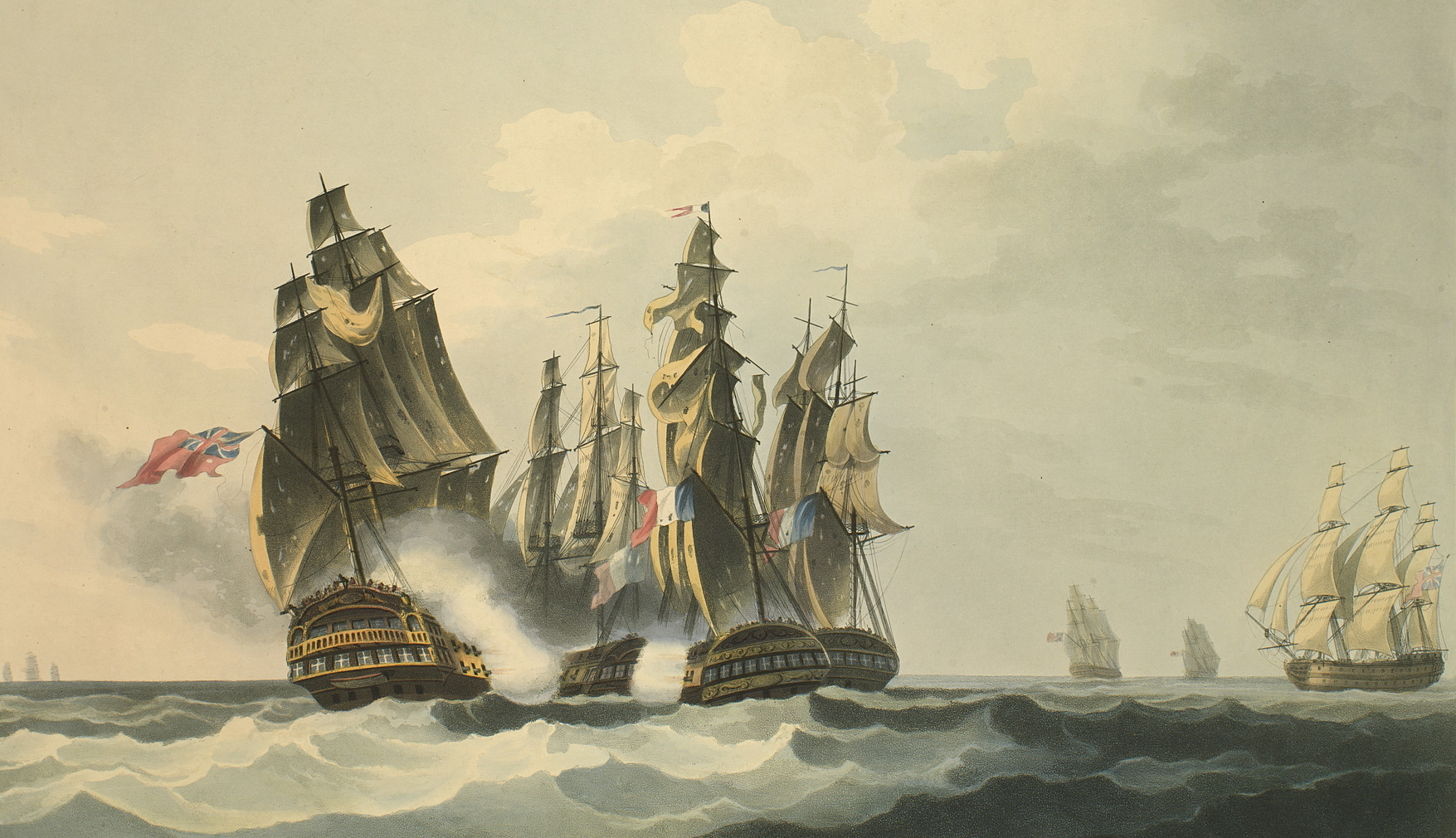
Monarch (first from left) at the action of 25 September 1806

Monarch had a very active career, fighting in her first battle in 1778 at the First Battle of Ushant and her second under Admiral Rodney at Cape St. Vincent in 1780. She fought in the van of Graves' fleet at the Battle of the Chesapeake in 1781 under Admiral Francis Reynolds. In early 1782 she was actively engaged at the Capture of Sint Eustatius, Action of 4 February 1781, the Battle of Saint Kitts, the Battle of the Saintes and, the Battle of the Mona Passage.

Monarch was at Plymouth on 20 January 1795 and so shared in the proceeds of the detention of the Dutch naval vessels, East Indiamen, and other merchant vessels that were in port on the outbreak of war between Britain and the Netherlands. Later in 1795 she was part of the small fleet under Admiral George Elphinstone that captured the Cape of Good Hope from the Dutch East India Company at the Battle of Muizenberg.

In 1797 Monarch was Vice Admiral Richard Onslow's flagship at the Battle of Camperdown, under Captain Edward O'Bryen In 1801 Monarch was part of Admiral Nelson's fleet at the Battle of Copenhagen, where her captain, James Robert Mosse was killed early in the action and replaced by Lieutenant John Yelland, the next highest-ranking officer. Monarch suffered over 200 casualties including 55 dead, the highest number of casualties of any ship engaged in the battle. In 1807, Monarch helped escort the Portuguese royal family in its flight from Portugal to Brazil. Monarch was broken up in 1813.

== See also ==
- Fourth Anglo-Dutch War
