= William and Ann (1759) =

British merchant ship 1759–1857

History

Great Britain
- Name: William and Ann
- Owner: Samuel Enderby & Sons; St. Barbe & Company
- Launched: 1759 (or 1742), King's Yard (possibly Ipswich)
- Fate: Last listed 1857

General characteristics
- Tons burthen: 370, or 376, or 388, or 3881/14 (bm)
- Draught: 16 feet (4.9 m)
- Sail plan: Ship rig
- Armament: 1812: 6 × 6-pounder guns + 2 × 18-pounder carronades
- Notes: Two decks

William and Ann (or William and Anne), was built at a King's Yard (naval dockyard) in 1759, under another name. From 1786 until 1791 she was a whaler in the northern whale fishery. In 1791 she transported convicts to New South Wales and then began whale hunting around New Zealand; she returned to England in 1793. Circa 1801 she again became a whaler in the northern whale fishery, sailing from Leith. She continued whaling until 1839. She then began trading widely, to Bahia, Bombay, Archangel, Spain, Honduras, and the Mediterranean. She was last listed in 1857, having been in service for over 90 years.

== Career ==
She was lengthened and raised in 1767, becoming 370 tons; a new upper part and thorough repairs were undertaken in 1785. She first appeared in Lloyd's Register (LR) as William and Ann in 1786. Her immediate previous name was Ipswich. Missing volumes of LR and missing pages in extant volumes of LR have so far made it impossible to trace her back through name changes to her origins in the Royal Navy. Repairs to fix previous repair work were undertaken in 1789. Further repairs were undertaken in 1791, when she was sheathed and doubled.

Year	Master	Owner	Trade	Source
1786	H.Gilbert	W.Gilson & Co.	London–Greenland	LR; thorough repair 1785
1790	H.Gilbert	Sims & Co.	London–Greenland	LR; thorough repair 1785
1791	H.Ollburg; E.Bunker	St.Barbe & Co.	London–Davis strait	LR; thorough repair 1785, damages repaired 1789, & good repair 1791
1792	E.Bunker	St.Barbe & Co.	London–Botany Bay	LR; thorough repair 1785, damages repaired 1789, & good repair 1791

Under the command of Master Eber Bunker, she departed Plymouth as part of the third fleet on 27 March 1791, and arrived on 28 August 1791 in Port Jackson, New South Wales. She embarked 188 male convicts, of whom seven died during the voyage.

Captain Bunker then conducted the first recorded visit by a whaling ship to New Zealand, calling in at Doubtless Bay in 1791 while hunting sperm whales in the South Pacific. William and Anne was reported off the coast of Peru in 1792. She returned to Sydney and thence sailed to England. She was reported off the coast of Brazil in March 1793. She returned to England on 20 May 1793 with 68 tuns of sperm oil and 8468 seal skins.

Year	Master	Owner	Trade	Source & notes
1794	J.Cowon	St.Barbe & Co.	London–Botany Bay	LR; thorough repair 1785, damages repaired 1789, & good repair 1791
1797	J.Cowan	St.Barbe & Co.	London–Botany Bay	LR; thorough repair 1785, damages repaired 1789, & good repair 1791
1798	J.Caitline	Mather & Co.	London transport	LR; thorough repair 1785, damages repaired 1789, & good repair 1791
1801	J.Caitline; T.Hanson	Mather & Co.	London transport London–Greenland	LR; thorough repair 1785, damages repaired 1789, & good repair 1791
1802	T.Hanson; R.Kellie	Mather & Co.	London–Greenland	LR; thorough repair 1785, damages repaired 1789, & good repair 1791

In April 1802 William and Ann, Kelly, master, sailed from Leith for Davis Strait, but had to put back into Stromness, leaky.

Year	Master	Owner	Trade	Source & notes
1803	R.Kellie; B.Lyons	Woods & Co.	London–Davis Strait; Leith–Davis Strait	LR; thorough 1785, damages repaired 1789, & good repair 1791
1804	B.Lyons	Woods & Co.	London–Davis Strait; Leith–Davis Strait	LR; damages repaired 1789, good repair 1794, & repairs 1802
1807	B.Lyons; Davidson	Wood & Co.	Leith–Davis Strait	LR; damages repaired 1789, good repair 1794, & repairs 1802
1808	Davidson	Wood & Co.	Leith–Davis Strait	Register of Shipping; damages repaired 1789, & good repair 1791, & repairs 1802
1812	Davidson	Wood & Co.	Leith–Davis Strait	Register of Shipping; repairs 1808 & large repair 1810

Year	Master	Where	"Fish" (Whales)	Tuns whale oil
1809	Davidson	Davis Strait	19	Full
1810	Davidson	Davis Strait	6	
1812	Davidson	Davis Strait	18	Full
1813	Davidson	Davis Strait	8	
1814	Davidson	Davis Strait	7	

The data below for the period between 1814 and 1839 comes primarily from Coltish, though amended or corrected with reports in the contemporary press.

Year	Master	Where	"Fish" (Whales)	Tuns whale oil
1814	Davidson	Greenland	11	77
1815	Davidson	Davis Strait	8	55
1816	Davidson	Davis Strait	8	60
1817	Davidson	Davis Strait	4	29.5
1818	Davidson	Davis Strait	0	0
1819	Wake	Davis Strait	7	42.5
Wake	1820	Davis Strait	17	83.5
1821	Wake	Greenland	1	8.5
1823	Wake	Greenland	32	127 (Full)
1824	Wake		5	31.5
1825	Wake		3	
1826	Wake	Davis Strait	4	25.5
1827	[William] Smith		27	240
1828	Smith		10	54
1829	Smith		14	76
1830	Smith		0	Clean
1831	Liston		8	50
1832	Liston		39	136.5
1833	Liston		12	160
1834	Liston		11	75.5
1835	Liston		1	8
1836	Stratton			

In 1836 the whaler Swan became beset in ice and overwintered in Davis Strait, drifting with the ice. William and Ann was the first whaler to sight Swan, on 14 May. Swan was then some 30 miles west of Disco and Captain Stairton's men refused to go to Swan's assistance on the grounds that Swan was far off and they weren't paid to do so. She was only able to get free because the crews of five whalers came upon her and sawed 3000 feet of heavy ice to get her out. (One of the five may have been William and Ann.)

Year	Master	Where	"Fish" (Whales)	Tuns whale oil
1837	Stratton		2	15
1837	Stratton		10	80
1839	Stratton	DS	5	22.5

Year	Master	Owner	Trade	Source
1839	J.Straiton; Pearson	Woods	Leith–Davis Strait; Leith–Hull	LR; large repairs 1823 & 1828, and small repairs 1810, 1833, &1834
1840	Pearson	Woods	Leith–Hull; Hull–Bahia	LR; large repairs 1823 & 1828, and small repairs 1810, 1833, & 1834
1841	Pearson	Woods	Hull–Bahia; Hull–Bombay	LR; small repairs 1840 & 1842
1842	Pearson	Woods	Hull–Bombay; London–Archangel	LR; small repairs 1840 & 1842
1843	Pearson	Woods	London–Archangel; Hull–Cape of Good Hoop	LR; small repairs 1840 & 1842
1845	Pearson; Creser	Woods	Hull–Cape of Good Hoop; Liverpool	LR; small repairs 1840, 1842, & 1845
1846	Creser; Davis	Woods	Liverpool; Liverpool–Africa	LR; small repairs 1840, 1842, 1845, & 1846
1847	S.Davis	Woods; Denham	London	LR; almost rebuilt 1823, small repairs 1846 & 1848
1848	J.Scott	Denham	London–Spain	LR; almost rebuilt 1823, small repairs 1846 & 1848–
1851	J.Scott	Denham	Shields–Spain	LR; almost rebuilt 1823, small repairs 1848 & 1851
1853	J.Scott	Denham	London–Honduras	LR; almost rebuilt 1823, small repairs 1848 & 1851
1854		Denham	London	LR; almost rebuilt 1823, small repairs 1848 & 1851
1856	W.Magub	R.Magub	Cardiff–Mediterranean	LR; almost rebuilt 1823, small repairs 1851 & 1854
1857	W.Magub	R.Magub		LR
