= William Fergusson (physician) =

Scottish inspector-general of military hospitals and medical writer

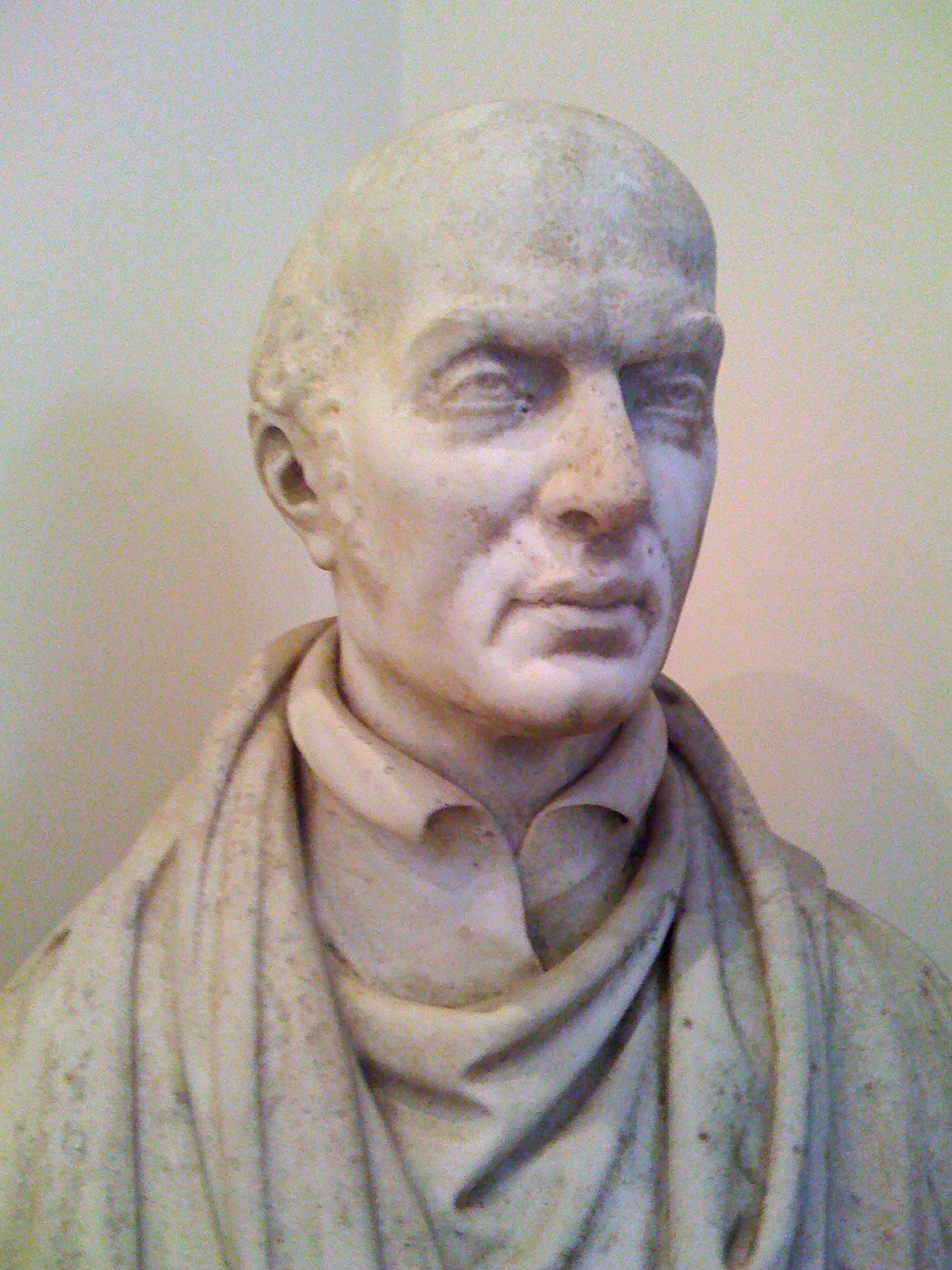
- From a posthumous marble bust in the possession of the family
- Born: 1773; Ayr
- Died: 1846 (aged 72–73); St John's Wood, London
- Resting place: Highgate Cemetery

Dr William Fergusson FRSE (1773–1846) was a Scottish inspector-general of military hospitals, and medical writer.

== Life ==
He was born in Ayr 19 June 1773 into a prominent local family. From Ayr Academy he went to attend the medical classes at Edinburgh University, where he graduated MB, afterwards attending the London hospitals. In 1794 he became assistant-surgeon in the army, and served in Holland, the West Indies, the Baltic, the Iberian Peninsula, and in the expedition against Guadeloupe in 1815.

Fergusson is widely quoted (though often misspelt) as a source of accounts of the Battle of Copenhagen in 1801, where he was present (as Staff-Surgeon of the troops embarked) with Admiral Lord Nelson on the flagship Elephant, before being entrusted with the conveyance of the British wounded to Yarmouth.

He received his doctorate (MD) from St Andrews University in 1812.

Having retired from military service in 1817, he settled in practice at Edinburgh, being elected a Fellow of the Royal Society of Edinburgh in 1818. His proposers were Thomas Charles Hope, Sir David Brewster and James Russell. In 1819 he was elected a member of the Harveian Society of Edinburgh.

In 1821 he moved to Windsor on the invitation of the Duke of Gloucester, on whose staff he had been for twenty years. He acquired a lucrative practice both in the town and country around, which he carried on till 1843, when he was disabled by paralysis.

He died on 19 January 1846 and is buried with his son, James Fergusson (1808–1886), on the west side of Highgate Cemetery.

His personal papers are preserved in the library of the University of Yale.

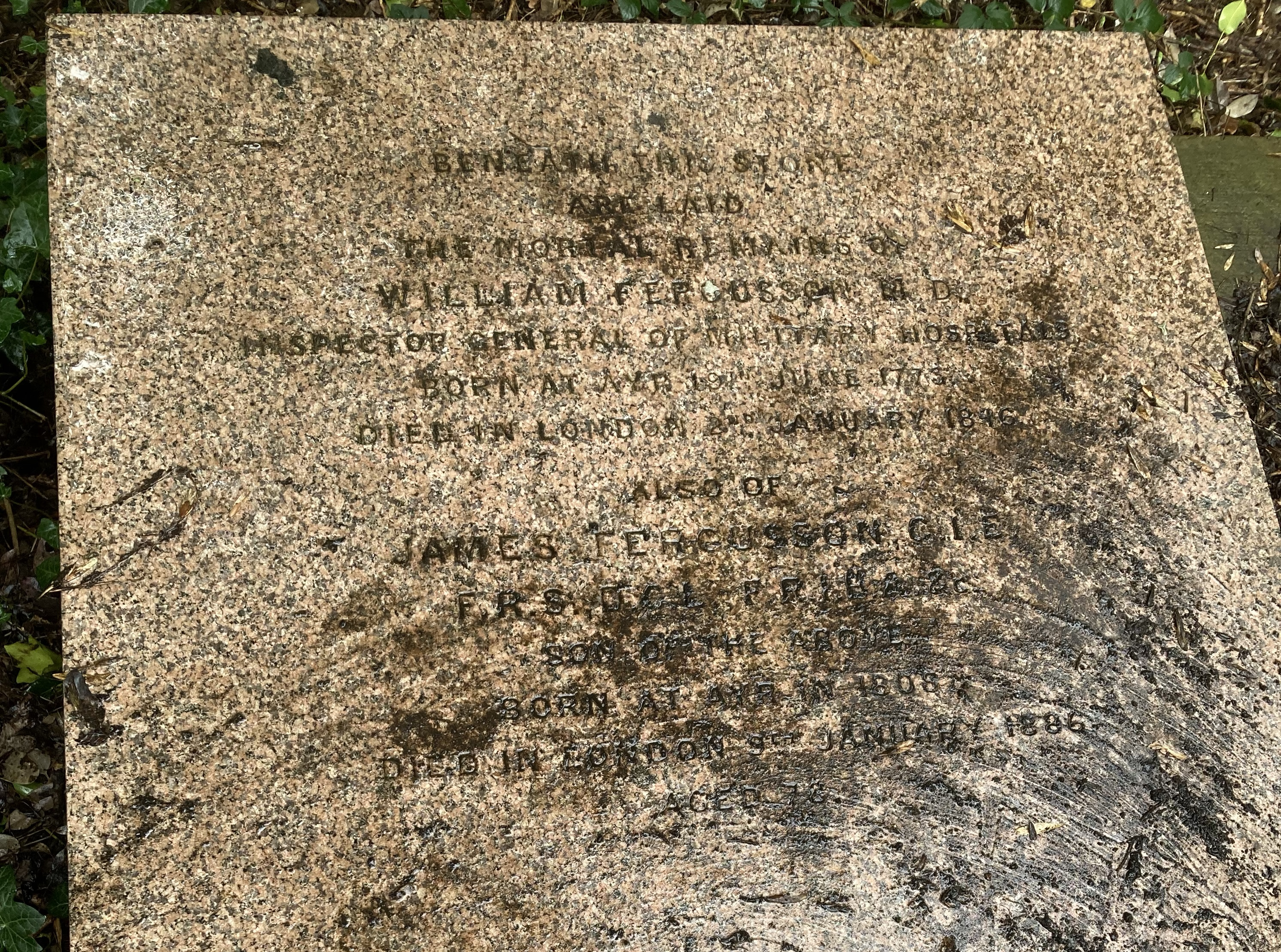
Grave of William and James Fergusson in Highgate Cemetery

== Works ==
He wrote many papers on military medicine, contributed original work to the Edinburgh Medical and Surgical Journal, and his papers were read at the Royal Society of Edinburgh.

His Notes and Recollections of a Professional Life, a collection of his papers on various subjects, was brought out after his death by his son. The papers are not all medical, one section of the book being on military tactics. There is an essay on syphilis in Portugal, as affecting the British troops and the natives respectively.

The essay for which Fergusson is most remembered is that on the "marsh poison" theory of malarial infection, reprinted from the Transactions of the Royal Society of Edinburgh January 1820. He emphasised the fact that malarial fevers often occur on dry and barren soils, either sandy plains or rocky uplands, where rotting vegetation as a cause is out of the question, relying on his own experience with troops in Holland, Portugal, and the West Indies. This was a significant step towards rationalising the doctrine of malaria. But although in his other writings he was possibly the first to correctly suggest insects as vectors of plague, he tantalizingly failed to make the final connection between malaria and mosquitos.
