= James Fergusson (architect) =

Scottish historian

James Fergusson FRS
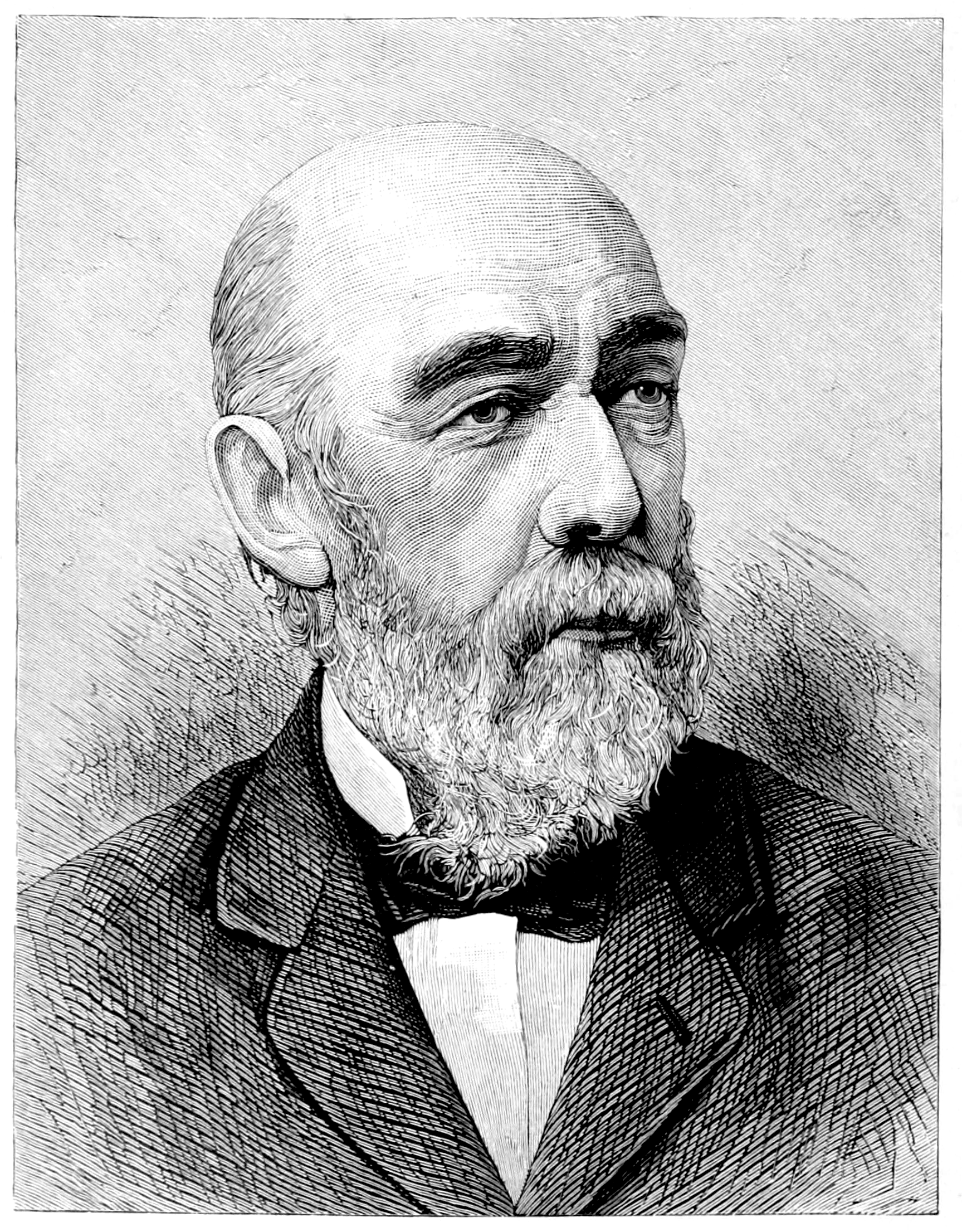
- Born: 22 January 1808; Ayr
- Died: 9 January 1886 (aged 77); London
- Resting place: Highgate Cemetery
- Father: William Fergusson (physician)

James Fergusson FRS (22 January 1808 – 9 January 1886) was a Scottish architectural historian, mainly remembered for his interest in Indian historical architecture and antiquities. He was an important figure in the 19th-century rediscovery of ancient India. He was originally a businessman, and though not formally trained as an architect, designed some buildings and decorative schemes.

== Life ==
=== Education and India ===
Fergusson was born in Ayr, the son of William Fergusson (1773–1846) an army surgeon turned medical writer, and inspector of hospitals. After being educated first at the Royal High School, Edinburgh, and then at a private school in Hounslow, he went to India to work as a manager at his family's mercantile house of Fairlie, Fergusson & Co. of Calcutta. Here he became interested in the remains of the ancient architecture of India, little known or understood at that time. The successful conduct of an indigo factory, as he states in his own account, enabled him to retire from business after about ten years and settle in London.

His observations on Indian architecture were first published in his book on The Rock-cut Temples of India, published in 1845. The task of analysing the historic and aesthetic relations of this type of ancient buildings led him further to undertake a historical and critical comparative survey of the whole subject of architecture in The Illustrated Handbook of Architecture, being a Concise and Popular Account of the different Styles of Architecture prevailing in all Ages and Countries, a work which first appeared in 1855 in two volumes. It was followed in 1862 by one entitled A History of the Modern Styles of Architecture, being a sequel to the Handbook of Architecture.

The 1855 work was reissued ten years later in a much more extended form in three volumes, under the title of A History of Architecture in all Countries from the Earliest Times to the Present Day. The chapters on Indian architecture, which had been considered at rather disproportionate length in the Handbook, were removed from the general History, and the whole of this subject treated more fully in a separate volume, The History of Indian and Eastern Architecture, which appeared in 1876, as the fourth volume to The History of Architecture. The 1876 work was later revised with additions by James Burgess and Richard Phené Spiers in 1910 and published in two volumes.

=== United Kingdom ===
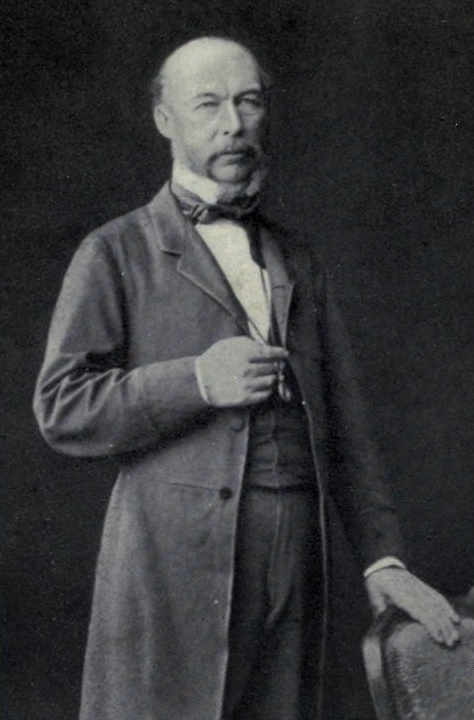

In 1849 Fergusson published a metaphysical study, Historical Inquiry into the True Principles of Beauty in Art: More Especially with Reference to Architecture. Some of his essays on special points in archaeology, such as the treatise on The Mode in which Light was introduced into Greek Temples, included theories on Greek temples which did not receive general acceptance.

Like many of his contemporaries, Fergusson was concerned about British preparedness to resist a French invasion and he published An Essay on a Proposed New System of Fortification: with Hints for its Application to our National Defences (1849), The Peril of Portsmouth; or, French Fleets and English Forts (1852) and Portsmouth Protected: a Sequel to the Peril of Portsmouth (1856). In 1859, he was the only civilian appointed to the Royal Commission on the Defence of the United Kingdom, which subsequently recommended a huge programme of coastal fortifications that became known as "Palmerston's Follies".

He received the gold medal of the Royal Institute of British Architects in 1871. Among his works, besides those already mentioned, are: Palaces of Nineveh and Persepolis restored (1851), Mausoleum at Halicarnassus restored (1862), Tree and Serpent Worship (1868), Rude Stone Monuments in all Countries (1872), and The Temples of the Jews and the other Buildings in the Haram Area at Jerusalem (1878). The sessional papers of the Institute of British Architects include papers by him on The History of the Pointed Arch, Architecture of Southern India, Architectural Splendour of the City of Beeja pore, on the Erechtheum and on the Temple of Diana at Ephesus.

Although not a prolific practising architect, a small number of examples of Fergusson's architecture remain in existence, the most notable of which are the parliament building of Jamaica, and the Marianne North Gallery in Kew Gardens.

Fergusson was adviser with Austen Henry Layard in the scheme of decoration for the Assyrian court at The Crystal Palace, and in 1856 assumed the duties of general manager to the Crystal Palace Company, a post which he held for two years. In 1866 he was a member of a committee to advise Henry Scott on design aspects of the Royal Albert Hall, along with architects William Tite and Matthew Digby Wyatt, and the engineers John Hawkshaw and John Fowler.

In 1847 Fergusson published An Essay on the Ancient Topography of Jerusalem, in which he contended that the Mosque of Omar was the identical church built by Constantine the Great over the tomb of our Lord at Jerusalem, and that it, and not the present church of the Holy Sepulchre, was the genuine burial-place of Jesus. The burden of this contention was further explained by the publication in 1860 of his Notes on the Site of the Holy Sepulchre at Jerusalem; and The Temples of the Jews and the other Buildings in the Haram Area at Jerusalem, published in 1878, which was a further elaboration of these theories, which are said to have been the origin of the establishment of the Palestine Exploration Fund.

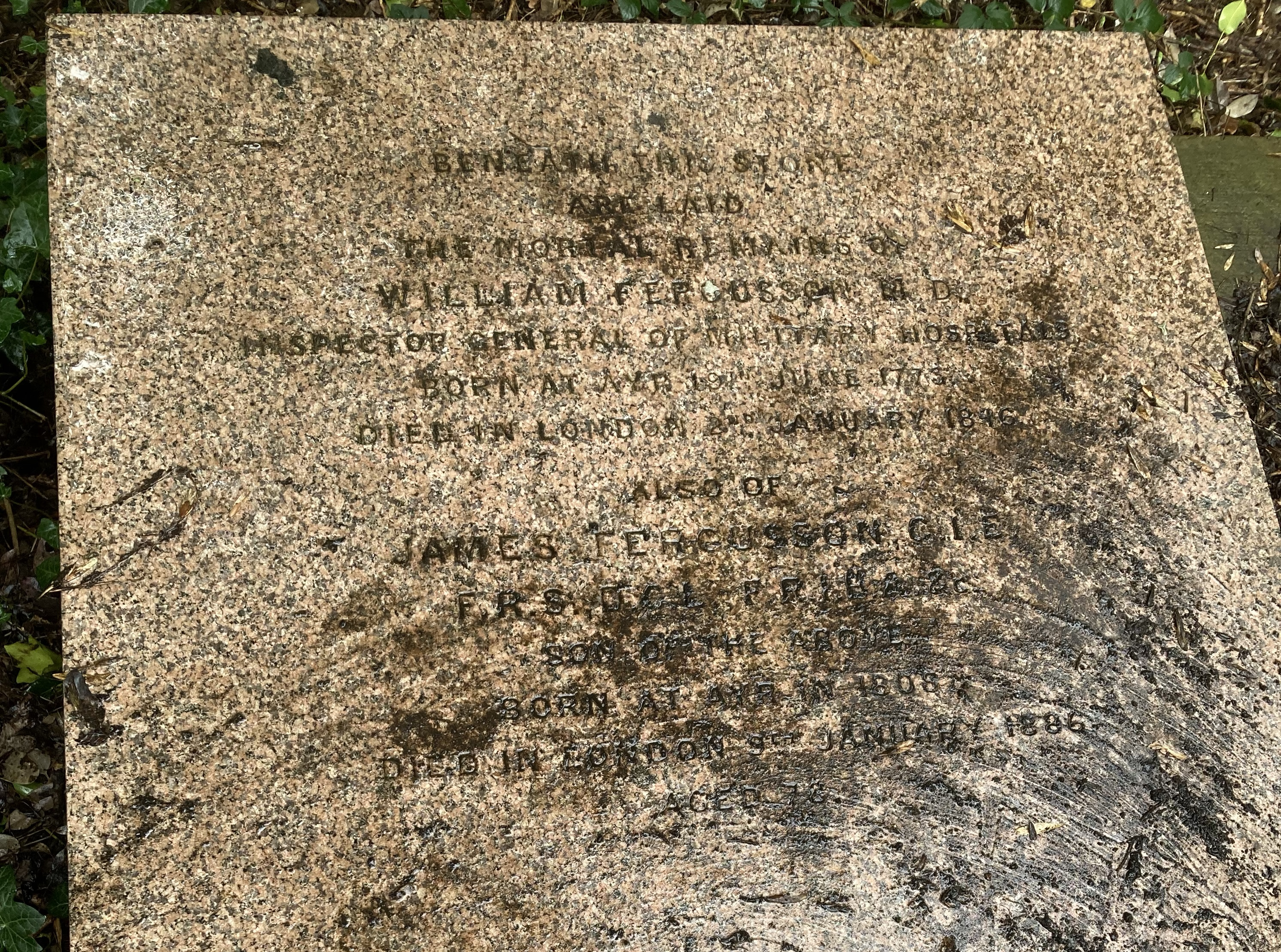
Grave of William and James Fergusson in Highgate Cemetery

Fergusson died in London on 9 January 1886 and is buried with his father on the west side of Highgate Cemetery.

== Selected publications ==
- Fergusson, James. An Essay on the Ancient Topography of Jerusalem, with Restored Plans of the Temple, &c., and Plans, Sections, and Details of The Church Built by Constantinople the Great over the Holy Sepulchre, now known as the Mosque of Omar, and other illustrations (1847). London: John Weale.
- Fergusson, James. An Historical Inquiry into the True Principles of Beauty in Art, More Especially With Reference to Architecture (1849), London: Longman, Brown, Green and Longmans.
- Fergusson, James. An Essay on a Proposed New System of Fortification: With Hints for its Application to our National Defences (1849), London: John Weale.
- Fergusson, James. The Illustrated Handbook of Architecture (1855). London: John Murray. Vol. I and Vol II.
- Fergusson, James. Tree and Serpent Worship, or Illustrations of Mythology and Art in India, (1868) London: W H Allen & Co.
- Fergusson, James. Rude Stone Monuments in All Countries, (1872) London: John Murray, Albemarle Street.
- Fergusson, James. History of the Modern Styles of Architecture (1891). New York: Dodd, Mead. Vol. I and Vol. II.
- Fergusson, James, et al. 'History of Indian and Eastern Architecture, 2nd Edition (1910). London: J. Murray. Vol. I and Vol. II
