= HDMS Nidelven =

History

Denmark-Norway
- Name: HDMS Nidelven
- Namesake: Nidelva
- Builder: Copenhagen
- Launched: 1 December 1792
- Captured: Surrendered at the capture of Copenhagen on 7 September 1807

United Kingdom
- Acquired: Seized at Copenhagen
- Fate: Sold 3 November 1814

General characteristics
- Class & type: Lougen-class brig
- Tons burthen: 31168/94 (bm)
- Length: Overall:94 ft 4 in (28.8 m); Keel:76 ft 7 in (23.3 m)
- Beam: 27 ft 8 in (8.4 m)
- Depth of hold: 10 ft 7 in (3.2 m)
- Propulsion: Sail
- Sail plan: Brig
- Complement: 100 (British service)
- Armament: Danish servie:16 guns; British service:16 × 24-pounder carronades + 2 × 6-pounder chase guns

HDMS Nidelven was a brig launched at Copenhagen on 1 December 1792. She was present at both British attacks on Copenhagen (1801 and 1807), and the British Royal Navy seized her at Copenhagen on 7 September 1807 at the surrender of Copenhagen. The British took her into service as HMS Nid Elven. She served between 1808 and 1809, during which time she captured a small French privateer. She was laid up in 1809. The Navy sold her in 1814.

== Construction and design ==
Nidelven was one nine Lougen-class brigs designed by the naval architect Ernst Wilhelm Stibolt.

== Danish service ==
In 1793 Captain Ferdinand A Braun commanded Nidelven in the home fleet, and in 1794–1795 sailed her to the West Indies

In 1796 Captain Hans Michael Kaas (1760 - 1799) cruised the Norwegian coast, enforcing the neutrality rules. (Note: He was the son of Captain Frederik Christian Kaas.)

After a period in 1797 as watch ship at Altona, Captain Hans Holsten took Nidelven for two years to the Mediterranean, returning to Copenhagen on 31 October 1800.

During the Battle of Copenhagen (1801) Nidelven served in Olfert Fischer's division in the Inner Run under Chamberlain Steen Bille and did not engage in any actual fighting.

In 1802 the ship saw service in the North Sea under Captain Cornelius Wieugel.

In 1805 Nidelven was in the home squadron under Captain Johan H. E. van Berger.

== British service ==
The British took possession of Nideleven under the terms of capitulation following the second battle of Copenhagen on 7 September 1807. She arrived at Woolwich on 24 October where she was fitted out from October to 20 March 1808. She was to be renamed Legere but the Admiralty canceled the name change.

After refit she joined the British Navy as HMS Nid Elven. Nid Elven was commissioned in February 1808 under Commander Richard James Lawrence O'Connor for the North Sea.

On 17 December 1808 she captured the French privateer brig General Rapp of eight guns and 41 men. General Rapp had left Danzig (now Gdansk) the evening before. (Note: A first-class share of the head money for the 41 men was worth £38 5d; a sixth-class share, that of an ordinary seaman, was worth 15s 8½d.)

On 14 May 1809 Ned Elvin captured Tros Softres.

Between 20 September and 9 October Ned Elvin captured five Danish vessels and two boats.

HMS Childers was in sight when Nid Elven captured Susanna Catharina. Childers also shared by agreement in Ned Elvin's capture of Wohlfarth, and Hans Barend on 19 November 1809.

Nid Elven was laid up in December 1809.

== Fate ==
The "Principal Officers and Commissioners of His Majesty's Navy" offered "Nid Elven, of 311 tons", lying at Sheerness, for sale on 3 November 1814. She sold on that date for £600.
