= Richard Hatherill =

Royal Navy officer, born 1769

Captain Richard Hatherill
- Born: 20 September 1769
- Died: 1804 (aged 34–35)
- Allegiance: Kingdom of Great Britain; United Kingdom
- Branch: Royal Navy
- Service years: 1783–1804
- Rank: Post-captain

Richard Hatherill (20 September 1769 – 1804) was a British Royal Navy officer who served during the French Revolutionary War. Born in Queenborough, Kent, on 20 September 1769, he is recorded as having first served aboard HMS Dictator from September 1783. He passed his lieutenant's examination in 1790 and joined HMS Repulse in that capacity on 18 October 1794. It was aboard this ship that he became embroiled in the Nore Mutiny in 1797. Hatherill and other loyal members of the crew were able to retake the ship and bring her in under heavy fire from the other mutinied ships. In 1800, the ship he was serving on was wrecked on the French coast and crew captured. Hatherill was later released in an exchange of officers.

As a lieutenant, Hatherill commanded the bomb vessel, HMS Hecla which took part in the bombardment of Kronborg and Trekroner in March and April 1801 respectively. He was promoted to post captain following the Peace of Amiens but does not appear to have gone to sea again. By October 1804, Hatherill had become severely ill and died shortly after at the age of 35.

== Early life ==
Richard Hatherill was born on 20 September 1769 in the Kent town of Queenborough. His parents, Joseph and Elizabeth Hatherill had been living there since 1775, when the newly ordained Joseph was appointed perpetual curate.

Joseph served as a chaplain in the Royal Navy in 1779 and 1803, which, together with exposure to the maritime and fishing industries on the Thames and Medway rivers, may have influenced his son Richard's decision to seek employment at sea. Hatherill attended a charity-run school in London but missed more than a year of his education when he suffered an illness in 1780.

== Service ==
From September 1783 until March 1786, Hatherill is recorded as being the chaplain's servant on the newly built HMS Dictator. He joined the 28-gun frigate HMS Maidstone, in October 1786 where he was initially rated as able seaman. In 1787, the frigate was part of a small squadron under Horatio Nelson in Antigua. In 1788, Hatherill advanced to the position of midshipman aboard Maidstone.

Hatherill later served aboard HMS London and HMS Royal Sovereign where he passed his lieutenant's examination in 1790. Although he was not listed as being on half pay between 1790 and 1794, it is not clear whether Hatherill was assigned to a ship or not during that period. Hatherill joined HMS Repulse on 18 October 1794. He was still aboard during the Nore Mutiny of 1797, when loyal members of the crew managed to bring Repulse to shore while receiving fire from other ships. Four of the mutineers were pardoned; six were court martialled.

Hatherill was the fourth lieutenant on board Repulse when she was holed on some rocks in March 1800. After taking on two foot of water, the first lieutenant, left in command by her incapacitated captain, ordered Repulse beached on the French coast where she had been on blockade duty. The crew were taken prisoner but Hatherill was later released in an exchange of officers. Hatherill, who had been on watch that afternoon, was questioned at the court-martial which took place in June.

== Command ==
On 16 January 1801, Hatherill became the commander of the bomb vessel, HMS Hecla of 10 guns. In March, she took part in the bombardment of Kronborg and in April, Trekroner Fort. Hatherill and his ship left Copenhagen for Lowestoft in July before joining a two-day attack on Boulogne in August, after which he was ordered to take Hecla to the Nore for repairs. She then paid off.

In celebration of the Peace of Amiens, a number of officers were given promotions, and Hatherill received the rank of Post Captain on 29 April 1802. He does not appear to have been given a ship however, even when the war resumed. He wrote to the Admiralty on at least two occasions, in March 1803 and July 1804, asking for employment.

== Personal life ==
Hatherill married Mary Pennall on 16 July 1800 but they had no children. Hatherill made his will on 29 October 1804, having become severely unwell. He left everything to his wife. Hatherill died shortly after, at the age of 35, and was buried on 15 November.
