= James Robert Mosse =

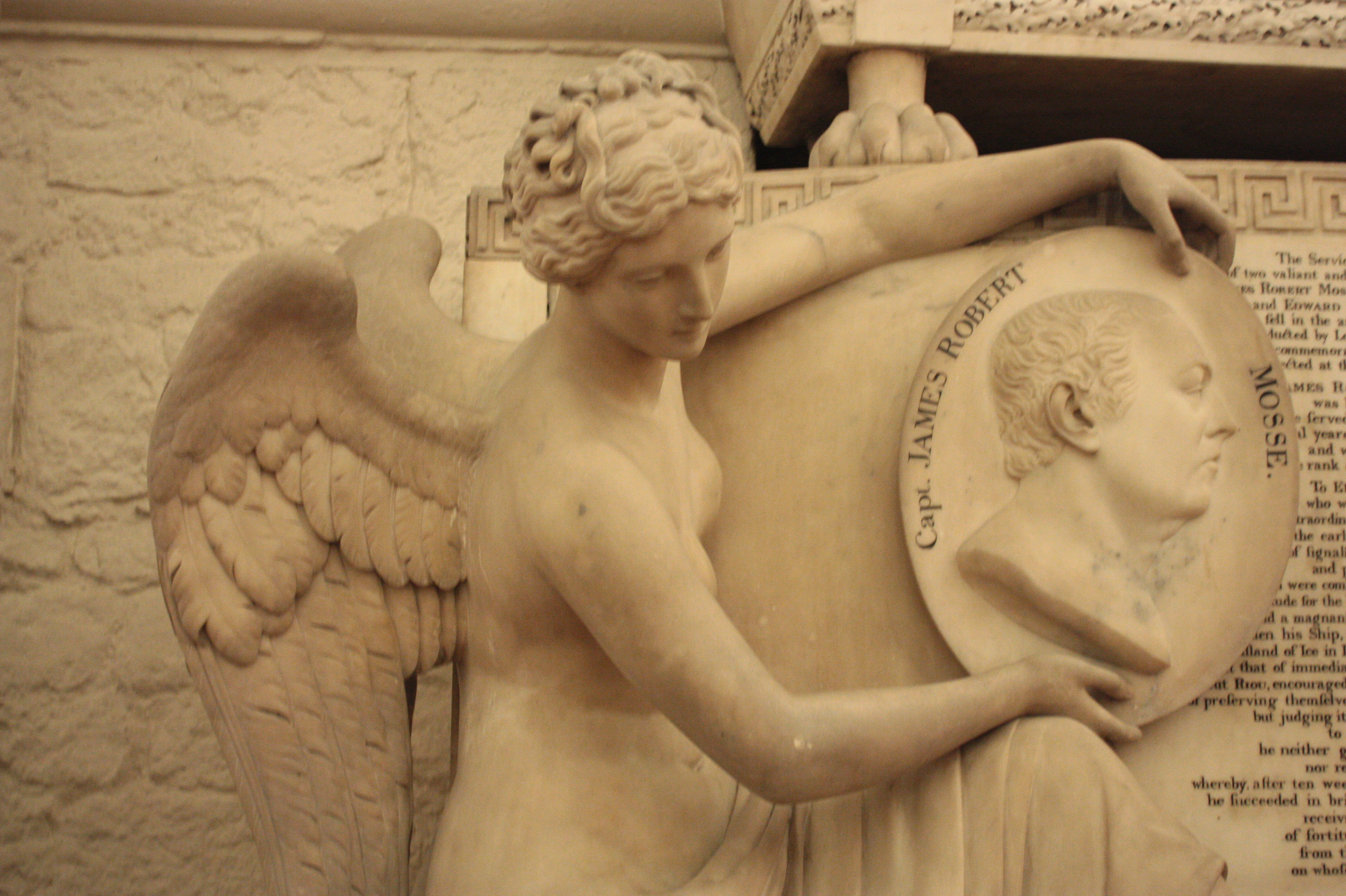
Monument to Mosse at St Paul's Cathedral

Captain James Robert Mosse (1745 – 2 April 1801) was a Royal Navy officer killed during his command at the Battle of Copenhagen during the War of the Second Coalition. He was also one of the prosecution during the trials of the participants of the Nore Mutiny.

== Early life ==
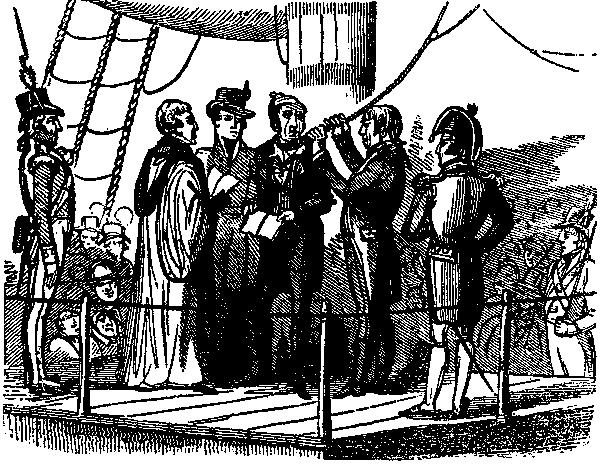
Richard Parker about to be hanged for his part in the Nore mutiny. Mosse is the figure on the right.

He was born from a long line of naval commanders. He was baptised at Little Missenden in Buckinghamshire, on 5 December 1745. At the age of 11 years and 8 months, on 6 August 1757, he took on the role of captain's servant (then a standard route into a commissioned rank) on the newly built HMS Burford, where he served until October 1758. In November 1758 he joined HMS Lizard as a master's mate where he remained until May 1763, serving in the Americas and West Indies. During this period Mosse was captured by the Americans and held prisoner for some time.

From 1763 until 1771 he served on the English Channel on several ships: Hussar, Tweed, Yarmouth and Bellona. In 1771 he was promoted to midshipman under the overall command of Sir Robert Harland, and served on HMS Northumberland in the East Indies. In October 1771 he was promoted to lieutenant, and served on Swallow, Orford and Buckingham before returning to England in 1775.

After a brief respite, presumably in the company of his family, he returned to active duties in March 1776, stationed in what was then the critical location of North America, under Lord Howe. Here he served on HMS Juno until her scuttling at Rhode Island in 1778 to evade capture. He was then posted to the relatively new HMS Eagle. He returned to England briefly, marrying Ann Grace Kinchin of Stoke Charity on 16 March 1780 at Deane, Hampshire before being redeployed in October 1780 again to the West Indies. Here he served on Alfred and Vengeance. In April 1782 he received a post of first lieutenant under Lord Howe on HMS Victory and was subsequently present at the Great Siege of Gibraltar in October of that year, where he commanded the fireship Pluto as part of the attack.

=== Captaincy and death ===
On 19 April 1783 he was confirmed in the rank of master and commander, rising to captain soon thereafter, and he served in the English Channel as captain of Wasp, a duty which continued until 1790, but whose proximity to England probably permitted more home leave than previously. A three-year gap in his service record possibly reflects a well-deserved break. His career then resumes in February 1793 as captain of Sandwich patrolling the sandbanks of the Thames at Nore. In 1797 he therefore became deeply embroiled in the Nore Mutiny and was part of the prosecution and execution of its ringleader Richard Parker, both of which took place on board Mosse’s ship.

He changed command soon thereafter, and served in the North Sea for 18 months until April 1799, during which time he commanded both Braak and Veteran. Despite his numerous absences they had six children. On 1 May 1799 Mosse had been appointed captain of HMS Monarch under the overall command of Admiral Horatio Nelson. On 30 March 1801 Monarch, under Mosse's command, led the fleet through the Sound of Copenhagen towards the capital, under fire from Kronborg Castle. On 2 April the Battle of Copenhagen began. Mosse took a leading role, sailing from one end of the line to the other, whilst both firing and receiving fire. He was killed soon after adopting his required position, his last orders being to "cut away the anchor". He was buried at sea.

== Memorials ==
The British government erected a joint monument to Mosse and a second naval hero, Edward Riou, who also fell in the Battle of Copenhagen, in the crypt of St Paul's Cathedral in London. It was sculpted by John Charles Felix Rossi. The grave of his wife (d.1843) and children in Wickham, Hampshire also acts as his memorial.

His will (read September 1801) is held in The National Archives at Kew.
