= HMS Swan (1767) =

Sloop of the Royal Navy

- Swan

History

Great Britain
- Name: HMS Swan
- Ordered: 18 January 1766
- Builder: Plymouth Dockyard
- Laid down: June 1766
- Launched: 21 November 1767
- Commissioned: February 1768
- Fate: Sold September 1814

United Kingdom
- Name: Swan
- Acquired: 1814 by purchase
- Fate: Broken up c.1841

General characteristics
- Class & type: Swan-class
- Tons burthen: 3004/94 bm
- Length: 96 ft 5 in (29.4 m) (gundeck); 78 ft 10 in (24.0 m) (keel)
- Beam: 26 ft 9 in (8.2 m)
- Depth of hold: 12 ft 9 in (3.89 m)
- Complement: 125
- Armament: 14 × 6-pounder guns; 2 more added ca. 1780

HMS Swan was launched on 21 November 1767 at Plymouth as the lead ship of the 24 ships in the 14-gun Swan-class of ship-sloops built in the 1760s and 1770s. She served during the American Revolutionary War and the French Revolutionary War. She bore the name HMS Explosion between 1779 and 1783; at the time she was classed as a fireship. She was laid up in 1801 and finally sold in 1814. Swan then became a whaler in the northern whale fishery, sailing out of Kingston-on-Hull. She also made one voyage to the southern whale fishery (1819–1821) and one merchant voyage to Brazil and Hamburg, before returning to the northern whale fishery. She was broken up circa. 1841.

== Royal Navy ==
American Revolutionary War:December, 1774 under command of Capt. James Ayscough serving in British North America. Swan took Europe and sent her to Cowes around 17 July 1793.

War of the Second Coalition:On 10 April, 1799 under command of Captain Carew, she and frigate HMS Hind captured American merchant sloop "Fair Columbian" off the coast of Florida (29°09′N 78°48′W). Eventually Fair Columbian's crew reasserted control of the ship and brought her into Baltimore.

On 17 January, 1800 USS Warren made contact with sloop of war HMS Swan, Jacob Watson commanding, off Abaco Island operating out of Bermuda.

== Whaler ==
In 1814 Swan became a whaler sailing to the Northern Whale Fishery. She made annual voyages to Greenland or Davis Strait from 1815 to 1819.

=== Northern Whale Fishery ===
Swan, Taylor, master, made five annual voyages between 1815 and 1819. The data below is from Coltish.

Year	Grounds	"Fish" (Whales)	Tuns whale oil
1815	Greenland	6	91
1816	Davis Strait	10	154
1817	Davis Strait	11	165
1818	Davis Strait	4	58
1819	Davis Strait	5	48

=== South Seas Whale Fishery ===
In 1819–1821 Swan made one voyage to the South Seas Whale Fishery. Captain Dring sailed on 2 November 1819, bound for Walvis Bay. Swan returned to Hull on 28 September 1821 with 170 tons of whale oil. The cargo bounty was £500, and the cargo's value was £3420.

Swan then sailed as a merchantman to Brazil. On 4 March 1822 she was at Falmouth, having come from Hull and on her way to Rio de Janeiro. She arrived at Rio on 30 April. On 23 June she was at Bahia. By 12 September she had returned to Deal and on the 17th she sailed for Hambro. She arrived at Cuxhaven on 25 September, and Hambro the next day. She returned to Hull on 22 November.

=== Northern Whale Fishery ===
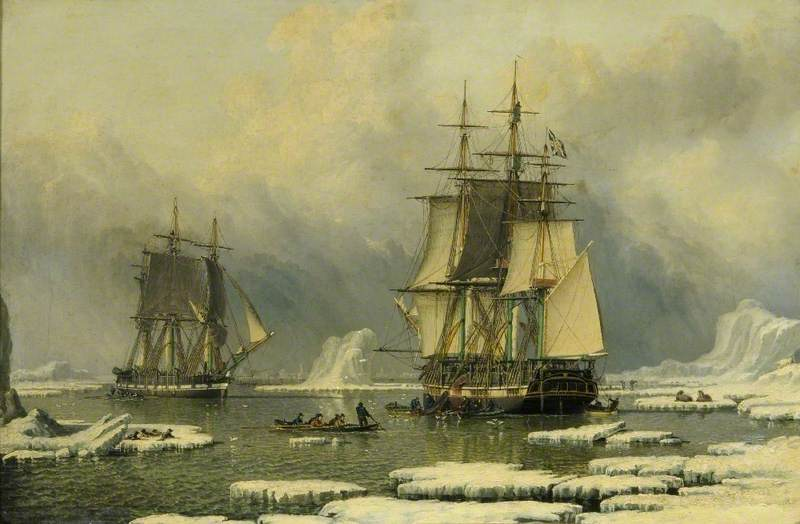
The Swan, and stern view of the Isabella in the Davis Strait, painting by John Ward

Swan, Dring, master, returned to the Northern Whale Fishery in 1823. In 1823 and 1824 she did her whale hunting off Greenland. From 1825 to 1840 she was at Davis Strait. The data below is primarily from Coltish.

Year	Master	"Fish" (Whales)	Tuns whale oil
1823	Dring	12	111
1824	Dring	3	55
1825	Dring	8	120
1826	Dring	11	190
1827	Dring		160
1828	Dring	19	204
1829	Dring	13	195
1830	Dring	0	"Clean"
1831	Dring	6	90
1832	Dring	25	214
1833	Dring	24	196
1834	Dring	19	151
1835	Dring	2	90 butts blubber containing 25 tons of train oil, plus one ton of fins
1836/1837	Dring	3	c.30

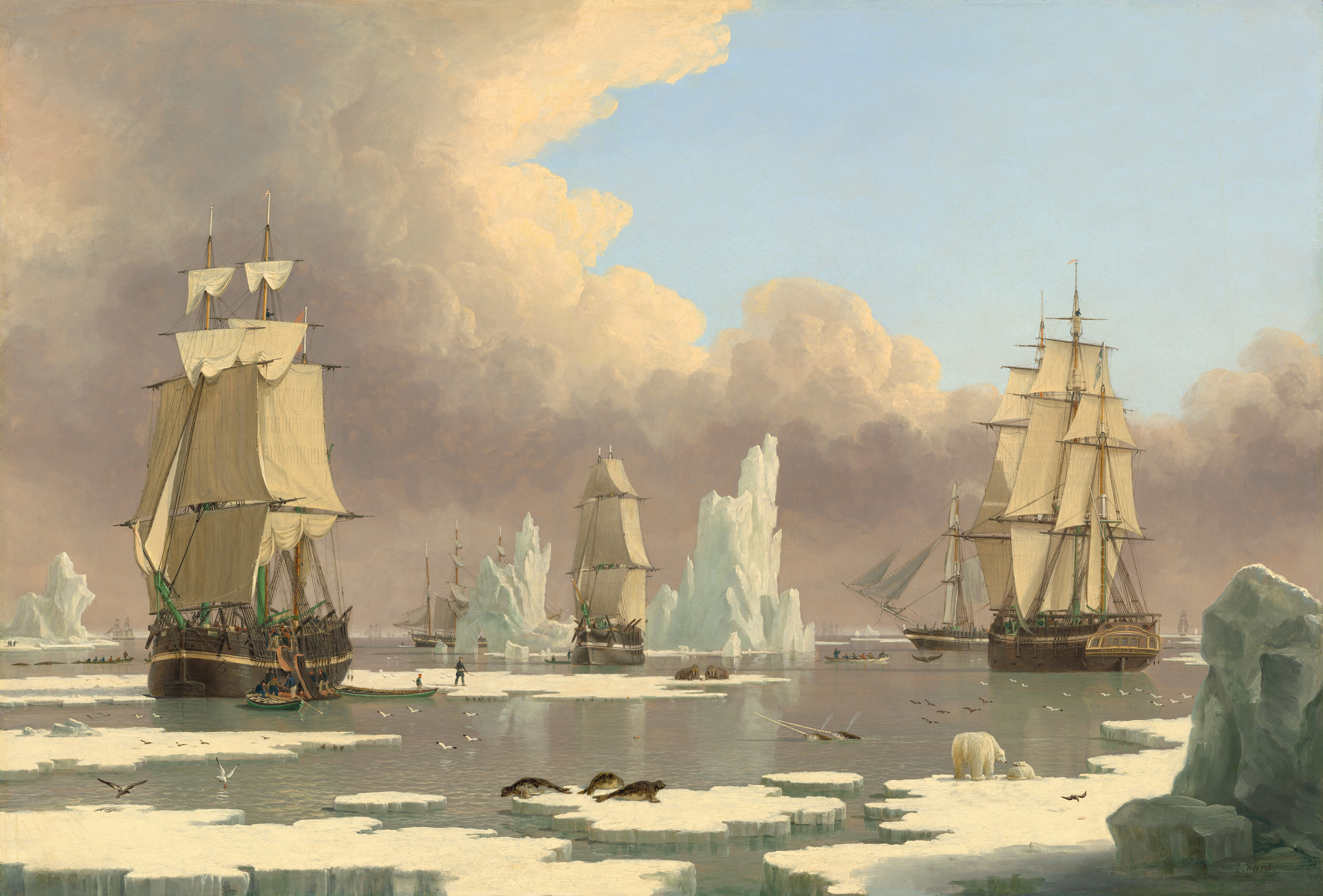
Swan centre

In 1836 Swan, Robert Dring, master, was the last of the Northern Fishery whalers to sail for the fisheries. In October she became ice-bound (beset) and did not get free until spring of 1837. In 1837 she was at Peterhead on 29 June, having gotten free of the ice on 24 May. The first whaler to sight Swan, on 14 May, was William and Ann. Swan was then some 30 miles west of Disco and Captain Stairton's men refused to go to Swan's assistance on the grounds that Swan was far off and they weren't paid to do so. She was only able to get free because the crews of five whalers came upon her and sawed 3000 feet of heavy ice to get her out. The vessels also provided provisions, with one, Charlotte, Adamson, master, being particularly helpful. Then Dunscombe, owned by the same company as Swan, left off her fishing, provided 20 men to fill out Swan's crew, and accompanied her home. Of Swan's crew of 48 men, 20 had died, 14 of them in an attempt to reach a Danish colony in her boats. In addition to the men of her crew who died, five more men also died. Swan had taken on a boat of six men from the wrecked Jane and Mary, of London; of the six, only the mate survived.

On 18 August Swan, Dring, master, sailed from Hull to Petersburg. She returned on 14 November. Such off-season voyages may have been more common than this one instance would suggest.

Year	Master	"Fish" (Whales)	Tuns whale oil
1838	Dring	14	165
1839	Dring	3	Note: Swan also returned with a polar bear she had lassoed in the water
1840	Dring	1	

== Fate ==
Year	Master	Owner	Trade	Source & notes
1840	R.Dring	Cooper & Co.	Hull–Davis Strait; Hull	LR; small repairs 1837 & 1838; "wants repair"

Her entry in LR for 1841 and 1842 carried no trade data. Her entry in the 1842 volume bore the annotation "broken up" beneath her name.
