= 1794 razees =

In 1794, three 64-gun third-rate ships were cut down to 44-gun fifth-rate frigates with a primary armament of 24-pounder guns, in a process known as razeeing. This was in response to rumours then circulating of very large French frigates supposed to be under construction. By Admiralty Order of 11 August 1794, two 64-gun ships of the Intrepid class – Anson and Magnanime – were to be cut down by one deck level. By a subsequent Admiralty Order of 8 September 1794, a third 64-gun ship – the Indefatigable of the Ardent class – which had been launched but never commissioned in 1784, was similarly to be cut down.

The conversion retained the primary armament of twenty-six 24-pounder guns on the gun deck (but this deck became the upper deck rather than the lower deck), while the secondary armament became eight 12-pounder guns and four 32-pounder carronades on the quarterdeck, and four 12-pounder guns and two 32-pounder carronades on the forecastle; the complement was reduced to 310 men.

== Razeed ships of 1794 ==
- HMS Anson
  - Built at: Plymouth Dockyard
  - Launched: 4 January 1781
  - Converted at: Chatham Dockyard
  - Converted: July to December 1794 (for £8,426)
  - Re-rated: 8 October 1794
  - Fate: Wrecked in Mounts Bay 29 December 1807
- HMS Magnanime
  - Built at: Deptford Dockyard
  - Launched: 14 October 1780
  - Converted at: Plymouth Dockyard
  - Converted: June 1794 to February 1795 (for £17,066)
  - Re-rated: 8 November 1794
  - Fate: Broken up at Sheerness Dockyard in July 1813
- HMS Indefatigable
  - Built at: Henry Adams's yard, Bucklers Hard
  - Launched: July 1784
  - Converted at: Portsmouth Dockyard
  - Converted: September 1794 to February 1795 (for £8,764)
  - Rerated: 29 November 1794
  - Fate: Broken up at Sheerness Dockyard in August 1816
