= William Taylor (Royal Navy officer, born 1760) =

Royal Navy Admiral (1760–1842)

Admiral William Taylor
- Born: 1760
- Died: 19 July 1842 (aged 82); Maze Hill, Greenwich
- Military career
- Allegiance: United Kingdom of Great Britain and Ireland
- Branch: Royal Navy
- Service years: prior to 1776 – 1842
- Rank: Admiral of the Red
- Commands: HMS Pelican; HMS Falcon; HMS Cygnet; HMS Thorn; HMS Weazel; HMS Prompte; HMS Andromeda; HMS Magnanime
- Conflicts: American Revolutionary War; French Revolutionary Wars; Capture of Gorée; Napoleonic Wars

William Taylor (1760 – 19 July 1842) was an officer in the Royal Navy who served during the American War of Independence and the French Revolutionary and Napoleonic Wars.

Entering the navy early in his life, Taylor served as a midshipman on Cook's third voyage of discovery. He was promoted shortly after his return to England and commanded ships during the American War of Independence. In common with other officers, he struggled to find employment during the years of peace, but was given a ship to command for a few years in 1788. He was on bad terms with his lieutenant however, and a court-martial ensued. Taylor returned to an active career on the outbreak of the French Revolutionary Wars, still commanding small ships and escorting trade. Promoted to post captain in 1793, he moved to command several frigates in British waters, or as far afield as North America. His later service was on the African coast, where he took part in the capture of Gorée in 1801, and in the Caribbean.

He does not appear to have held any seagoing commands during the Napoleonic Wars, but continued to be promoted, rising to flag rank in 1811. He eventually reached the rank of admiral of the red before his death in 1842. He was by this time the last surviving officer from Cook's third voyage.

== Early career ==
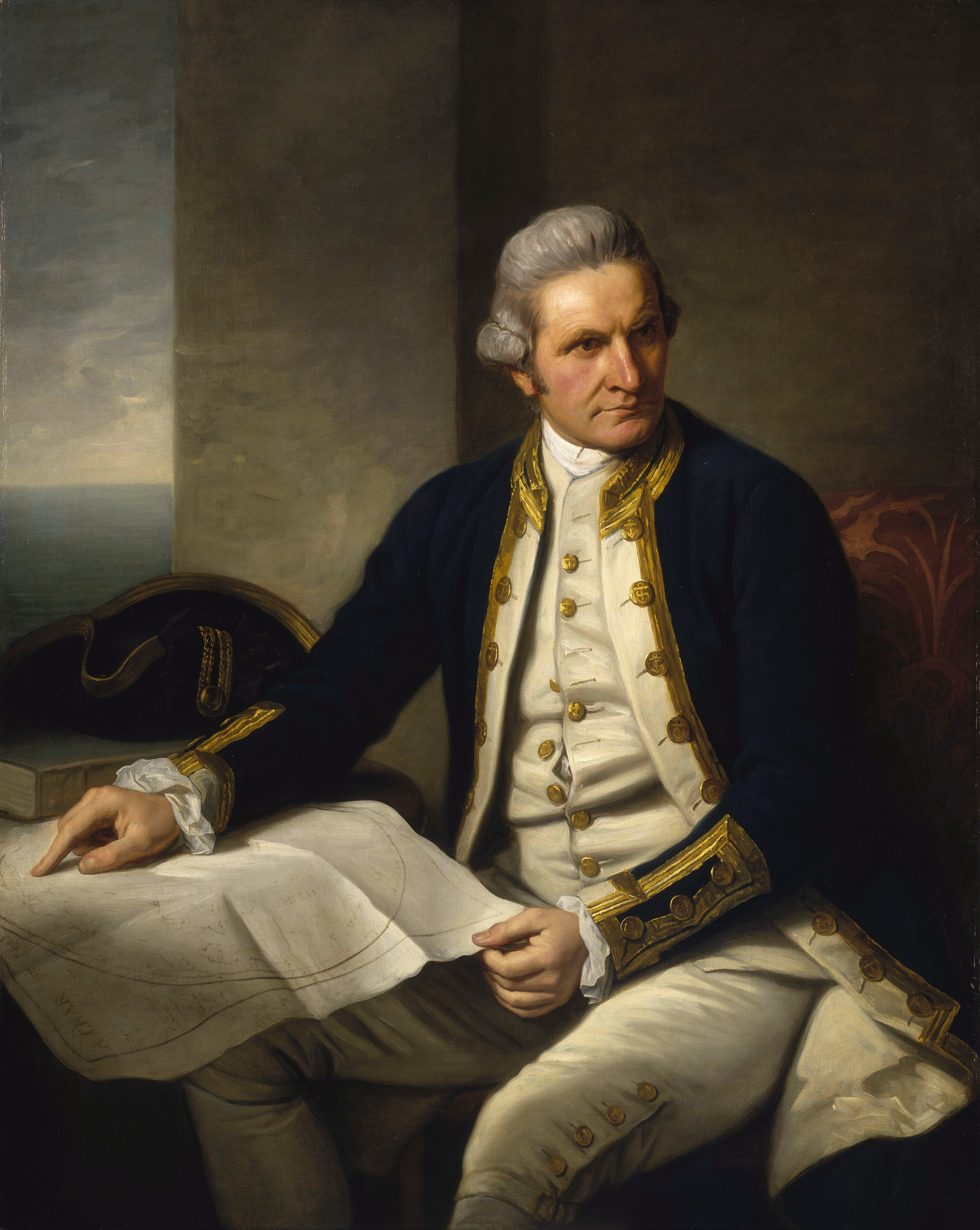
James Cook, portrait by Nathaniel Dance-Holland, c. 1775. Taylor sailed with Cook on Cook's last voyage.

Taylor was born in 1760 and entered the navy at an early age. By 1776 he was a midshipman, and joined Captain James Cook's third voyage of discovery, serving aboard HMS Resolution. He returned with the expedition after Cook's death, and on 28 October 1780 was promoted to lieutenant. The American War of Independence having broken out by now, he saw further service and was soon promoted to commander, on 21 January 1783, and was given command of the brig-sloop HMS Pelican. He also appears to have commissioned the brig-sloop HMS Falcon in May 1783, but if so, the command was short-lived, and she was under another commander by 1784. Taylor instead took command of the 14-gun HMS Cygnet towards the end of the war with America, and remained in command after the peace, until 1786.

Taylor then seems to have spent some time without a ship, before commissioning the 14-gun sloop HMS Thorn in January 1788. His command of Thorn was notable for a court-martial Taylor brought against his lieutenant, a man named Thackeray. Among other charges, Thackeray was alleged to have gone to Taylor, while he was alone in his cabin, and to have called him a "scoundrel" and a "liar". The offence being given in private, the court had only Taylor's word that it was true, creating a brief legal quandary over whether Taylor, who as usual in courts-martial, was acting as the prosecutor, could give evidence on his own behalf, and together with the accused. After some deliberation, Taylor was allowed to give his evidence, as criminal trials such as courts-martial, were adjudged to be on behalf of the Crown, unlike civil prosecutions. Thackeray was subsequently stripped of his rank and reduced to a midshipman. Taylor served in command of Thorn off Shetland until 1790, and paid her off after the period of the Spanish armament had passed.

== French Revolutionary Wars ==
On the outbreak of the French Revolutionary Wars, Taylor commissioned the 12-gun HMS Weazel in April 1794 and served in the English Channel and the North Sea. One of his early tasks was to sail with the Mediterranean Fleet under Lord Hood, and he left Spithead on 22 May 1793. He accompanied the fleet as far as Gibraltar, and then returned, escorting the homeward-bound trade. After this service Taylor was promoted to post-captain on 24 September 1793 and was appointed to command HMS Prompte in November. From Prompte he moved into the 32-gun HMS Andromeda in 1795. Taylor took Andromeda to North America, sailing to Newfoundland and Halifax on 24 May 1796. He returned to cruise in the English Channel and the North Sea between 1797 and 1798. Here on 6 March 1798 he seized the 36-gun Batavian frigate Zefir in the Forth, in company with HMS Kite and HMS Ranger.^{[a]}

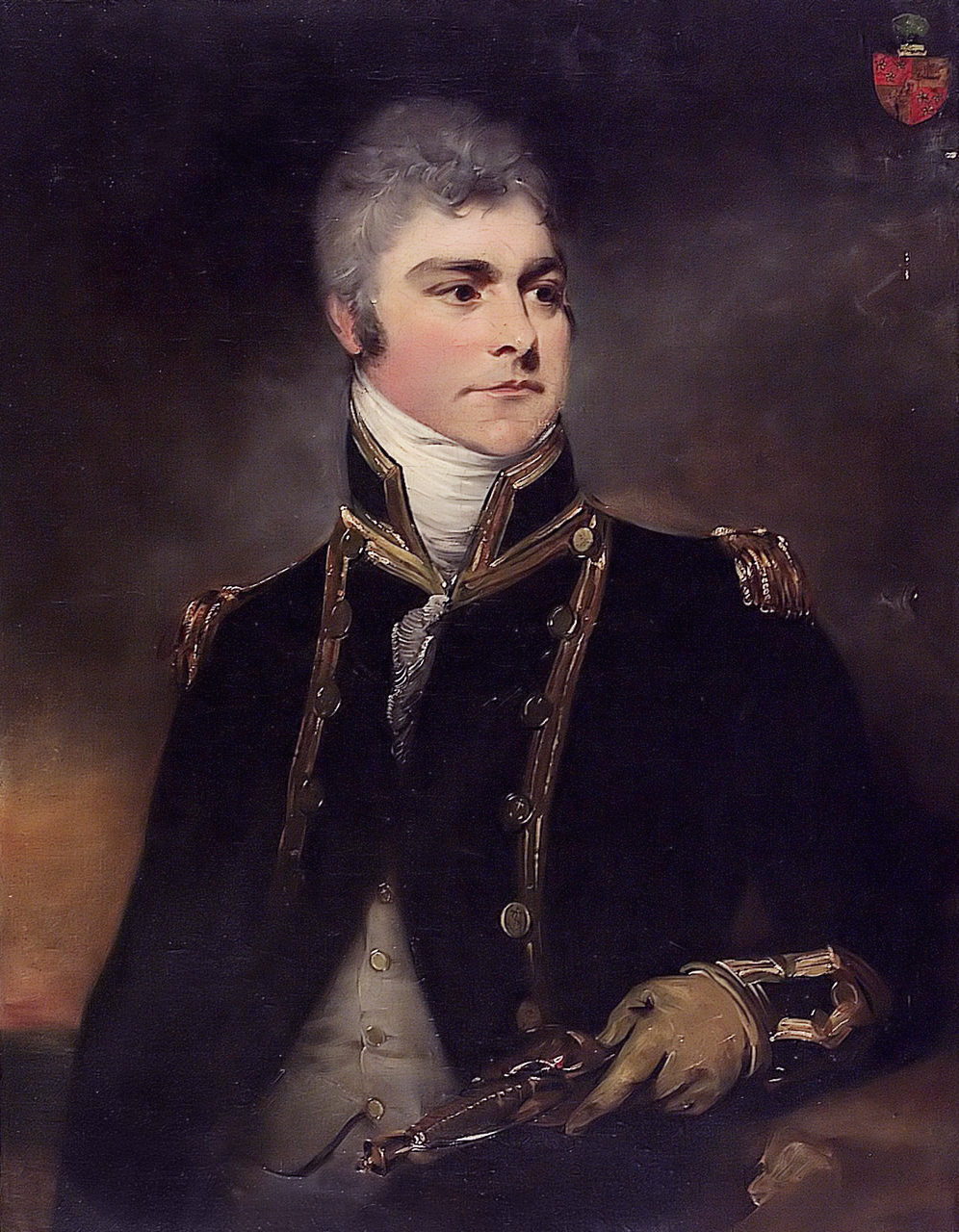
Sir Charles Hamilton, c. 1800, by Sir William Beechey. Taylor served under Hamilton at the capture of Gorée in 1801.

Taylor was given command of the 48-gun HMS Magnanime in spring 1799, succeeding Captain The Hon. Michael de Courcy, and commanded her on African coast. He took part in the capture of Gorée from the French in April 1801, while cruising with a squadron under the command of Captain Sir Charles Hamilton. Hamilton, in command of the 44-gun HMS Melpomene had received intelligence that there were three French frigates at anchor there. Hamilton sailed to investigate, taking with him Taylor in Magnanime, and Captain Solomon Ferris, in command of the 64-gun HMS Ruby. The frigates were not there, so Hamilton summoned the governor and ordered him to surrender. The governor agreed, and Hamilton and his force took possession on 5 April. Taylor was later in the Leeward Islands, where he remained for the rest of the French Revolutionary Wars.

== Family and later life ==
Taylor does not appear to have commanded any further ships during his career, but he continued to be promoted, being advanced to rear-admiral on 1 August 1811, vice-admiral on 12 August 1819 and admiral in 1830. He settled at Greenwich with his wife Isabella and had at least one daughter, Grace, who married William Padwick, squire of Hayling Island, in 1814. In 1846 Rear Admiral David Price was married on Elizabeth Taylor, daughter of Admiral. William Taylor reached the rank of Admiral of the Red before his death on 19 July 1842 at his residence at Maze Hill, Greenwich, at the age of 82. He was by this time the last surviving officer from Cook's third voyage.

== Notes ==
a. Zefir was brought into the service as HMS Eurus, and spent some time as a frigate before being reduced to a storeship. She was broken up in 1834.
