= John Phillimore =

Captain Sir John Phillimore CB
- Born: 18 January 1781
- Died: 21 March 1840 (aged 59); The Ray, near Maidenhead
- Relatives: Henry Bourchier Phillimore (son)
- Military career
- Allegiance: United Kingdom of Great Britain and Ireland
- Branch: Royal Navy
- Service years: 1794 – 1840
- Rank: Captain
- Commands: HMS Cormorant; HMS Belette; HMS Marlborough; HMS Diadem; HMS Eurotas; HMS William and Mary; HMS Thetis
- Conflicts: French Revolutionary Wars; Battle of Cape St Vincent; Battle of Copenhagen; Napoleonic Wars; Battle of Copenhagen; First Anglo-Ashanti War
- Awards: Companion of the Order of the Bath

Sir John Phillimore CB (18 January 1781 – 21 March 1840) was an officer of the Royal Navy who saw service during the French Revolutionary and Napoleonic Wars. He was involved in several notable actions during his active career, taking part in both Battles of Copenhagen, sending Sir Hyde Parker's famous signal to Nelson in the first, and fighting off Danish gunboats in the second. He went on to win a hard-fought victory over a French frigate in 1814 and reaped the rewards. He was at times a controversial figure, causing a scandal when he thrashed the naval historian William James with a stick for apparently badly representing Phillimore's conduct, and on another occasion inviting rebuke from the Navy Board for his request for more paint for his ship. He nevertheless became an aide-de-camp to the young Queen Victoria, and took important steps to reform how the lower ranks and ordinary seamen were treated in the Navy.

== Family and early life ==
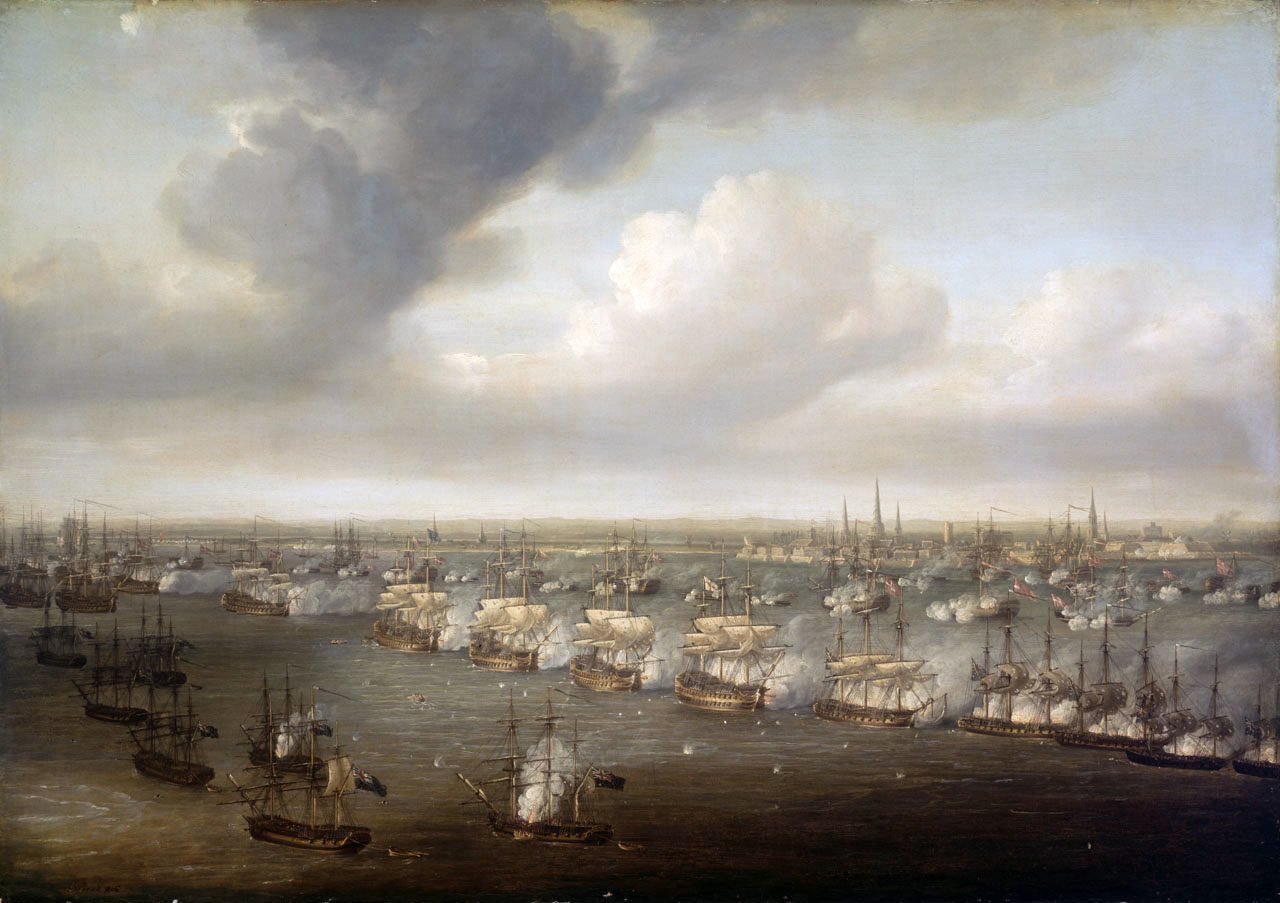
Nicholas Pocock's depiction of the Battle of Copenhagen. Phillimore sent to signal for Nelson to withdraw, prompting his famous response.

Phillimore was born on 18 January 1781, the third son of the Reverend Joseph Phillimore, the rector of Orton on the Hill, Leicestershire, and his wife Mary. His naval service began when he joined Captain George Murray's 36-gun frigate HMS Nymphe as a volunteer first class in June 1794. Phillimore was present at the Battle of Groix on 23 June 1795 as a midshipman, before both he and Murray moved aboard the 74-gun HMS Colossus. They fought at the Battle of Cape St Vincent, and after surviving the wreck of the Colossus in St Mary's harbour, Isles of Scilly, were briefly aboard HMS Achille, before moving again aboard HMS Edgar.

Phillimore and the Edgar went with Sir Hyde Parker's fleet for his expedition to the Baltic in 1801. During the Battle of Copenhagen Phillimore had been sent to Parker's flagship, the 90-gun HMS London to take his examination. He served as the London's acting-signal lieutenant during the battle, sending Parker's famous signal for Nelson to withdraw. Nelson, directing action aboard HMS Elephant, was informed of the signal by the signal lieutenant, Frederick Langford, but angrily responded: 'I told you to look out on the Danish commodore and let me know when he surrendered. Keep your eyes fixed on him.' He then turned to his flag captain, Thomas Foley, and said 'You know, Foley, I have only one eye. I have a right to be blind sometimes.' He raised the telescope to his blind eye, and said 'I really do not see the signal.' Phillimore returned to the Edgar after the battle, where he learnt that the Edgar's first lieutenant had been killed in the engagement. A round of general promotions of the junior officers followed, and Phillimore was promoted to lieutenant.

== Command ==
Phillimore remained in the Baltic, serving briefly aboard the London again, before moving aboard the 80-gun HMS Spartiate and serving with Murray off Cádiz. With the Peace of Amiens Phillimore was appointed as first lieutenant of the brig-sloop HMS Gannet, being promoted to commander on 10 May 1804. He received his first command, that of the 20-gun HMS Cormorant, in October 1805. He commanded Cormorant in the North Sea until September 1806, when he was moved to take command of the 18-gun HMS Belette. He commanded her in the English Channel and the Downs, taking part in Commodore Edward Owen's attack on Bolougne. The Belette was occupied in early 1807 with conveying supplies to the besieged town of Kolberg, after which she was attached to Admiral James Gambier's fleet which returned to the Baltic to attack Copenhagen again in 1807. Phillimore distinguished himself during the battle, particularly in an engagement at the end of August, when the Belette became becalmed off the Danish coast. She was attacked by 16 Danish gunboats, of which Phillimore managed to sink three before other British ships arrived and towed him clear. Gambier rewarded his courage by giving him the honour of carrying his despatches to the Admiralty, as a result of which he received a promotion to post captain on 13 October 1807.

=== Belette and the Baltic ===
Phillimore initially remained in command of the Belette, returning to the Baltic in late 1807. He brought the British ambassador, Lord Hutchinson back to Britain in February 1808. At some point while sailing to Gothenburg he had the misfortune to encounter the only two decker in the Danish Navy, which he escaped by sailing into shallower waters. Promotion eventually left him without a ship however, though he temporarily took over command of the 74-gun HMS Marlborough in June 1809 with the temporary absence of her captain, Graham Moore. He took part in the Walcheren Campaign until Moore's return to command in late 1809. Phillimore's next command was the nominally 64-gun HMS Diadem, though she had been converted into a troopship some years earlier and by the time Phillimore became her captain in June 1810, she only mounted 32 guns.

=== "No longer your affectionate friend" ===
This was to lead to a celebrated exchange of letters between Phillimore and the Navy Board on the subject of paint. With the Diadem now only mounting 32 guns, the board directed that she should receive stores equivalent to a ship of this rating, despite her much larger size and complement, and despite Phillimore's protests. Consequently, he only received money for enough paint to paint half his ship. Phillimore sent a pointed letter to the board enquiring which half they wished him to paint, the starboard side or the larboard side. He then signed the letter "your affectionate friend". The board admonished him for this, pointing out that the custom of signing "your affectionate friend" was one practised by its own members and was the address used from a superior officer to an inferior one. Phillimore acknowledged his mistake, signing himself "no longer your affectionate friend". The correspondence appears to have had its effect; the allowance was duly doubled. Phillimore spent his time in command of the Diadem carrying troops to and from the Iberian peninsula, supporting Arthur Wellesley's operations there.

=== HMS Eurotas and the Clorinde ===
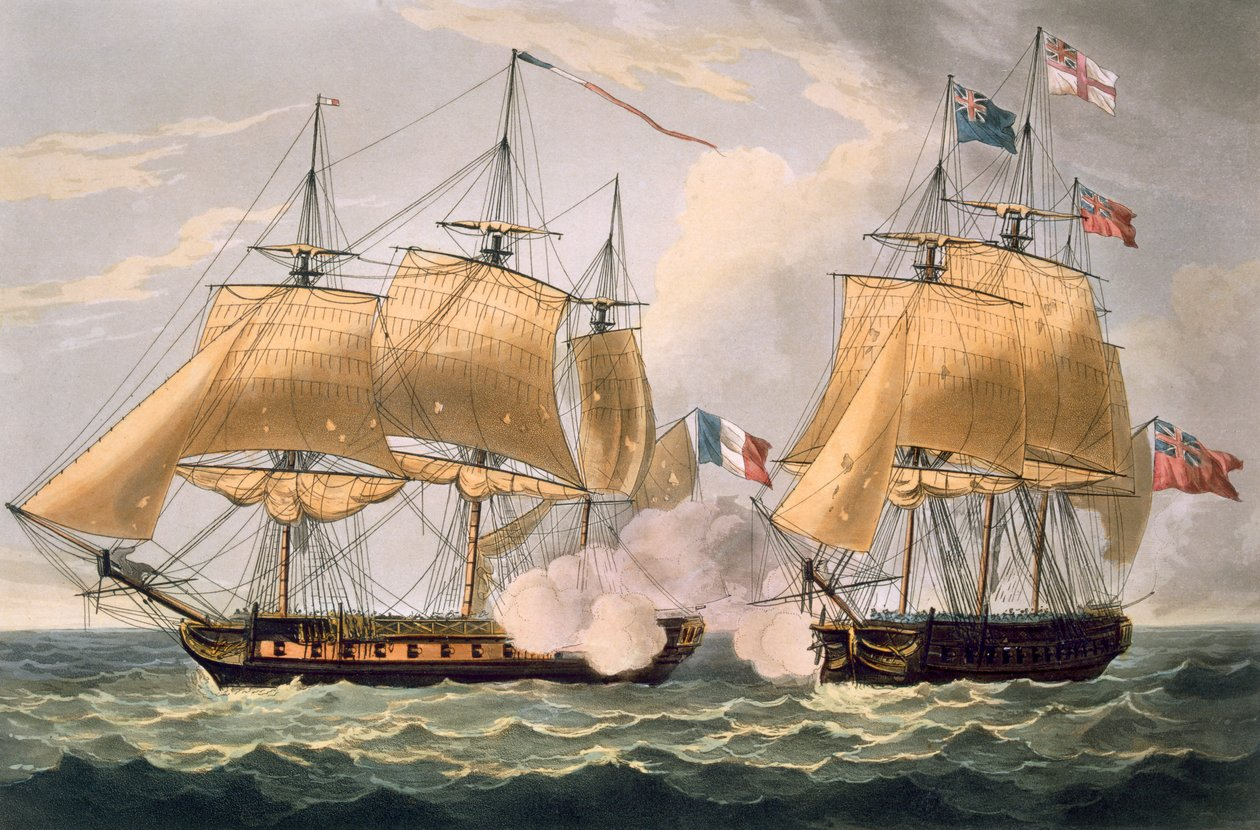
HMS Eurotas fights the Clorinde, shown in a print by Thomas Whitcombe

On 4 May 1813 Phillimore received command of the new 38-gun frigate HMS Eurotas, which had been armed with an experimental mix of guns to a design by Sir William Congreve. The Eurotas was initially attached to the fleet blockading Brest, and on 23 October Phillimore was present at the capture of the Franco-Dutch frigate Trave. In January 1814 Eurotas was despatched to Lorient, where three French frigates had been reported as preparing to put to sea. They escaped to sea under cover of night and heavy weather, and despite pursuing them for three days, Phillimore was eventually forced to return to Britain to re-provision. She returned to sea again, and on 25 February came across the French frigate Clorinde.

A long and sustained battle was fought, which eventually left Eurotas totally dismasted, and with 20 of her men killed and 40 wounded, with Phillimore among the latter. Eurotas's first lieutenant took over while Phillimore was carried below to be seen by the surgeon. A jury-rig was erected and the chase resumed during the night. The Clorinde had also been badly damaged during the engagement, losing 40 killed and 80 wounded, and was steadily being overtaken by the Eurotas, when two British ships came upon the scene, HMS Dryad and HMS Achates. Dryad brought Clorinde to with a single shot and the Frenchman surrendered. In 1847 the Admiralty authorized the issuance of the Naval General Service Medal with clasp "EUROTAS 25 FEBY. 1814" to all still surviving members of Eurota's crew that had participated in the action.

== Later service ==
Phillimore was nominated a Companion of the Bath on 4 June 1815, but his wounds prevented him from returning to active service for some years. He finally returned to sea with his appointment to command the yacht William and Mary on 13 April 1820, which was then in service as the conveyance of Earl Talbot, the Lord Lieutenant of Ireland. Talbot knighted him for his services on 12 December 1821. Phillimore next received command of the 46-gun frigate HMS Thetis in March 1823, and was sent to Mexico to convey a commission of political enquiry, and to the West Indies, and later on to Africa, South America and the Mediterranean. He made a large sum of money by returning with valuable cargoes to Britain in 1824, including $400,000 of specie and 300 bales of cochineal from Havana.

=== Assault on William James ===
While on leave in Britain that year his attention was drawn to a passage recently published in William James's Naval History of Great Britain, which described the battle between Eurotas and Clorinde. In it James had noted that the 24-pounders had not done as much as had 18-pounders in other actions, and that Eurotas had been in commission long enough for her crew 'to have been taught a few practical rules of gunnery'. A furious Phillimore considered this a slur on his character and took 48 hours' leave to go up to London. He and a friend went to James's house and upon meeting him, Phillimore declared that the account of the battle was false. James defended his book, and harsh words were exchanged, which led to Phillimore thrashing James with his stick. The case was examined by a magistrate and Phillimore was forced to pay James £100 in damages.

=== The bishop of St Michael's ===
Phillimore continued to serve in the navy, carrying troops of the Royal African Corps to Cape Coast Castle during the First Anglo-Ashanti War in 1824. On the return voyage he stopped to re-provision at St Michael's in August. The English residents of the settlement asked Phillimore to have the burial ground there consecrated, a task he delegated to his ship's chaplain, to be carried out the next day at noon. The chaplain pointed out that consecrations could only be carried out by a bishop. Phillimore responded by appointing the chaplain 'acting-bishop of St Michael's', and the consecration was duly carried out.

=== Defying the Spanish ===
The Thetis was in the Mediterranean the following year, transporting the English ambassador to Naples to his post. On the return voyage she put into Gibraltar, shortly after a gale had driven 17 British merchants ashore at the head of the bay. The Spanish governor of the area claimed jurisdiction and the right of salvage over them, but Phillimore took his boats out and drove off the Spanish forces that had attempted to take possession over them. This precedent helped to define the rights and jurisdictions of the British forces in Gibraltar and Phillimore received letters of thanks from the merchants at Gibraltar, and from Lloyd's of London for saving the cargoes.

=== Naval reform ===
Phillimore also embarked on a significant piece of naval reform, when after consulting with his men, he reduced their rum ration by half, with the money saved being paid into their wages. The positive effects of this were so noticeable that this reform was soon adopted throughout the Navy. Another improvement Phillmore introduced was the paying of a monthly advance in wages.

The Thetis was paid off in November 1826, and Phillmore never again served at sea. He was however appointed a naval aide-de-camp to King William IV in September 1831, a position he retained under Queen Victoria.

== Family life ==
John Phillimore married Catherine Harriet Raigersfeld on 17 February 1830, when he was 49. The couple settled near Maidenhead and had two sons and four daughters. His youngest son, Henry Bouchier Phillimore, became an admiral. John Phillimore died on 21 March 1840 at the age of 59, and was buried at Bray. His wife died a few months later and was buried beside him.
