= HMS Magnanime (1780) =

Frigate of the Royal Navy

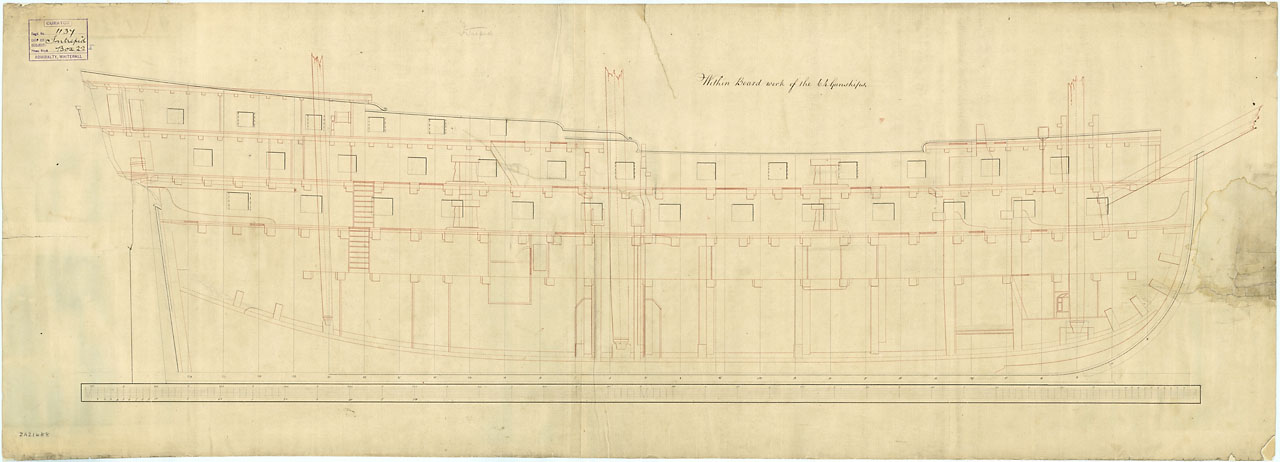
- Magnanime

History

Great Britain
- Name: HMS Magnanime
- Namesake: HMS Magnanime (1748)
- Ordered: 16 October 1775
- Builder: Deptford Dockyard
- Laid down: 23 August 1777
- Launched: 14 October 1780
- Commissioned: October 1780
- Fate: Broken up at Sheerness Dockyard, July 1813
- Notes: Razeed to a 44-gun fifth rate, 1795

General characteristics
- Class & type: Intrepid-class ship of the line
- Tons burthen: 1369 51/94 bm
- Length: 159 ft 6 in (48.62 m) (gundeck); 131 ft 6 in (40.08 m) (keel)
- Beam: 44 ft 4 in (13.51 m)
- Depth of hold: 19 ft (5.8 m)
- Propulsion: Sails
- Sail plan: Full-rigged ship
- Complement: 500 (as 64-gun ship); 310 officers and men (as frigate)
- Armament: As third rate: Gundeck: 26 × 24-pounder guns; Upper gundeck: 26 × 18-pounder guns; QD: 10 × 4-pounder guns; Forecastle: 2 × 9-pounder guns

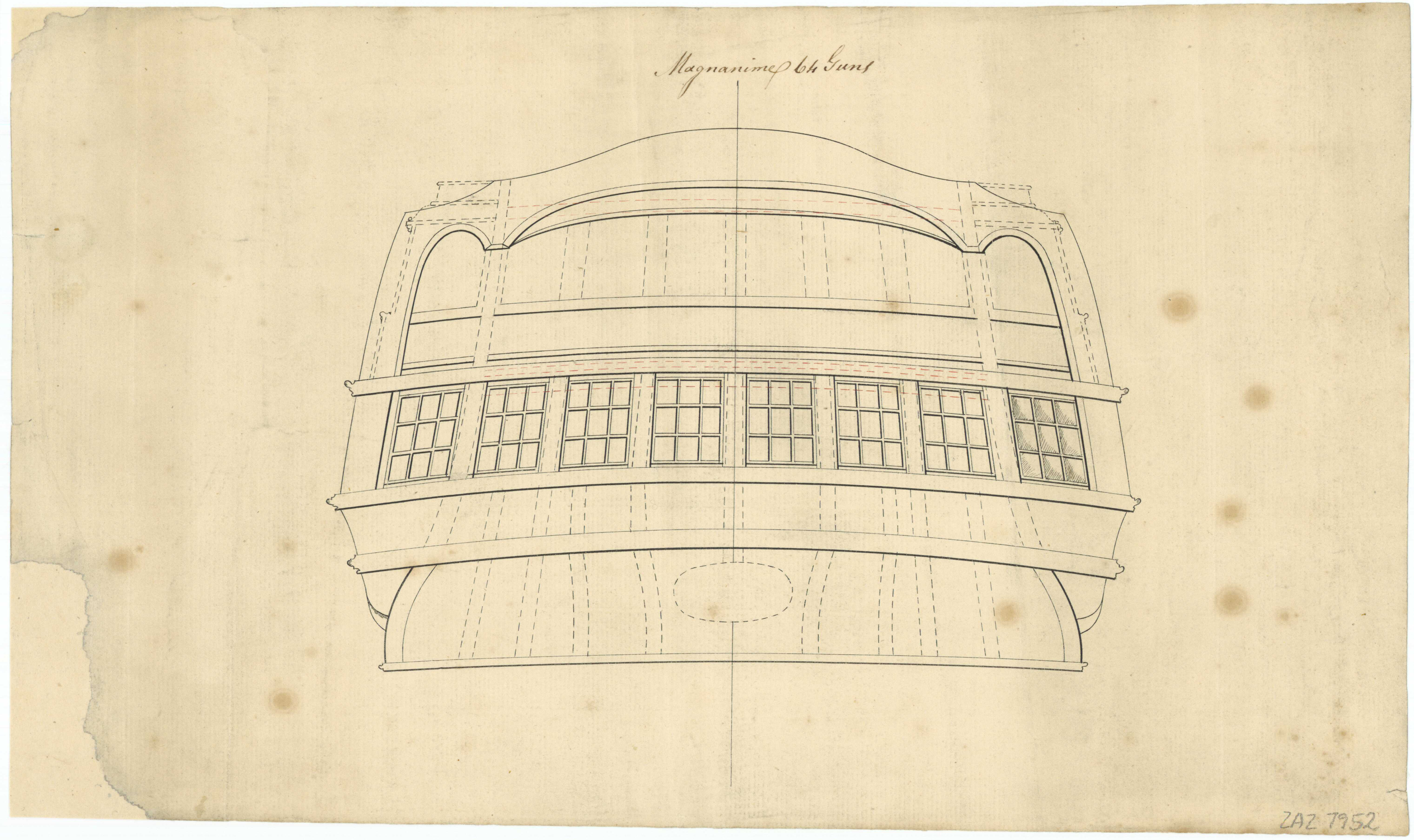
Magnanime

HMS Magnanime was a 64-gun third-rate ship of the line of the Royal Navy, launched on 14 October 1780 at Deptford Dockyard. She belonged to the Intrepid class designed by Sir John Williams and later was razeed into a 44 gun frigate.

== Career ==
Commissioned in October 1780 under Captain Charles Wolseley, Magnanime sailed in 1781 with the Relief Expedition to Gibraltar, and subsequently to the Indian Ocean, where she participated in several of the series of battles against French forces off India – including those of Providien, Negapatam and Trincomalee in 1782 and Cuddalore in 1783. She returned to the United Kingdom and paid off into ordinary in June 1784.

From 1794 to 1795, she was cut down into a 44-gun razee fifth-rate frigate and recommissioned in November 1794 under Captain Isaac Schomberg.

On 16 March 1798 Magnanime was escorting a small convoy when she spied a privateer lurking about, seeking an opportunity to pick off a prize. Captain The Hon. Michael de Courcy set Magnanime in chase. Twenty-three hours and 256 miles later, he captured Eugénie at Latitude 42 and Longitude 12. She was armed with 18 guns, eight of which she had thrown overboard during the chase, and had a crew of 107 men. She was coppered and appeared completely new. The Royal Navy took her into service under the name HMS Pandour, but never commissioned her.

On 1 April Magnanime was again involved in a successful chase. This time one of 180 miles in 18 hours. The captured privateer was the Audacieux, of 20 guns, though pierced for 22, and carrying a crew of 137 men. She too was coppered and new. de Courcy remarked that Audacieuz was so fast that if her captain had done a better job of steering she would have escaped. She was taken into the Royal Navy as HMS Audacieux but apparently was never commissioned.

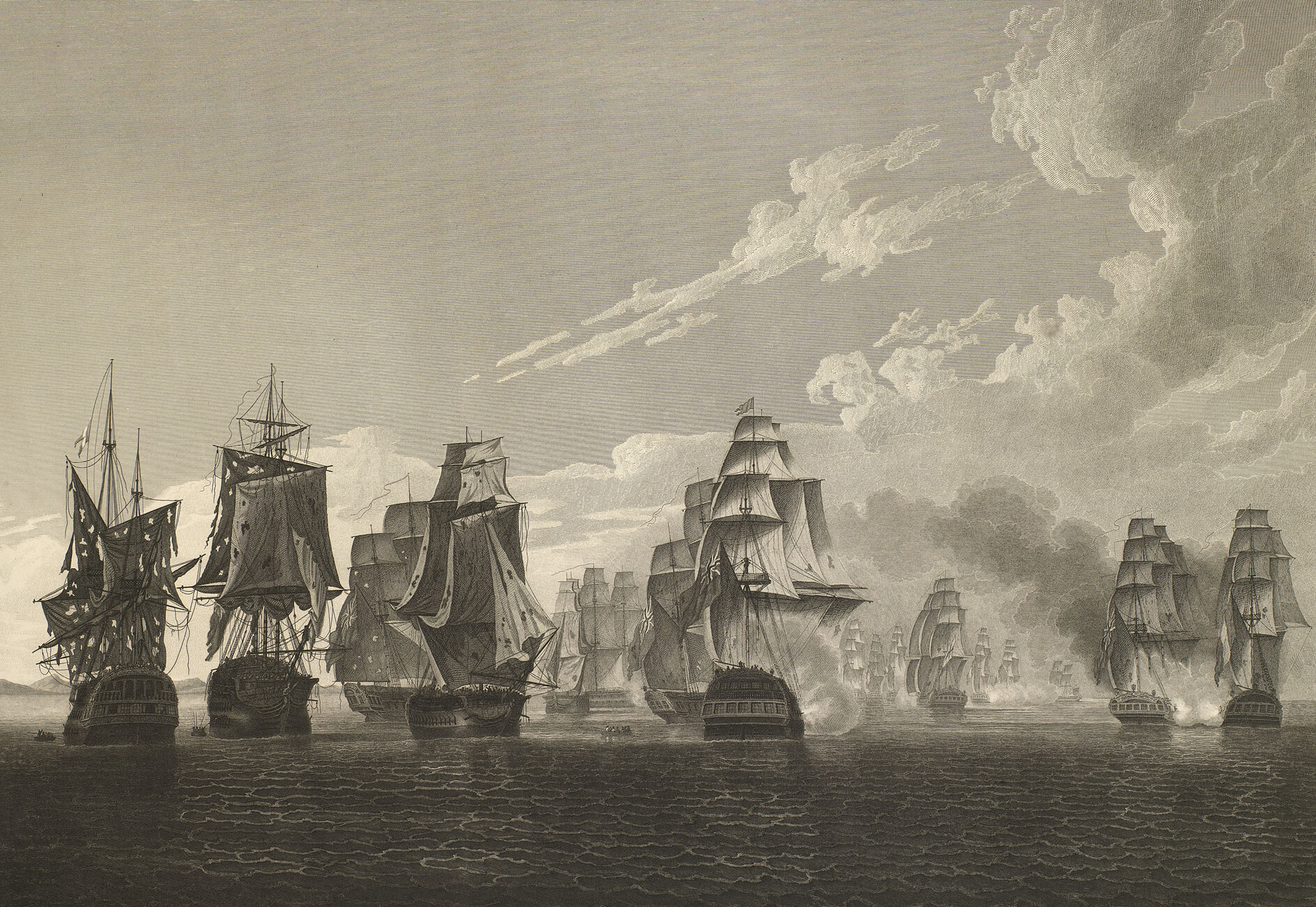
Magnanime at the Battle of Tory Island

Magnanime passed under the command of Captain William Taylor in spring 1799, and commanded her on African coast. Sometime in January, 1801, possibly 17 or 18 January she exchanged fire in the night with USS Constellation until identities were established, with the few shots fired with no material damage being done to either. He took part in the capture of Gorée from the French in April 1801, while cruising with a squadron under the command of Captain Sir Charles Hamilton. Hamilton, in command of the 44-gun HMS Melpomene had received intelligence that there were three French frigates at anchor there. Hamilton sailed to investigate, taking with him Taylor in Magnanime, and Captain Solomon Ferris, in command of the 64-gun HMS Ruby. The frigates were not there, so Hamilton summoned the governor and ordered him to surrender. The governor agreed, and Hamilton and his force took possession on 5 April. Magnanime was later in the Leeward Islands, where she remained for the rest of the French Revolutionary Wars, paying off into ordinary again in 1802.

During the Napoleonic Wars she served in a variety of ancillary capacities – as a floating battery, then as a hospital ship.

== Fate ==
Magnanime was eventually broken up in July 1813.
