= Baltimore (1810 ship) =

US cargo ship launched in 1810

History

United States
- Name: Baltimore
- Owner: Peter Arnold Karthaus
- Builder: Talbot County, Maryland
- Launched: 1810
- Captured: 1812

General characteristics
- Tons burthen: 226, or 240 (bm)
- Length: 97 ft (30 m)
- Beam: 24 ft 6 in (7.5 m)
- Sail plan: Schooner
- Complement: 33, or 48
- Armament: 4 × 4-pounder guns + 4 × 4-pounder carronades

Baltimore was launched in Maryland in 1810. She was commissioned at Baltimore as a letter of marque on 26 August 1812. Captain Edward Veasey sailed on 12 September with a cargo for Bordeaux. (Note: By one report, on her way Baltimore detained the schooner Dorcas. Veasey removed the drygoods on Dorcas and released her. However, other reports attribute the incident to Liberty.)

Then on 28 September Baltimore captured Point Share, which had been sailing from Barbados to Newfoundland with a cargo of dried codfish. Veasey took Point Share's master and crew on board Baltimore and sent his prize into Baltimore with a prize crew. Point Shares arrived at Baltimore on 20 October. By then, Baltimore herself had already fallen prey to the Royal Navy.

In early October Baltimore was in the Bay of Biscay, near Santander when on 7 October she encountered a British naval squadron, which captured her. The report of her capture noted that she was carrying coffee, sugar, and hides. Lloyd's List reported that she had arrived at Portsmouth on 1 November. It also reported that she was a prize to HMS Diadem.

In 1813 Edward Veasey became captain of the even more unfortunate privateer Tartar. Then in 1814 he became captain of the privateer schooner Lawrence, which captured 22 vessels.
