= HMS Mutine (1825) =

Cherokee-class brig-sloop

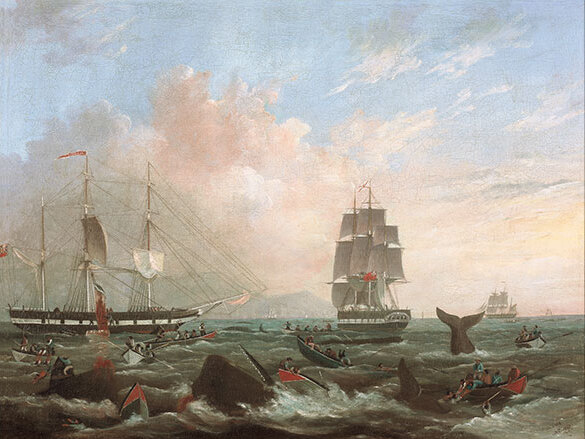
- Offshore whaling with the Aladdin (left) and Jane (right); William Duke, 1849, Tasmanian Museum and Art Gallery

History

United Kingdom
- Name: HMS Mutine
- Ordered: 23 May 1820
- Builder: Plymouth
- Laid down: April 1822
- Launched: 19 May 1825
- Fate: Sold 27 May 1841

United Kingdom
- Name: Aladdin
- Owner: 1841:Bennet & Co.; 1846:Charles Seal; 1860:George McArthur; 1882:Tasmanian government
- Acquired: 1841 by purchase
- Fate: Broken up 1902

General characteristics
- Class & type: Cherokee-class brig-sloop
- Tons burthen: Old formula: 231 (bm); New formula:287 (bm)
- Length: Overall: 90 ft 0 in (27.43 m); Keel: 72 ft 4 in (22.05 m)
- Beam: 24 ft 8 in (7.52 m)
- Depth of hold: 11 ft 0 in (3.35 m)
- Propulsion: Sails
- Complement: Sloop-of-war:75
- Armament: Sloop-of-war:2 × 6-pounder chase guns + 8 × 18-pounder carronades; Packet:6 guns

HMS Mutine was launched on 19 May 1825 at Plymouth, England as a Cherokee-class brig-sloop. She became a Falmouth packet until the navy sold her in 1841. She then became the whaler Aladdin, sailing first out of England and then out of Hobart. The government in Tasmania purchased her in 1885 to use as a powder hulk. It sold her in 1902 for breaking up.

== Career ==
Falmouth packet: In September 1826 Mutine was at Devonport being fitted out for the packet trade out of Falmouth. Thereafter she served for many years under the command of Lieutenant Richard Pawle.

In addition to sailing between Falmouth and North America, Mutine made voyages to the Mediterranean and to the West Indies. On 8 March 1827 Lloyd's List reported that Mutine had arrived at Falmouth from the Mediterranean having observed a fleet of Turkish warships off Cephalonia.

In August 1832 Mutine brought back to England 17,000 dollars salvaged from Thetis. Thetis had wrecked on 5 December 1830 off Cape Frio, Brazil. She had been carrying a cargo of bullion, two-thirds of which had subsequently been salvaged.

Disposal: The "Commissioners for executing the office of Lord High Admiral of the United Kingdom of Great Britain and Ireland" offered Mutine, of 10 guns and 231 tons (bm), for sale on 13 May 1841. She did not sell and they offered her again on 27 May. She was sold on that day, without stores, for £740.

Whaler: Messrs. Bennett of London purchased her and converted her into a whaler they named Aladdin. She first appeared in Lloyd's Register in 1841 with Bull, master, Bennett, owner, and trade London–South Seas.

Aladdin made one voyage for the Bennetts. Aladdin, J. Boon, master, sailed from England on 23 February 1842. The vessel was reported at anchor in a bay near Kupang, Timor in October 1842, with 16 barrels of whale oil aboard, where she had come to obtain provisions, which were "abundant and cheap." She returned to England on 15 June 1846 with 278 casks of sperm oil and two casks of train oil, representing some 116 tons of oil.

In 1846 the Hobart entrepreneur, Charles Seal, sent one of his employees, Captain George McArthur, to London to purchase a replacement for one of his whalers recently lost at sea. McArthur purchased Aladdin and departed London on 5 September 1846. Aladdin reached Hobart on 15 January 1847 with 50 barrels of oil, having done a little fishing along the way.

On 18 December 1848. Aladdin became the stage for an unusual entertainment for the people of Hobart.

Mr Quinn, the celebrated rope-walker, assayed to walk up the fore-top and main topmast stays of the Aladdin yesterday afternoon, but after accomplishing half the distance, he was obliged to defer the feat until another day, the weather being very boisterous, and the ship rocking the whole time.

Aladdin made 31 whaling voyages out of Hobart. In 1860 Captain McArthur purchased her for £500. She was recoppered in 1867, when a cannonball was discovered embedded in the wood beneath her old copper skins.

Also in 1867 McArthur had forcibly to suppress a mutiny. He died in 1875 but the ship's new owners continued sailing Aladdin as a whaler. Her owners sold her to the Tasmanian government in 1885 or 1892 (sources differ).

Powder hulk: The Tasmanian Government purchased Aladdin to use as a powder hulk and anchored her in the River Derwent in Hobart. During the 1898 celebration of the centenary of the Battle of the Nile she was decorated with flags, as it was mistakenly believed that she was the French brig La Mutine, renamed HMS Mutine, which had served during that engagement. (Note: Actually, that Mutine had been captured at the Battle of Santa Cruz de Tenerife. With a burthen of 350 tons, she was much larger than Aladdin. She also had been sold in 1803.)

== Fate ==
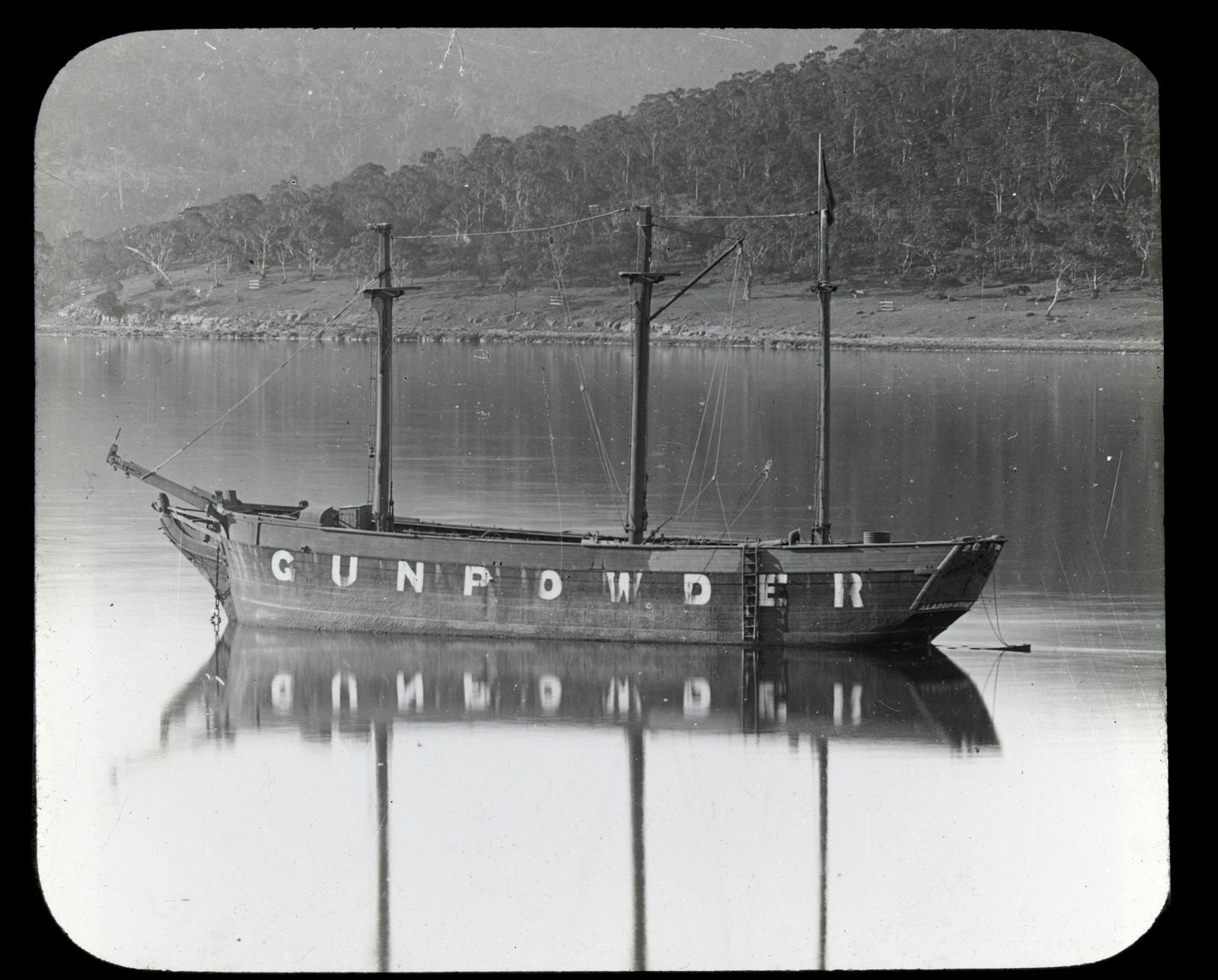
Aladdin, ex HMS Mutine as a powder hulk on the Derwent river, Tasmania, scrapped in 1902

Aladdin was sold for breaking up in 1902.
