= Tartar (1813 privateer) =

History

United States
- Name: Tartar
- Owner: James & William Bosley (of New York)
- Builder: Talbot County, Maryland
- Launched: 1813
- Commissioned: 7 December 1813
- Fate: Wrecked 20 or 22 December 1813

General characteristics
- Tons burthen: 276 (bm)
- Length: 102 ft 6 in (31.2 m)
- Beam: 25 ft (7.6 m)
- Depth of hold: 10 ft (3.0 m)
- Sail plan: Schooner
- Complement: 47 men (Note: When Tartar sailed she had only 47 men aboard as so many privateers had recently left Baltimore there was a shortage of seamen. She gathered some more crew by calling at various ports as she cruised.)
- Armament: 4 × 18-pounder + 6 × 9-pounder guns (Note: A British account of her destruction reported her armament as 18 guns.)

Tartar was an unsuccessful American privateer schooner during the War of 1812. She was launched in 1813 and was driven ashore and destroyed on her maiden voyage at the end of the year, not having captured anything.

== Career ==
Tartar was launched in late 1813 and reportedly cost her owners $50,000, or $21/ton to build. Captain Edward Veazy (or Veasey, or Veazey) took command a few days after 9 November, and received his letter of marque one month later. (Note: In 1812 Veasey was captain of the letter-of-marque Baltimore, which the Royal Navy captured in October.) (Note: Emmons conflates this Tartar with an earlier, New York-based schooner of 160 tons (bm).) Tartar was commissioned on 6 December 1813, and received commission no.921.

She had been out two weeks when a fierce storm on 20 December drove her on an off-shore bank near Cape Henry, Virginia. Six of her crew froze to death before the survivors could reach shore the next morning. Tartar, in company with several other vessels, had been attempting to use the blizzard to get past the blockade. The death toll might have been greater had her owners not equipped, voluntarily and at their own expense, the crew with heavy winter clothing even though Tartar was not heading for northern waters.

American accounts report that Royal Navy brigs came up on the morning of the 22nd and started firing on the survivors on shore and the two companies of Virginia militia that had arrived on the scene. By evening the Americans could no longer hold off the British, who sent in boats to destroy Tartar. British records credit the 74-gun HMS Dragon, Captain Robert Barrie, with destroying her on 22 December. (Note: Head money was finally paid in June 1829. A first-class share (i.e., Barrie's), was worth £72 18s 6½d; a sixth-class share, that of an ordinary seaman, was worth 4s 2½d.)
