= Eugénie (1793 ship) =

History

France
- Name: Eugénie
- Builder: Nantes
- Launched: 1793 (Note: Winfield gives her launch year as 1793, but his earlier description gives the launch year as 1798. His more recent book, with S. Roberts, gives the year as 1793.)
- Acquired: March 1794 (requisitioned)
- Decommissioned: February 1796
- Captured: 16 March 1798

Great Britain
- Name: HMS Pandour or Pandora
- Acquired: March 1798 by capture
- Renamed: HMS Wolf in 1800
- Fate: Broken up 1802

General characteristics
- Type: Brig
- Displacement: 300 tons
- Tons burthen: 24327/94 (bm)
- Length: 85 ft 10 in (26.2 m) (overall); 67 ft 9 1/4 in (20.7 m) (keel)
- Beam: 25 ft 11 3/4 in (7.9 m)
- Depth of hold: 11 ft 11 in (3.6 m)
- Propulsion: Sails
- Sail plan: Brig
- Complement: French privateer: 100-110; French Navy:95-105; Royal Navy: 86
- Armament: Originally:16 × 6-pounder guns + 12 swivel guns; 1795: 2 × 6-pounder guns + 14 × 4-pounder guns; Privateer: 16 × 6-pounders; Royal Navy: 16 × 6-pounder guns

Eugénie was a French 16-gun privateer ship-sloop launched in 1793. The French Navy requisitioned her in March 1794 for coastal escort and patrol purposes. After the navy returned her to civilian ownership at Nantes in February 1796 she returned to privateering.

On 16 March 1798 HMS Magnanime was escorting a small convoy when she spied a privateer lurking about, seeking an opportunity to pick off a prize. Captain Michael de Courcy set Magnanime in chase. Twenty-three hours and 256 miles later, he captured Eugénie at 42°N 12°W. She had been armed with 18 guns, eight of which she had thrown overboard during the chase, and had a crew of 107 men. She was coppered and appeared completely new.

She arrived at Plymouth on 4 May. The Royal Navy took her into service under the name HMS Pandour, but never commissioned her. In 1800 her name became HMS Wolf. Wolf never saw active duty either.

The Admiralty offered her for sale at Plymouth on 31 August 1801. She was broken up in 1802.
