= Intrepid-class ship of the line =

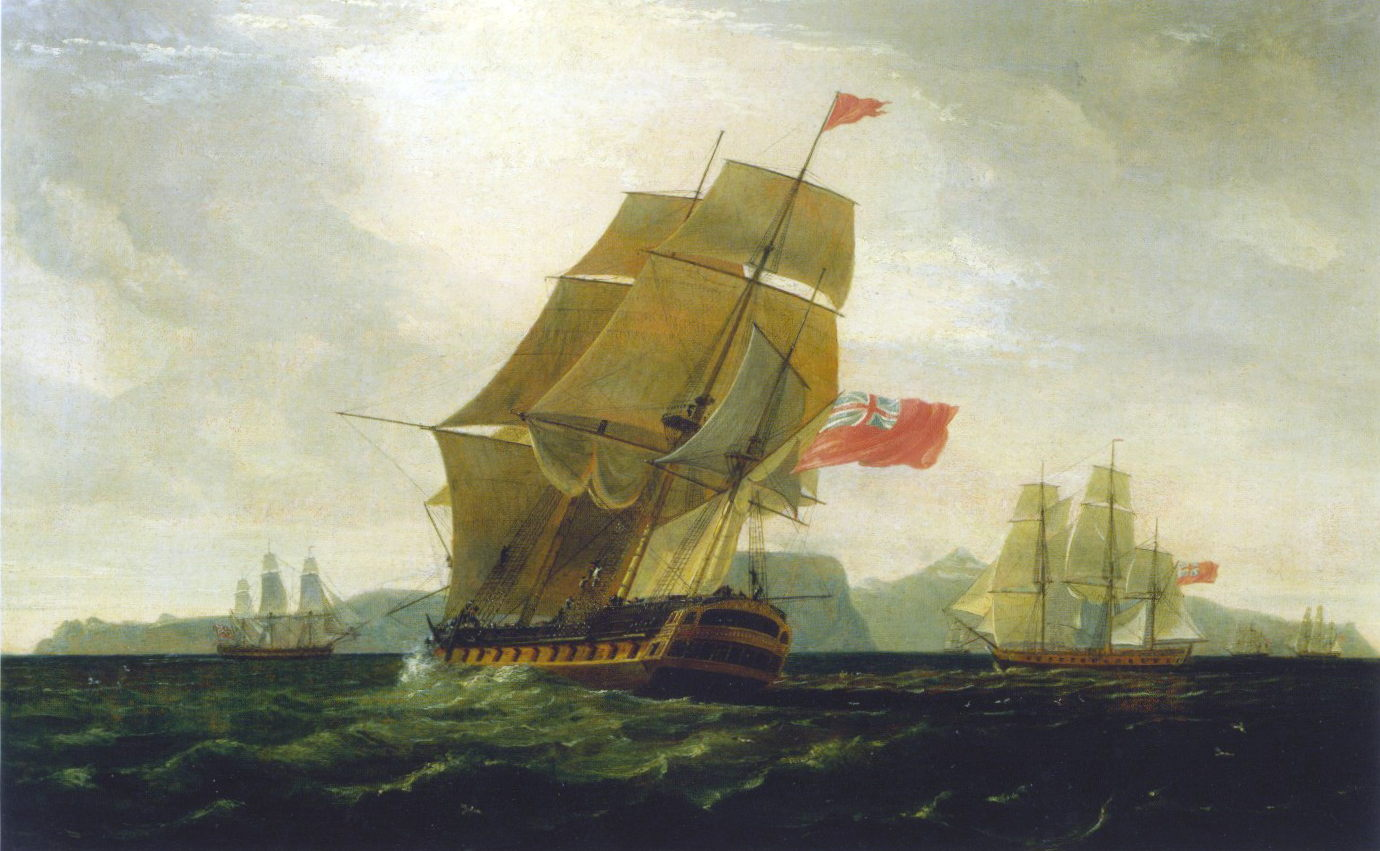
- HMS Diadem at the capture of the Cape of Good Hope

Class overview
- Name: Intrepid
- Operators: Royal Navy
- Preceded by: Ardent class
- Succeeded by: Worcester class
- In service: 4 December 1770 - 1827
- Completed: 15
- Lost: 3

General characteristics (as built)
- Type: Ship of the line
- Tons burthen: 1,369 50/94 (bm)
- Length: 159 ft 6 in (48.6 m) (gundeck)
- Beam: 44 ft 4 in (13.5 m)
- Depth of hold: 19 ft (5.8 m)
- Propulsion: Sails
- Sail plan: Full-rigged ship
- Complement: 500
- Armament: 64 muzzle-loading, smoothbore guns: Lower gundeck: 26 × 24 pdr guns; Upper gundeck: 26 × 18 pdr guns; Forecastle: 2 × 9 pdr guns; Quarter deck: 10 × 9 pdr guns

The Intrepid-class ships of the line were a class of fifteen 64-gun third rates, designed for the Royal Navy by Sir John Williams. His design, approved on 18 December 1765, was slightly smaller than Sir Thomas Slade's contemporary Worcester-class design of the same year, against which it was evaluated competitively. Following the prototype, four more ships were ordered in 1767–69, and a further ten between 1771 and 1779.

== Ships ==
- HMS Intrepid

Builder: Woolwich Dockyard
Ordered: 16 November 1765
Laid down: January 1767
Launched: 4 December 1770
Completed: 31 January 1771
Fate: Sold to be broken up at Plymouth, 26 March 1828

- HMS Monmouth

Builder: Plymouth Dockyard
Ordered: 10 September 1767
Laid down: May 1768
Launched: 18 April 1772
Completed: 9 May 1778
Fate: Broken up at Portsmouth, January 1818

- HMS Defiance

Builder: Woolwich Dockyard
Ordered: 9 June 1768
Laid down: October 1768
Launched: 31 August 1772
Completed: July 1778 at Portsmouth Dockyard
Fate: Wrecked in the Savannah River, 15 February 1780

- HMS Nonsuch

Builder: Plymouth Dockyard
Ordered: 30 November 1769
Laid down: January 1770
Launched: 17 December 1774
Completed: 25 April 1776
Fate: Broken up at Sheerness, June 1802

- HMS Ruby

Builder: Woolwich Dockyard
Ordered: 30 November 1769
Laid down: 9 September 1772
Launched: 26 November 1776
Completed: 27 February 1778
Fate: Broken up at Bermuda, April 1821

- HMS Vigilant

Builder: Henry & Anthony Adams, Bucklers Hard
Ordered: 14 January 1771
Laid down: February 1771
Launched: 6 October 1774
Completed: 11 July 1778 at Portsmouth Dockyard
Fate: Broken up at Portsmouth, April 1816

- HMS Eagle

Builder: John & William Wells, Rotherhithe
Ordered: 14 January 1771
Laid down: April 1771
Launched: 12 May 1774
Completed: 30 July 1776 at Woolwich Dockyard
Fate: Broken up at Chatham, October 1812

- HMS America

Builder: Deptford Dockyard
Ordered: 18 June 1771
Laid down: October 1771
Launched: 5 August 1777
Completed: 29 March 1778
Fate: Broken up, 1807

- HMS Anson

Builder: Plymouth Dockyard
Ordered: 24 April 1773
Laid down: January 1774
Launched: 4 September 1781
Completed: 15 October 1781
Fate: Wrecked in Mounts Bay, 29 December 1807

- HMS Polyphemus

Builder: Sheerness Dockyard
Ordered: 1 December 1773
Laid down: January 1776
Launched: 27 April 1782
Completed: 24 July 1782
Fate: Broken up at Chatham, September 1827

- HMS Magnanime

Builder: Deptford Dockyard
Ordered: 16 October 1775
Laid down: 23 August 1777
Launched: 14 October 1780
Completed: 29 December 1780 at Woolwich Dockyard.
Fate: Broken up at Sheerness, July 1813

- HMS Sampson

Builder: Woolwich Dockyard
Ordered: 25 July 1776
Laid down: 20 October 1777
Launched: 8 May 1781
Completed: 29 June 1781
Fate: Sold to be broken up, 30 May 1832

- HMS Repulse

Builder: Robert Fabian, East Cowes
Ordered: 5 February 1777
Laid down: 12 January 1778
Launched: 28 November 1780
Completed: 15 February 1781 at Portsmouth Dockyard.
Fate: Wrecked off Ushant, 10 March 1800

- HMS Diadem

Builder: Chatham Dockyard
Ordered: 5 December 1777
Laid down: 2 November 1778
Launched: 19 December 1782
Completed: 19 July 1783
Fate: Broken up at Plymouth, September 1832

- HMS Standard

Builder: Deptford Dockyard
Ordered: 5 August 1779
Laid down: May 1780
Launched: 8 October 1782
Completed: 19 December 1782 at Woolwich Dockyard
Fate: Broken up at Sheerness, October 1816
