= HMS Thetis (1817) =

46-gun Leda-class fifth-rate frigate built for the Royal Navy during the 1810s

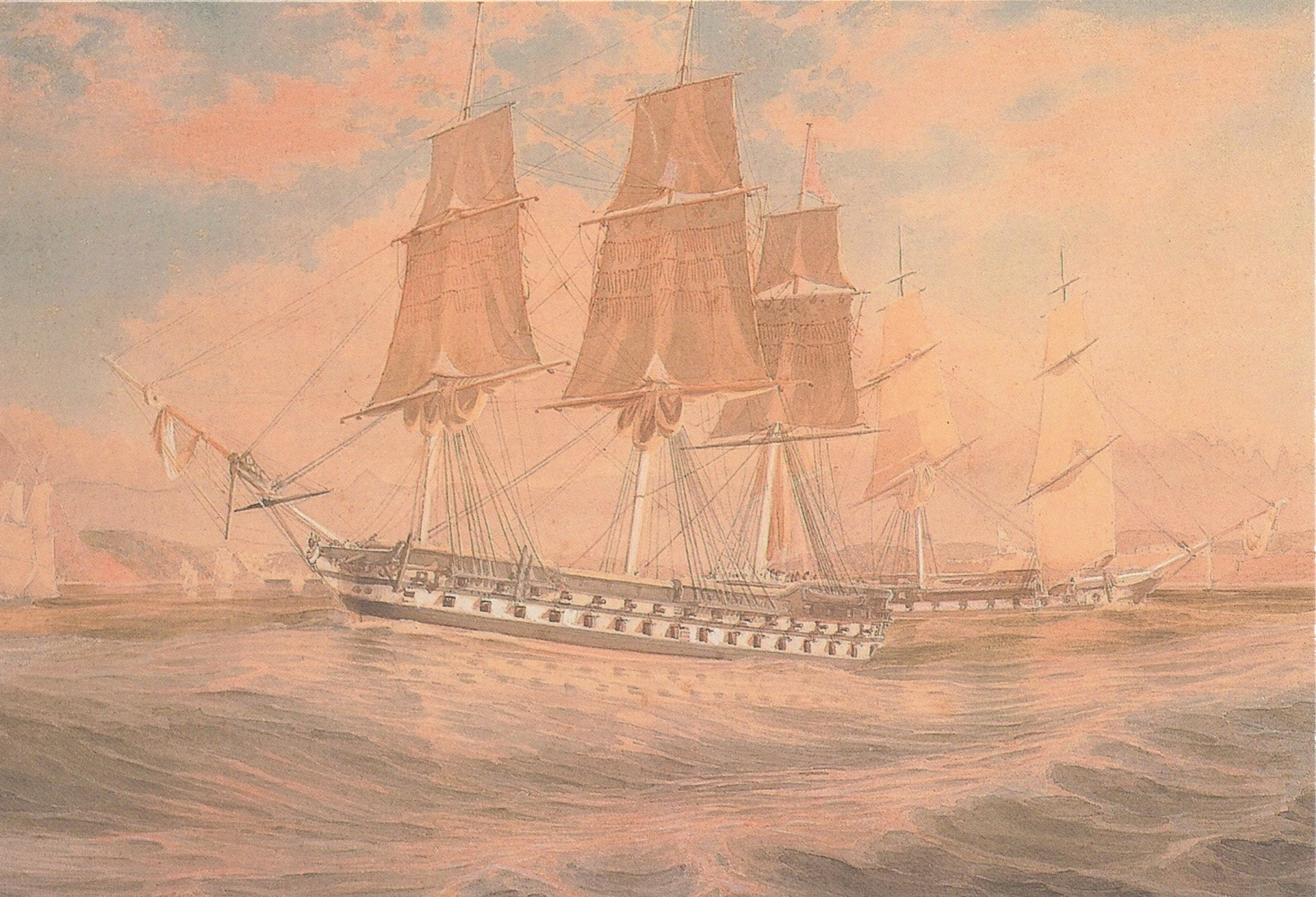
- Ganges and Thetis off Rio de Janeiro, by Emeric Essex Vidal

History

United Kingdom
- Name: Thetis
- Namesake: Thetis
- Ordered: 18 December 1812
- Builder: Pembroke Dockyard
- Laid down: December 1814
- Launched: 1 February 1817
- Completed: 20 August 1823
- Commissioned: 15 March 1823
- Nickname(s): Tea Chest
- Fate: Wrecked, 5 December 1830

General characteristics
- Class & type: Leda-class frigate
- Tons burthen: 1086 32/94 bm
- Length: 150 ft 9 in (45.9 m) (gundeck); 126 ft 7 in (38.6 m) (keel)
- Beam: 40 ft 2 in (12.2 m)
- Draught: 14 ft 8 in (4.5 m)
- Depth: 12 ft 9 in (3.9 m)
- Sail plan: Full-rigged ship
- Complement: 315
- Armament: 46 guns: Upper gundeck: 28 × 18-pdr cannon; Quarterdeck: 14 × 32-pdr carronades; Forecastle: 2 × 9-pdr cannon and 2 × 32-pdr carronades

HMS Thetis was a 46-gun Leda-class fifth-rate frigate built for the Royal Navy during the 1810s. She was first commissioned in 1823 and was assigned to the South America Station three years later. The ship was wrecked in 1830 off Cape Frio, Brazil, with the loss of 22 crewmen; most of her cargo of bullion was successfully salvaged.

== Description ==
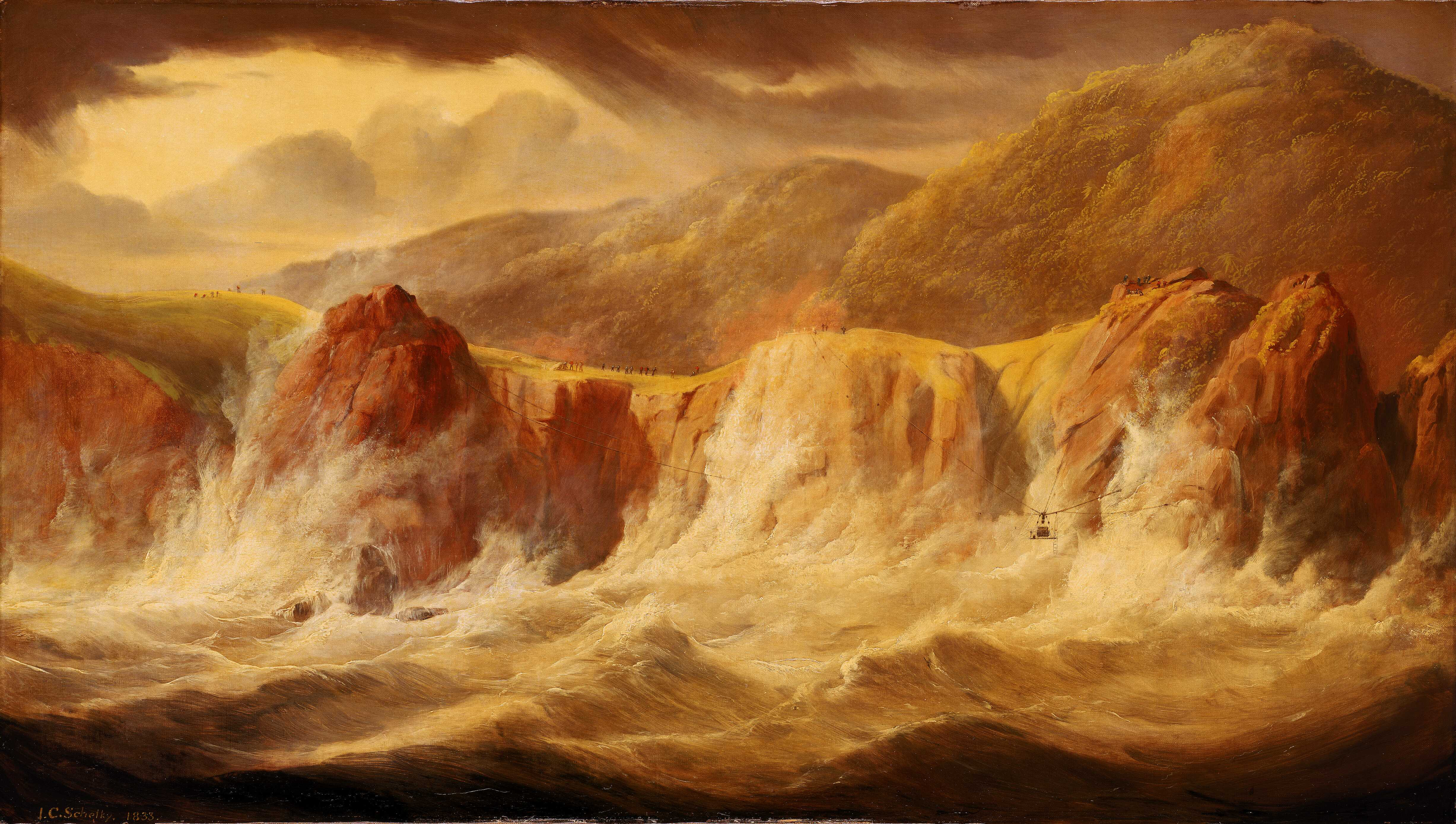
Salvage of Stores and Treasure from HMS 'Thetis' at Cape Frio, Brazil by the artist John Christian Schetky

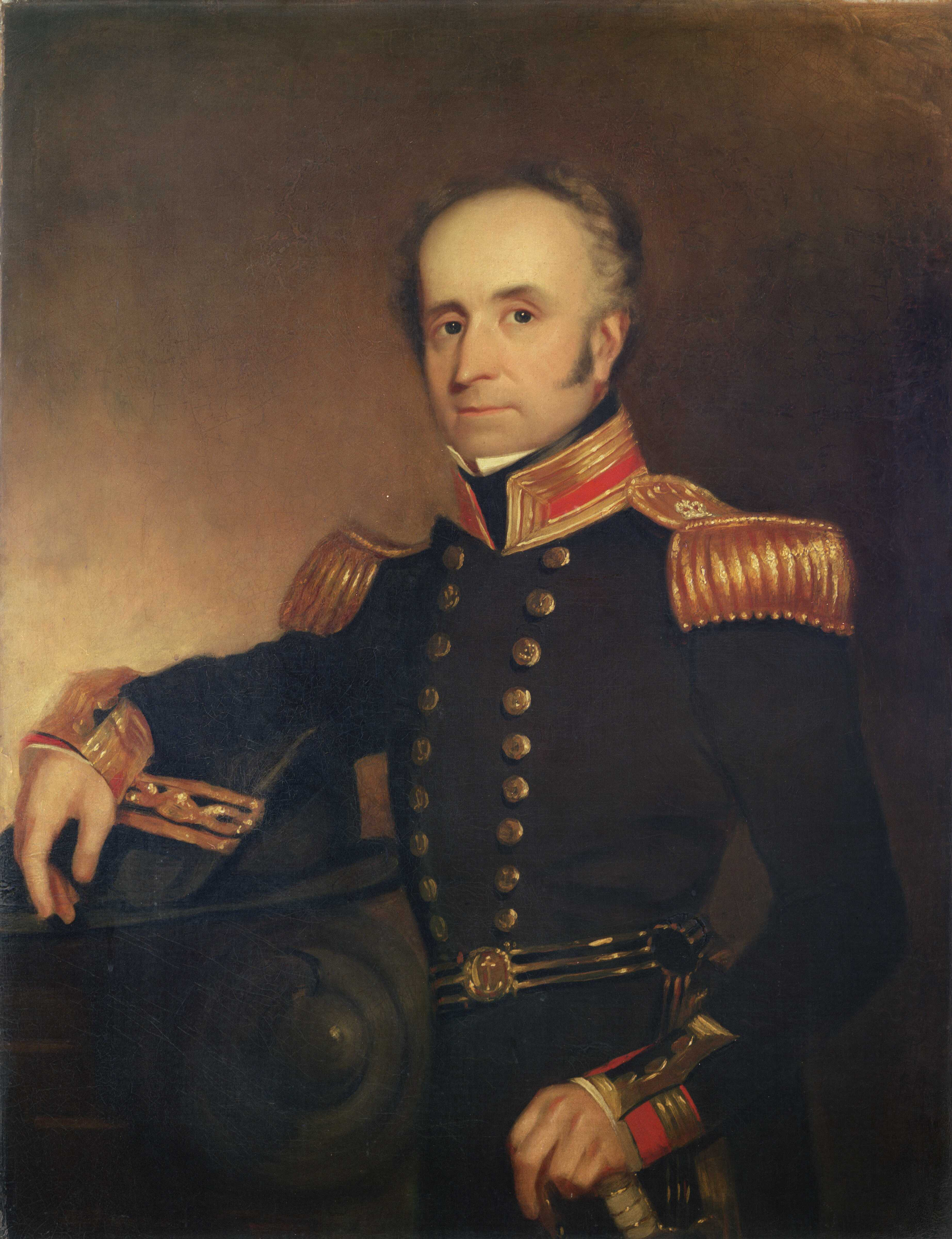
Captain Thomas Dickinson, 1786-1854 conducted the salvage operations

Thetis had a length at the gundeck of 150 feet 9 inches (45.9 m) and 126 feet 7 inches (38.6 m) at the keel. She had a beam of 40 feet 2 inches (12.2 m), a draught of 14 feet 8 inches (4.5 m) and a depth of hold of 12 feet 9 inches (3.9 m). The ship's tonnage was 1086 32/94 tons burthen. Thetis was armed with twenty-eight 18-pounder cannon on her gundeck, fourteen 32-pounder carronades on her quarterdeck and a pair of 9-pounder cannon and two more 32-pounder carronades in forecastle. The ship had a crew of 315 officers and ratings.

== Construction and career ==
Thetis, the eighth ship of her name to serve in the Royal Navy, was ordered on 18 December 1812, laid down in December 1814 at Pembroke Dockyard, Wales, and launched on 1 February 1813. She sailed for Plymouth Dockyard on 21 August 1817 and was completed for ordinary on 20 September. Thetis cost £27,435 to build and £7,699 to fit out for ordinary. The ship's first commission began on 15 March 1823, under the command of Captain John Phillimore, and she was completed for sea duty on 20 August 1823 at the cost of an additional £12,959. Soon after this Thetis was used in an experiment reducing the onboard rum ration, for which the ship received the nickname "Tea Chest".

Thetis was assigned to the South America Station in June 1826 and Captain Arthur Bingham assumed command on 8 November. He drowned in the Guayas River on 19 August 1830 and Captain Samuel Burgess was in command by 29 November. On 5 December Thetis, the ship was wrecked off Cape Frio, Brazil; 22 crewmen drowned. Two-thirds of her cargo of bullion was subsequently salvaged. In August 1832 the Falmouth packet Mutine brought back to England 17,000 dollars salvaged from Thetis.
