= HMS Diadem (1782) =

Ship of the line of the Royal Navy

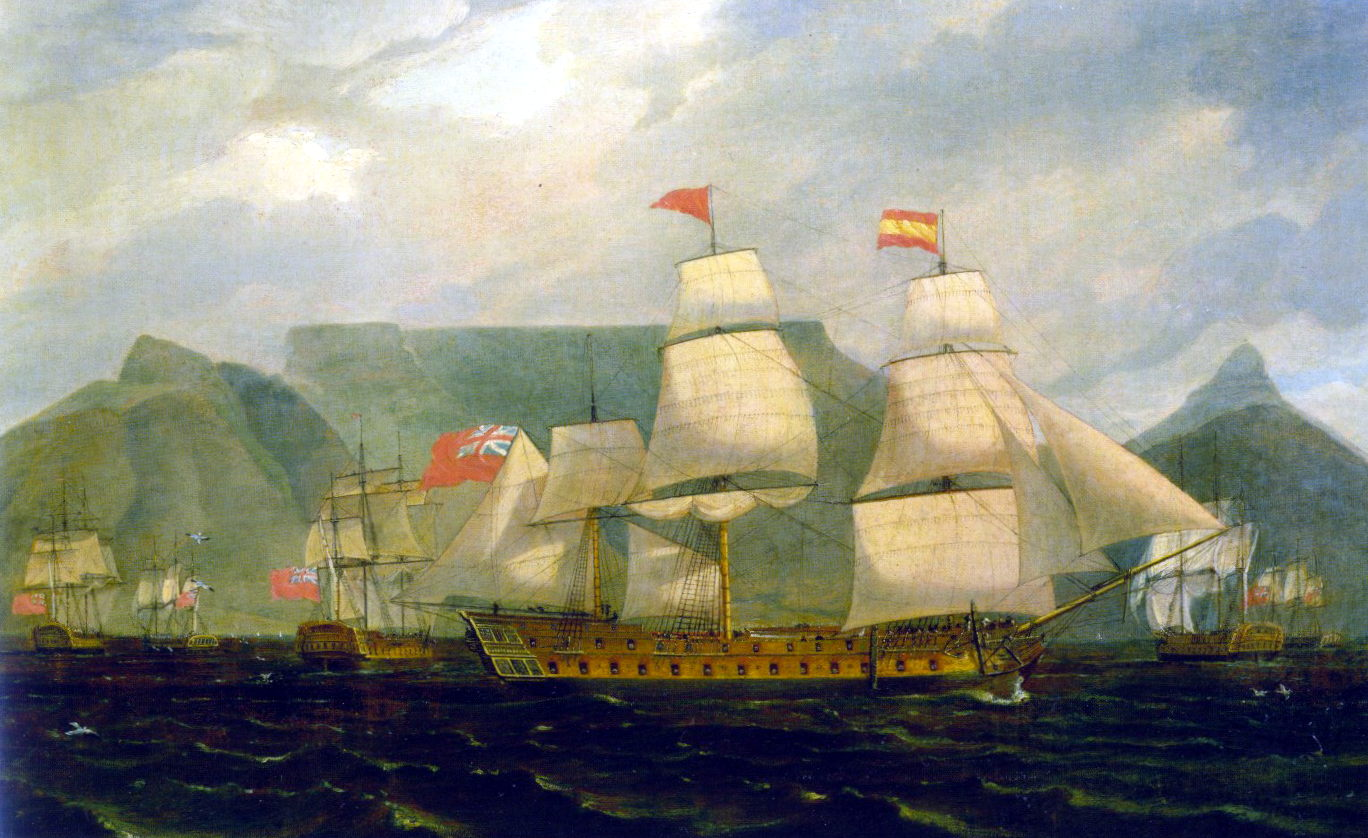
- Diadem at the capture of the Cape of Good Hope, 8 January 1806, by Thomas Whitcombe

History

Great Britain
- Name: HMS Diadem
- Ordered: 5 December 1777
- Builder: Chatham Dockyard
- Laid down: 2 November 1778
- Launched: 19 December 1782
- Commissioned: March 1783
- Honours and awards: Participated in Battle of Cape St Vincent; Naval General Service Medal with clasp "Egypt"
- Fate: Broken up at Plymouth, September 1832

General characteristics
- Class & type: Intrepid-class ship of the line
- Tons burthen: 1375½ bm
- Length: 159 ft 10 in (48.72 m) (gundeck)
- Beam: 44 ft 5 in (13.54 m)
- Depth of hold: 19 ft (5.8 m)
- Propulsion: Sails
- Sail plan: Full-rigged ship
- Complement: 500
- Armament: Gundeck: 26 × 24-pounder guns; Upper gundeck: 26 × 18-pounder guns; QD: 10 × 4-pounder guns; Fc: 2 × 9-pounder guns

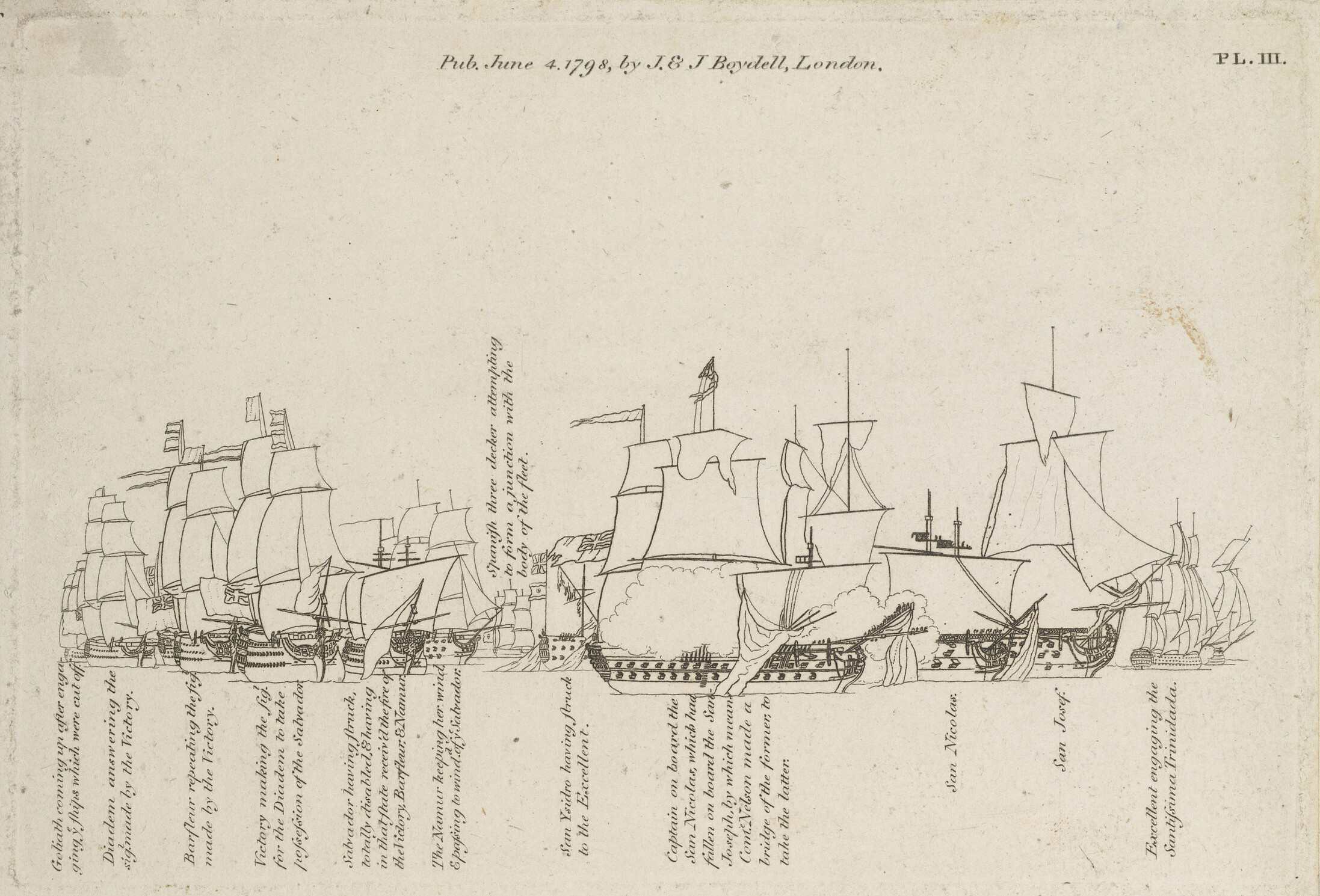
Diadem at Cape St Vincent, 1797

HMS Diadem was a 64-gun third rate ship of the line of the Royal Navy, launched on 19 December 1782 at Chatham. Although built as a warship, she would see the latter part of her career as a troopship, covering the Napoleonic Wars and the War of 1812.

== Service ==
=== Revolutionary Wars ===
In August 1796 she was the flagship of Commodore Horatio Nelson. By December 1796 he had transferred, and was aboard the frigate HMS Minerve, covering the evacuation of the garrison at Elba.

She participated in the Battle of Cape St Vincent in 1797 under Captain George Henry Towry.

In 1798 she was converted to serve as a troopship. On 7 April 1799 she left Portsmouth together with Trompe. They were carry the West York militia to Dublin.

In 1800 under the command of Post Captain Sir Thomas Livingstone she was employed in the expedition to Quiberon and Belle Île under Sir Edward Pellew, subsequently she was employed in the expedition to Cádiz under Admiral Lord Keith.

Given that Diadem served in the navy's Egyptian campaign between 8 March 1801 and 2 September, her officers and crew qualified for the clasp "Egypt" to the Naval General Service Medal (1847) that the Admiralty authorised in 1850 to all surviving claimants. (Note: A first-class share of the prize money awarded in April 1823 was worth £34 2s 4d; a fifth-class share, that of a seaman, was worth 3s 11½d. The amount was small as the total had to be shared between 79 vessels and the entire army contingent.)

=== Napoleonic Wars ===
Between April and July 1810 Diadem was at Chatham being fitted for service as a troopship of 28 guns. In June 1810 Captain John Phillimore (or Philmore) commissioned her for Lisbon.

In January 1812 she carried released Danish prisoners of war from Plymouth to Chatham. Midshipman Drew's biography recollects that Diadem, under the command of the squadron of Home Riggs Popham, (Note: He worked with the Spanish guerrillas to successfully harry the French troops and assault French fortresses on the Basque coast while Wellington was advancing through Spain.) was employed on operations on the north coast of Spain, actively working with the Spanish insurgent forces.

On 6 June 1812, the 1st Royal Marine Battalion embarked aboard Diadem at Portsmouth. The battalion arrived off the coast near Santoña on 15 June, and was involved in the attack on the fort at Castro Urdiales. The fort's garrison of two companies of infantry capitulated on 8 July, the French having evacuated the town the day before. On 10 July, the battalion re-embarked, intending to go to Portugalete, but returned to Castro shortly afterwards.

Further reinforcements for the 2nd Royal Marine Battalion disembarked soon after Diadem arrived on 29 November at Santander, (Note: The Diadem Ship Muster shows entries 3790 to 4119 were for reinforcements embarked, of whom 94 marines had come via HMS Puissant, the remainder via HMS Nemesis.) On 21 December 1812, Diadem embarked half of the 2nd Royal Marine Battalion from Santander, arriving in Cawsand Bay on 4 January.

=== War of 1812 ===
The American vessel Baltimore was in the Bay of Biscay, near Santander when on 7 October 1812 she encountered a British naval squadron, which captured her. The report of her capture noted that she was carrying coffee, sugar, and hides. Lloyd's List reported that she had arrived at Portsmouth on 1 November. It also reported that she was a prize to Diadem.

On 30 March 1813, the Diadem and the Diomede embarked the 1st Royal Marine Battalion under the command of Major Richard Williams. They arrived in Bermuda on 29 May 1813.

Later, she sailed to the Halifax station. Phillimore transferred to command of HMS Eurotas on 4 May 1813, and was succeeded by John Martin Hanchett. Byng assumed command temporarily on 29 June 1813, vice Hanchett, having been seriously wounded at the Battle of Craney Island, this interim arrangement continued until 31 March 1814.

In June 1814, in company with the Leopard, and Diomede, with troops for Quebec.

On 9 December 1814 she arrived at Falmouth, latterly from the Chesapeake.

=== Fate ===
In February 1815, it was reported the Diadem was to be paid off, being in a bad state. In May, work began at Chatham on being refitted as a Unrated Receiving Ship, this was completed in June. As a consequence William Armstrong Usher was appointed as her commanding officer.

Diadem was broken up in September 1832.
