= HMS Ruby (1776) =

Royal Navy ship of the line

- Ruby

History

Great Britain
- Name: HMS Ruby
- Ordered: 30 November 1769
- Builder: Woolwich Dockyard
- Laid down: 9 September 1772
- Launched: 26 November 1776
- Fate: Broken up, 1821

General characteristics
- Class & type: Intrepid-class ship of the line
- Tons burthen: 1369 (bm)
- Length: 159 ft 6 in (48.62 m) (gundeck)
- Beam: 44 ft 4 in (13.51 m)
- Depth of hold: 19 ft (5.8 m)
- Propulsion: Sails
- Sail plan: Full-rigged ship
- Armament: Gundeck: 26 × 24-pounder guns; Upper gundeck: 26 × 18-pounder guns; QD: 10 × 4-pounder guns; Fc: 2 × 9-pounder guns

HMS Ruby was a 64-gun third-rate ship of the line of the Royal Navy, launched on 26 November 1776 at Woolwich. She was latterly in use as a receiving ship at Bermuda and was broken up in 1821.

== Service history ==
The British ships Ruby, Captain Michael John Everitt, Aeolus (or Eolus), 32, and the sloop Jamaica, 18, were cruising off Hayti, when on 2 June 1779, in the Bay of Gonave, they fell in with the 36-gun French frigate Prudente, Captain d'Escars. Ruby chased Prudente for some hours and was much annoyed by the well-directed fire of the enemy's stern-chasers, by which Captain Everitt and a sailor lost their lives. When within easy range of Prudente, at about sunset, Ruby compelled her to strike, with the loss of two killed and three wounded. The Royal Navy took Prudente into service under the same name.

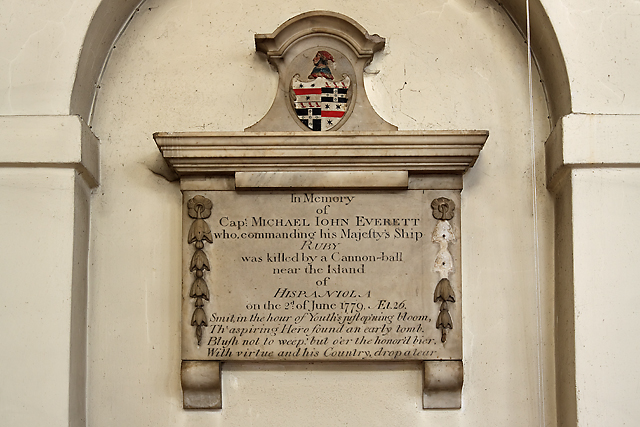
Memorial to Captain Everitt in St Peter & St Paul church, Fareham

Ruby was at Plymouth on 20 January 1795 and so shared in the proceeds of the detention of the Dutch naval vessels, East Indiamen, and other merchant vessels that were in port on the outbreak of war between Britain and the new Batavian Republic.

Ruby, under Captain Henry Edwyn Stanhope, sailed with the first squadron (under Captain John Blankett) to take part in the first British occupation of the Cape, leaving England on 27 February 1795. There she was used on patrols and general duties but saw no action. The Battle of Muizenberg on 7 August 1795 triggered the collapse of the Dutch forces which controlled the Cape of Good Hope at the time.

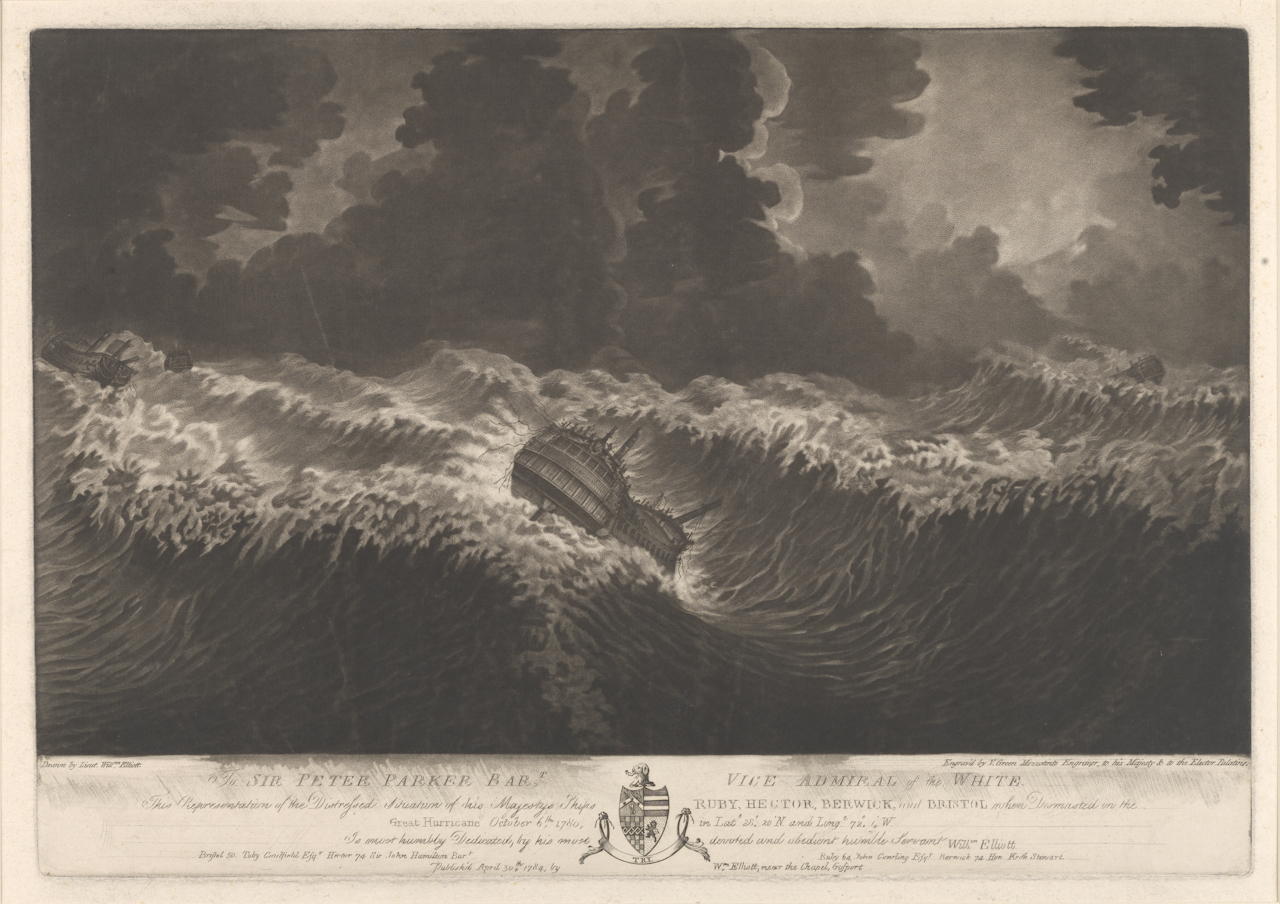
Representation of the Distressed Situation of His Majesty's Ships Ruby, Hector, Berwick and Bristol when Dismasted in the Great Hurricane, 6 October 1780

Upon returning from the Cape to Chatham, it was determined Ruby was in too defective a state to be docked, so the Ruby was paid off in early October 1797.

On 13 July 1800 Ruby was escorting a convoy from St Helena to Great Britain when at 45°N 29°W when she sighted a strange sail that appeared to be a French privateer. Winds were light and next morning Ruby sighted the privateer some three miles ahead. Ruby was unable to catch the privateer, which made use of sweeps to remain just out of gunshot. Towards evening a breeze came up and Ruby succeeded in capturing the privateer at 1a.m. on 15 July.

The privateer was La Fortune, of Bordeaux. She was a new vessel, strongly built, fully copper-fastened, and a good sailer. She was on only her second cruise. She had been out a month but had succeeded only in capturing the brig Fame, which had been sailing from Sierra Leone to London. La Fortune was armed with sixteen 18-pounder guns, four long iron 12-pounder guns, and two 36-pounder brass carronades. She had a complement of 202 men, but she had put 14 on board Fame as a prize crew. Captain Solomon Ferris, of Ruby, recommended that the Navy acquire La Fortune.

On 25 June 1807, Tsar Alexander I and Napoleon entered an accord at Tilsit, one of the secret clauses of which entailed the joint seizure of the Portuguese fleet. This led Napoleon to send a large army into Portugal in October 1807, with a demand that Portugal should detain all British ships and sequester British property. This led to the departure of a naval squadron under Sir Sidney Smith to blockade the Tagus estuary. The squadron consisted of the Hibernia (110 guns), the London (98), the Foudroyant (80) and Elizabeth, Conqueror, Marlborough, Monarch, Plantagenet and Bedford (all 74s). On arrival Smith arranged for the Portuguese Royal Family, all the serviceable Portuguese fleet and 20 armed merchantmen to leave for Brazil, which they did on 29 October. Smith and his squadron accompanied them part of the way, leaving Marlborough, London, Monarch and Bedford to escort the fleet to Brazil. On 30 October 1807 a Russian squadron under Admiral Senyavin entered Lisbon, where they became blockaded by the return of Smith's squadron. A few days after the Tsar's hostile declaration became known in London, five ships left Portsmouth to reinforce the blockade. These were the Ganges, Defence and Alfred (74s) with Ruby and Agamemnon (64s). On arrival at the Tagus they enabled the Foudroyant, Conqueror and Plantagenet to leave for Cadiz. A convention was signed whereby the Russian squadron was to be escorted by the Royal Navy to Portsmouth without lowering their colours. On 12 September, Senyavin's squadron set sail. On 7 October 1808, the squadron arrived at Portsmouth. (Note: Extract from a letter written by a seaman, John Williams, on board HMS Ruby off Lisbon in June 1808 "We are at present at anchor, at the mouth of the harbour, in sight of our Enemies. We are in sight of all of their Shipping, with a naked eye there is of them 13 Saile of the Line of Battle Ships & 25 Sloops and Brigs of War, all the Gun Boats we do not know the number of them. We are only 10 Saile of the Line and 2 Frigates 2 Sloops and Brigs. There is[sic] very heavy Batteries which the French has got, the possession of them one of them has mounted as many heavy guns as there is Days in a year. We expect orders to go in Every Day So Dear Brother Remember me in your prayer." All seems to have gone well, since on the 15th October 1808 John Williams again wrote home from HMS Ruby at Spithead.)

She was commanded by Captain Robert Hall in December 1808, and headed to the Baltic in June 1809. The following year, she was the flagship of Rear Admiral Manley Dixon. She was commanded by Captain Matthew Bradby, and was then superseded by Commander Thomas White (acting) in July 1810. Contemporary newspaper reports mention that in November 1810, she conveyed the former King of Sweden Gustav IV Adolf, before transferring him to the Victory, to arrive at Yarmouth on 11 November 1810. Ruby was paid off on 18 March 1811.

From April to June 1811, she was fitted out at Chatham as receiving ship for Bermuda. On 25 July 1811, HMS Ruby left Portsmouth and sailed to Bermuda. On 21 October 1811, Commodore Evans put the Tourterelle out of commission, and transferred her crew to Ruby. During 1812, HMS Ruby was used as the Receiving Ship at Bermuda, under Lt. Peter Trounce, then Lt James Ward in 1813, Lt James Knight thereafter in 1815. Black refugees from the Chesapeake were quartered aboard Ruby during 1813. The resident Commissioner of the Navy at Bermuda, Commodore Andrew Fitzherbert Evans, had his broad pendant flying on board the Ruby in 1816 and 1817, continuing on since 1812. The ship remained in Bermuda and was broken up there in April of 1821.
