= Spanish frigate Almansa =

Spanish Navy screw frigate of 1865–1894

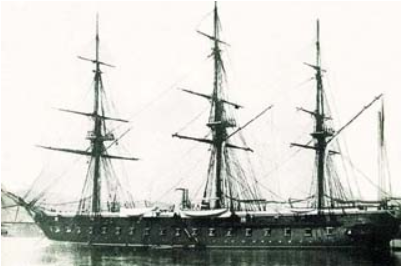

History

Armada Española Ensign First Spanish Republic Cantonal flag of Cartagena in 1873
- Name: Almansa
- Namesake: Almansa, Spain
- Ordered: 4 July 1861
- Builder: Reales Astilleros de Esteiro, Ferrol, Spain
- Cost: 4,140,069.58 pesetas
- Laid down: 29 October 1861
- Launched: 18 July 1864
- Commissioned: June 1865
- Fate: Hulked 1894; Sold for scrapping 1899, 1900, or 1901 (see text)
- Stricken: 1899, 1900, or 1901 (see text)
- Notes: Served Canton of Cartagena July–August 1873

General characteristics
- Type: Screw frigate
- Displacement: 3,960 t (3,900 long tons)
- Length: 84.56 m (277 ft 5 in)
- Beam: 14.96 m (49 ft 1 in)
- Height: 7.41 m (24 ft 4 in)
- Draft: 6.40 m (21 ft 0 in) (mean)
- Installed power: 600 hp (447 kW) (nominal)
- Propulsion: Two John Penn and Sons steam engines; 600 tons coal
- Sail plan: Ship rig
- Speed: 9 to 12 knots (17 to 22 km/h; 10 to 14 mph)
- Complement: 600
- Armament: As built; 30 × 68-pounder (31 kg) 200 mm (7.9 in) smoothbore guns; 6 × 32-pounder (14.5 kg) 160 mm (6.3 in) smoothbore guns; 8 × 32-pounder (14.5 kg) 160 mm (6.3 in) rifled guns; 2 × 120 mm (4.7 in) guns; 2 × 120 mm (4.7 in) howitzers (for use in boats); 2 × 80 mm (3.1 in) howitzers (for use in boats); 1886: 16 × 160 mm (6.3 in) cased guns; 6 × 162 mm (6.4 in) Parrot guns; 1 × 120 mm (4.7 in) rifled bronze gun; 2 × 80 mm (3.1 in) Hontoria guns; 2 × 70 mm (2.8 in) Hontoria guns; 2 × machine guns; 1896: 17 × 162 mm (6.4 in) modified Palliser guns; 6 × 162 mm (6.4 in) Parrot guns; 8 × smaller guns; 3 × machine guns

Almansa was a Spanish Navy screw frigate in commission from 1865 to 1894. She served in the Chincha Islands War of 1865–1866, seeing combat in the Battle of Callao in 1866, and the Cantonal Rebellion of 1873–1874, briefly serving the Canton of Cartagena before fighting on the central government side in the Battle of Portmán. She was named for Almansa, a city in southeastern Spain.

== Characteristics ==
Almansa was a screw frigate with a wooden hull and a ship rig. She had three masts and a bowsprit. She displaced 3,960 tons. She was 84.56 metres (277 ft 5 in) long and was 14.96 metres (49 ft 1 in) in beam, 7.41 metres (24 ft 4 in) in height, and 6.40 metres (21 ft 0 in) in draft. She had two John Penn and Sons steam engines of a nominal 600 horsepower (447 kW) that generated 2,400 indicated horsepower (1,790 kW). She could reach a maximum speed of 9 to 12 knots (17 to 22 km/h; 10 to 14 mph). She could carry up to 600 tons of coal. Her armament consisted of thirty 68-pounder (31 kg) 200 millimetres (7.9 in) smoothbore guns, six 32-pounder (14.5 kg) 160-millimetre (6.3 in) smoothbore guns, eight 32-pounder (14.5 kg) 160-millimetre (6.3 in) rifled guns, and two 120-millimetre (4.7 in) guns. She also carried two 120-millimetre (4.7 in) and two 80-millimetre (3.1 in) howitzers for disembarkation and use in her boats. She had a crew of 600 men.

== Construction and commissioning ==
Almansa was ordered on 4 July 1861 and her keel was laid at Reales Astilleros de Esteiro in Ferrol, Spain, on 29 October 1861. She was launched on 18 July 1864 and commissioned in June 1865. Her construction cost was 4,140,069.58 pesetas.

== Service history ==
=== Chincha Islands War ===
Shortly after Almansa entered service, the Chincha Islands War broke out in the southeastern Pacific Ocean between Spain and Chile in September 1865. Ecuador and Peru joined the war on Chile's side in January 1866, as did Bolivia in March 1866. Assigned to the Spanish Navy's Pacific Squadron, Almansa loaded 300 sailors and Spanish Army soldiers, provisions, ammunition, and other supplies for the rest of the ships in the squadron and departed Cádiz, Spain, in mid-March 1866 to begin a transatlantic voyage. She stopped at Montevideo, Uruguay, where her commanding officer left her due to illness. A new commanding officer, Capitán de fragata (Frigate captain) Victoriano Sánchez Barcáiztegui, who was stationed at the Río de la Plata naval station when Almansa arrived and later would gain fame for his actions during the Chincha Islands War and the Third Carlist War, took command.

Resuming her voyage, Almansa rendezvoused with the rest of the Pacific Squadron off Valparaíso, Chile, on 9 April 1866. The squadron had bombarded Valparaíso on 31 March, and the squadron's commander, Contralmirante (Counter admiral) Casto Méndez Núñez, chose the heavily defended port of Callao, Peru, for his next attack. He divided the squadron into two divisions, the first made up of the armoured frigate Numancia, the screw frigates Berenguela and Reina Blanca, the screw corvette Vencedora, and three auxiliary steamers and the second of Almansa, the screw frigates Resolución and Villa de Madrid, the captured sidewheel paddle steamer Paquete de Maule, and three transport frigates. After burning prize ships the squadron had captured, the squadron set off on 14 April 1866 for San Lorenzo Island off Callao, the second division getting underway at 09:00 and the first division at 16:00. The first division made the voyage under steam and arrived at San Lorenzo Island on 25 April, while the second division, making the journey under sail and delayed by the low speed of one of the transport frigates, arrived on 27 April. Several days of negotiations began on 26 April, during which Méndez Núñez granted neutral countries a four-day delay in his attack to give them time to salvage their interests in Callao. The Spanish ships used the delay to prepare for the attack: The frigates all lowered their topmasts and main yards and altered their rigging to reduce the likelihood of damage to their masts, set up on-board field hospitals, and painted over the white stripes on their hulls with black paint to reduce the ships' visibility and give Peruvian gunners less of an aiming point. Almansa engaged in a day of target practice to improve the performance of her inexperienced gunners in the upcoming battle.

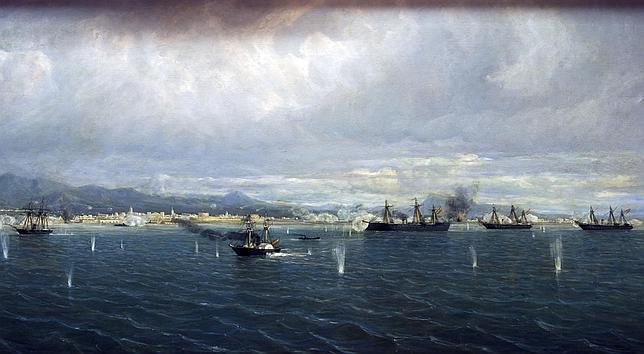
The 19th-century painting The Battle of Callao by Rafael Monleón y Torres (1843–1900). Numancia is at center.

On the morning of 2 May 1866 the Spanish ships entered Callao Bay, beginning the Battle of Callao, the largest battle of the Chincha Islands War. Vencedora and the auxiliary ships stood off near San Lorenzo Island while the other six Spanish ships attacked Callao, with Numancia (operating as Méndez Núñez's flagship), Almansa, and Resolución assigned to bombard the northern part of the harbor while Reina Blanca, Berenguela, and Villa de Madrid shelled the southern part. Numancia fired the first shot at 11:55, and soon all the Spanish ships were exchanging fire with the Peruvian fortifications. At either 14:30 or 15:00, according to different sources, a 500-pound (227 kg) Peruvian Blakely shell exploded aboard Almansa and started a fire in the gunpowder storeroom. A disastrous magazine explosion that would have destroyed Almansa appeared imminent and her officers advised Sánchez Barcáiztegui on several occasions to flood the gunpowder storeroom. He did not answer them at first, but on the last occasion they recommended it he explicitly refused, saying: "Today is not the day to wet the gunpowder," a statement that went down in Spanish Navy history. He agreed instead to withdraw from the battle temporarily so that Almansa′s entire crew could fight the fire, which was extinguished quickly. Almansa returned to the battle only 30 minutes after withdrawing. She fired 2,200 rounds and took two large-calibre and 67 smaller-calibre hits, suffering nine men killed in action, 26 wounded by enemy fire, and 16 others injured in other ways. By 16:00, only three Peruvian guns still were firing, and Méndez Núñez ordered Almansa, Numancia, Resolución, and Vencedora to shift fire from the harbor defenses to the city itself, but he rescinded the order after his officers advised him that his squadron had run low on explosive shells and would have to use solid shot, which would be ineffective. Running low on ammunition and with only the last three Peruvian guns still firing, the Spanish squadron ceased fire at 16:40 as dusk fell and fog began to form in the harbor.

Méndez Núñez's squadron spent the next several days at San Lorenzo Island just off Callao, making repairs and tending to casualties. The Chincha Islands War ended in a ceasefire on 9 May 1866. On 10 May 1866, Mendez Núñez's squadron burned and scuttled Paquete de Maule and departed. Viewing a passage around Cape Horn in winter as too dangerous for the damaged Berenguela and Numancia, he divided the squadron, sending Berenguela, Numancia, Vencedora, and three auxiliary ships to the Philippines in the Spanish East Indies for repairs while he led the rest of the ships on a voyage eastward around Cape Horn to Rio de Janeiro, Brazil, with Villa de Madrid as his flagship. The ships passed around Cape Horn in winter and scurvy broke out among Almansa′s crew. By the time the squadron made port at Rio de Janeiro on either 24 June or the afternoon of 27 June 1866, according to different sources, Almansa had suffered numerous mechanical breakdowns and a broken rudder, her crew had suffered 10 deaths – four from wounds suffered at Callao, one from tuberculosis, and five from scurvy – and 369 other men had fallen sick.

=== 1866–1872 ===
Almansa and the rest of Méndez Núñez's squadron arrived at the Rio de la Plata (River Plate) on 12 December 1866. After the Ministry of the Navy received word that a combined Chilean Navy-Peruvian Navy squadron planned to cross into the Atlantic Ocean, Méndez Núñez received orders to return to Rio de Janeiro. On 24 December 1866, the Ministry of the Navy ordered Méndez Núñez to move to Havana and prepare to defend the Antilles against attack. These orders reached Méndez Núñez on 1 February 1867. On 20 March 1867 Almansa, Concepción, and Navas de Tolosa arrived at Santiago de Cuba on the southeastern coast of Cuba under Méndez Núñez's overall command. The ships then proceeded to Havana, which they reached on 26 March 1867. The squadron also visited Saint Thomas in the Danish West Indies during its Caribbean deployment. After Méndez Núñez received new orders to proceed to Rio de Janeiro, he transferred his flag to Almansa and his squadron got underway, arriving at Rio de Janeiro in August 1867. The squadron again moved to the Rio de la Plata in November 1867.

Almansa returned to Spain in April 1868 and was under repair during the Glorious Revolution of September 1868, in which Queen Isabella II was deposed. Almansa arrived at Cartagena, Spain, in December 1868 and began an assignment to the Mediterranean Squadron, in which she remained in 1869. She was reassigned to the South American squadron in mid-1871, serving as flagship for Contralmirante (Counter Admiral) José Polo de Bernabé y Mordella, who commanded the squadron until February 1872. Almansa operated with Reina Blanca and the screw schooner Ceres on the South American station until 1872, defending Spanish interests during conflicts in the region. In September 1872, the screw corvette Narváez replaced Almansa, which returned to Spain.

=== Cantonal Rebellion ===
==== Cantonal service ====
King Amadeo I abdicated and the First Spanish Republic was proclaimed in February 1873. Amid unrest under the new government, part of Almansa′s crew mutinied on 29 May 1873 while she was at Cartagena. On 12 July 1873 the Canton of Cartagena declared its independence from the republic, beginning the Cantonal Rebellion. The central government regarded the Cantonalists as separatists, and combat broke out between it and the Cantonalists. Almansa was one of the first Spanish Navy ships to side with the Cantonalists. On 20 July 1873, the central government of the First Spanish Republic declared that ships flying the red flag of the Canton were pirates, and other naval powers made similar declarations and sent warships to Spanish waters to protect their interests.

Almansa got underway from Cartagena on the evening of 28 July 1873 with the armoured frigate Vitoria, which also had joined the Cantonalists, to steam along the coast of Spain to recruit Spaniards to the Cantonalist cause and to raise money for the Canton from coastal cities. The Cantonal squadron lacked naval officers, and the ships were under the command of a cavalry general, Juan Contreras y Román, wo was aboard Vitoria. The two ships arrived off Almería early on the morning of 29 July, and after negotiations between Contreras and local officials that lasted all day, Contreras informed the officials that if they did not pay him US$100,000 and give him the city's books and all the money in its treasury, his ships would destroy the town at daybreak on 30 July. In return, the local authorities informed him that they would not comply and would not allow him to disembark.

At 08:30 on 30 July, a messenger from the ships came ashore to deliver a notice to the city's consular officials that the ships would open fire in an hour, but he was unsuccessful. At 10:00, Almansa provided covering fire for four armed launches attempting to land Cantonalist troops, but rifle fire from shore drove off the launches without a landing, reportedly with eight men killed and 16 wounded aboard the launches. Almansa and Vitoria then fired about a dozen 100-pound (45 kg) projectiles at the city before hoisting a white flag of truce. When the city's forces hoisted a black flag in response, the ships resumed fire, this time with 200-pound (91 kg) projectiles. With occasional lulls, the ships continued firing until 16:30. Sometime between 18:30 and 19:00 they weighed anchor and headed west. Almansa and Vitoria next stopped at Motril, where they extorted a payment of US$12,000 to be paid to them at Málaga. They then began a voyage to Málaga.

Learning of the incident at Almería, the German commander of the international squadron off Spain, Reinhold von Werner, sent his flagship, the Imperial German Navy armored frigate SMS Friedrich Carl, and the British Royal Navy battleship HMS Swiftsure to intervene. Before Almansa and Vitoria could reach Málaga, Friedrich Carl and Swiftsure intercepted them on 1 August 1873. The wooden Almansa, with Contreras aboard, stood little chance against the two armored ships, and after a brief exchange of gunfire, the two Cantonalist ships surrendered to avoid Contreras and Almansa′s 400-man crew being killed or injured. Facing little opposition from the Cantonalist crews, Swiftsure and Friedrich Carl detained the two ships without prior approval from London or Berlin. Swiftsure and Friedrich Carl officially took custody of Vitoria and Almansa as pirate ships on 2 August. After laborious negotiations, Werner turned over the two Spanish ships to Royal Navy Vice-Admiral Hastings Yelverton, who in turn sent them to Gibraltar, where the British returned them to the Spanish central government on 26 September 1873. The Spanish central government incorporated them into its squadron under the command of Contralmirante (Counter Admiral) Miguel Lobo y Malagamba, who made Vitoria his flagship.

==== Central government service ====
The central government squadron, composed of Vitoria, Almansa, Navas de Tolosa, the screw frigate Carmén, the paddle gunboats Colón and Ciudad de Cádiz, the screw corvette Diana, and the screw schooner Prosperidad, got underway from Gibraltar bound for Cartagena on 5 October 1873. News of the passage of this squadron through Almería reached Cartagena on 9 October, and the Cantonalist forces made plans to attack it. Contreras took command of the Canton's squadron, which consisted of Numancia, the armoured corvette Méndez Núñez, the armoured frigate Tetuán, and the paddle gunboat Despertador del Cantón (formerly named Fernando el Católico in Spanish Navy service).

On 10 October 1873, the central government squadron arrived off Cartagena to establish a blockade. During the evening of 10 October, Lobo kept his ships just outside Cartagena's harbor off of Escombreras, an islet at the mouth of the harbor. Later, during the night of 10–11 October, he ordered his ships to raise sail, probably to economize on their use of coal, and a strong north wind blew his squadron offshore and eastward to a position east of Portmán, Spain.

Flying the same flag of Spain as the central government squadron rather than the red Cantonal flag to avoid international antipiracy actions against its ships, the Cantonal squadron gathered on the morning of 11 October 1873 and got underway for the open sea at 10:30, escorted by five ships of the British Royal Navy, one of the Imperial German Navy, one of the Italian Regia Marina (Royal Navy), and one of the French Navy. At 11:30, the two squadrons sighted one another, with the Cantonal ships 3 nautical miles (5.6 km; 3.5 mi) due south of Cape Agua and Lobo's squadron about 6 nautical miles (11 km; 6.9 mi) to the south in waters east of Cape Negreti, and the Battle of Portmán began. Lobos, whose ships were in no particular order, ordered his squadron to turn to port with Vitoria in the lead. Numancia was faster than the other Cantonal ships, and she charged at Vitoria, racing ahead of the rest of her squadron. After exchanging fire with Vitoria, Numancia cut the central government line between Diana and Almansa, crossed astern of Carmén and Navas de Tolosa, and set off in pursuit of Ciudad de Cádiz. Vitoria broke off to chase Numancia, leaving Almansa, Carmén, and Navas de Tolosa to face the approaching Tetuán and Méndez Núñez.

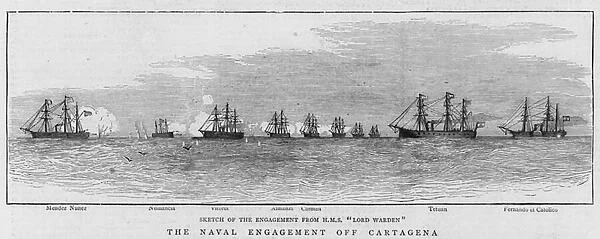
"The Naval Engagement off Cartagena." Drawing of the Battle of Portman published in The Graphic on 25 October 1873. Almansa is fourth from left.

Méndez Núñez opened fire on Almansa and Vitoria at very long range at 12:19, and most of the shots did not cover even half the distance to her targets, but she then closed with Carmén, and Méndez Núñez and Carmén scored hits on one another. Méndez Núñez then responded to an order to come to the assistance of Numancia, which was fleeing toward Cartagena with Vitoria in hot pursuit. Almansa, Carmén, and Navas de Tolosa were steering toward Cartagena in the wake of Numancia and Vitoria, putting them on a converging course with Méndez Núñez. They exchanged fire with Méndez Núñez at very long range, but most of the shots were wild and neither side suffered damage. Méndez Núñez and Numancia both reached safety in Cartagena's harbor under cover of the guns of the coastal forts. Meanwhile, Tetuán exchanged fire with Vitoria, then engaged Almansa, Carmén, and Navas de Tolosa and appeared to hit Almansa six times without receiving any damage in return. Passing Almansa, Carmén, and Navas de Tolosa, Tetuán steamed toward Diana, but upon discovering that the other Cantonal ships had fled, she turned around off Cape Negreti and slowly steamed back towards Cartagena, again engaging in succession Carmén, Almansa, and Navas de Tolosa. After a close-range exchange of fire with Vitoria, Tetuán gained the safety of the harbor, as did Despertador del Cantón.

The central government squadron had exhausted its ammunition, and at around 15:00 Lobo withdrew it to the east, bringing the battle to a close. In its immediate aftermath, the Cantonalists acknowledged that they had suffered 13 killed in action and 49 wounded, while Lobo claimed that his squadron had suffered no casualties, although one of his frigates reportedly withdrew eastward to "land the sick." Casualty figures eventually were revised to 12 dead and 38 wounded in the Cantonal squadron and 11 dead and 32 wounded on the central government side.

After the battle, the central government squadron tried to blockade Cartagena. However, when the Cantonal squadron sortied again on 13 October 1873, Vitoria had only enough coal for two days' steaming, and the Cantonal squadron, under a new commander, maintained a disciplined formation with Numancia remaining her position in the line despite her higher speed than that of the other two Cantonal frigates. Rather than engage the Cantonalists, Lobo chose to withdraw the central government squadron toward Gibraltar, expecting to receive reinforcement of his squadron in the form of the armored frigate Zaragoza and the paddle gunboat Ulloa. This withdrawal led the central government to dismiss Lobo and replace him as commander of the central government squadron with Contralmirante (Counter Admiral) Nicolás Chicarro. Chicarro took command of the central government squadron on 18 October 1873 and reinstated the central government's blockade of Cartagena on 23 October 1873. Like Lobo, however, Chicarro avoided combat, despite the arrival of Zaragoza, which gave him a squadron that included two armored frigates.

The Cantonal Rebellion collapsed, and the Canton of Cartagena surrendered to central government forces on 12 January 1874. Cantonal leaders and about 1,750 soldiers, volunteers, and family members who had supported the rebellion boarded Numancia and the steamer Darro to flee Spain. At the time, Chicarro's central government squadron was blockading Cartagena, with Vitoria and the armoured frigate Zaragoza in line ahead, Almansa and Carmén on either side, and Navas de Tolosa in reserve. As Numancia emerged from the harbor on 12 January, Vitoria and Zaragoza opened fire on her. She stopped her engines, which Chicarro interpreted as her surrendering to him, and he ordered his ships to cease fire and reduce speed. However, Numancia suddenly put on full speed, passed across the bows of Vitoria and opened fire, cutting between Carmén and Zaragoza. The central government squadron captured Darro, but Numancia reached the open sea and made for French Algeria with 2,000 people aboard, including 1,635 Cantonalist rebels as passengers. Almansa, Carmén, and Vitoria pursued Numancia, but she escaped and reached Mers El Kébir near Oran on 13 January 1874. The same day, Almansa entered Cartagena.

=== Later service ===
In 1880, Almansa was assigned to the Training Squadron, which was under the command of Contralmirante (Counter Admiral) José Polo de Bernabé. As part of the squadron, she participated in maneuvers off Galicia on 9 August 1881 presided over by King Alfonso XII and Queen Maria Christina. On 13 August the king and queen embarked on the armoured frigate Sagunto to head for La Coruña escorted by the rest of the squadron. The ships called at Villagarcía de Arosa from 15 to 18 August and reached Vigo on 19 August. The king and queen embarked on the gunboat Pelícano, and the squadron arrived at Bayonne in southwestern France on 25 August. The squadron continued to escort the king and queen as they visited the Galician estuaries and was present at the laying of the keel of the unprotected cruiser Reina Cristina at Ferrol, Spain, on 12 August 1881.

Almansa again was assigned to the Training Squadron in Galician waters at the end of August 1884, replacing the screw frigate Lealtad. She again was assigned to the Training Squadron at the beginning of September 1885, getting underway on 23 September and stopping at Cartagena before joining the squadron at Mahón on Menorca in the Balearic Islands.

In January 1886, Almansa replaced Carmén as a training ship for midshipmen, and later she became a training ship for sailors. Amid tensions with the German Empire over the status of the Caroline Islands in the Spanish East Indies, the Training Squadron anchored on 18 March 1886 at Mahón, where Almansa and other ships reinforced it as it prepared to either defend the Balearics from German forces or deploy to the Pacific to defend the Carolines. The crisis passed, and after a stop at Lisbon, Portugal, Almansa anchored at Ferrol on 14 June 1886. During 1886, Almansa underwent changes in her armament, leaving her with sixteen 160-millimetre (6.3 in) cased guns, six 16.2-millimetre (0.6 in) Parrott rifled guns, a 120-millimetre (4.7 in) rifled bronze gun, two 80-millimetre (3.1 in) guns, two 70-millimetre (2.8 in) Hontoria guns, and two machine guns.

Over the following years, Almansa′s armament gradaully was reduced, and she was hulked to serve as a floating jetty at Ferrol in 1894. In 1898 she served as a sailor's depot ship at Ferrol. She was decommissioned and sold for scrapping in either 1899, 1900, or 1901, according to various sources.

== Commemoration ==
The masts of the Spanish Navy training ship Juan Sebastián de Elcano, a barquentine that entered service in 1928, are named for previous Spanish Navy training ships. Her mainmast is named "Almansa" to commemorate Almansa.
