= Battle of Portmán =

1873 naval battle of the Spanish Cantonal Rebellion

- Part of the Cantonal Rebellion
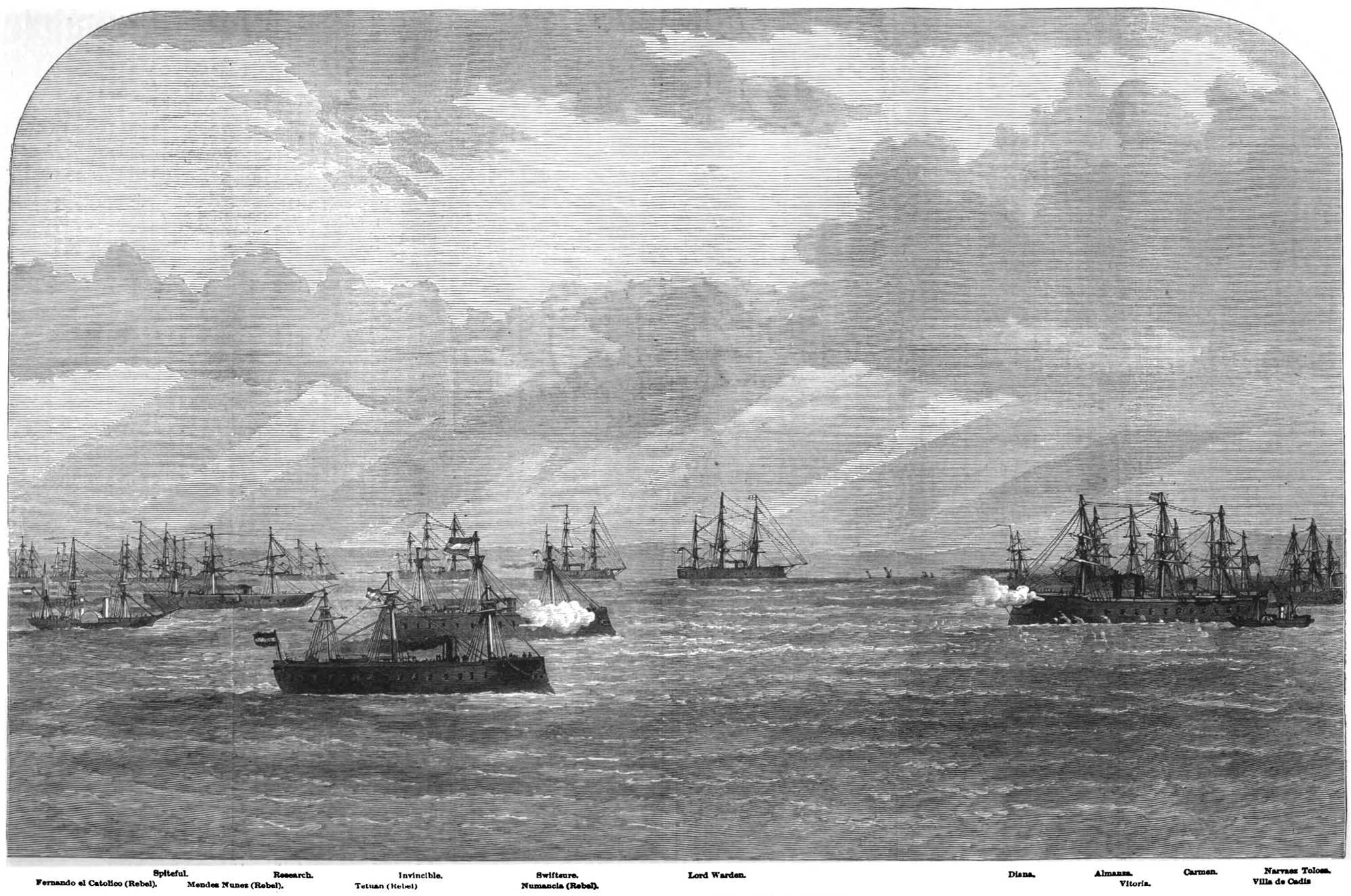
- The battle as depicted in an engraving published by The Illustrated London News on 1 November 1873.
| Date | 11 October 1873 |
| Location | Mediterranean Sea off Cartagena, Spain 37°33′00″N 000°51′00″W |
| Result | Withdrawal of the Cantonalist squadron |

Belligerents
| (Spain) First Spanish Republic | Canton of Cartagena |

Commanders and leaders
| (Spain) Miguel Lobo y Malagamba | Juan Contreras y Román |

Units involved
| Spanish Navy | Cantonal Squadron |

Strength
| • 1 armoured frigate • 3 screw frigates • 2 paddle gunboats • 2 screw schooners | • 2 armoured frigates • 1 armoured corvette • 1 paddle gunboat |

Casualties and losses
| • 11 dead • 32 wounded | • 12 dead • 38 wounded |
- Location off Spain

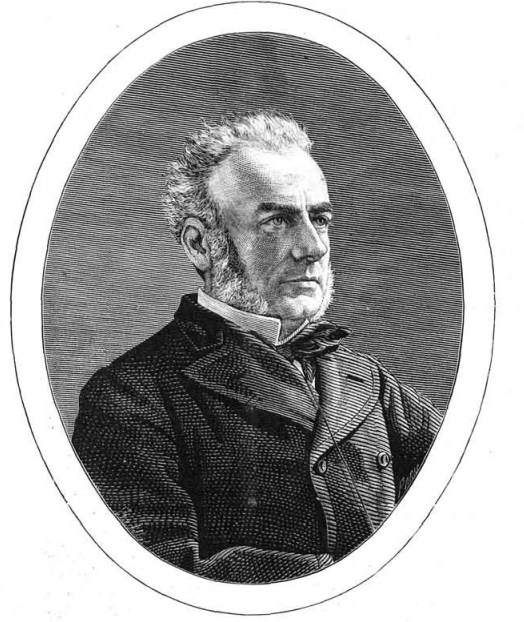
Miguel Lobo y Malagamba (1821–1876).

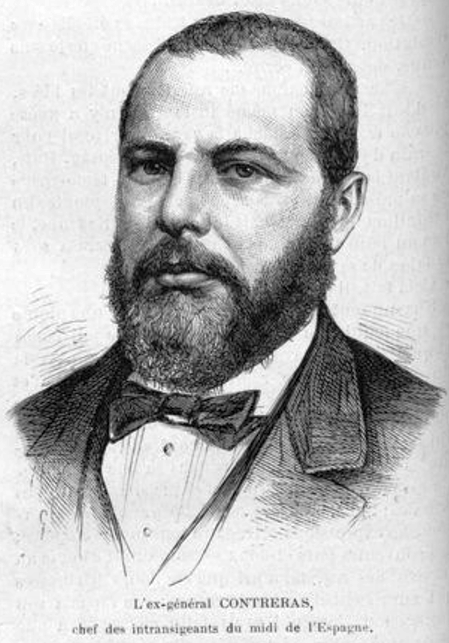
Juan Contreras y Román (1807–1881).

The Battle of Portmán, sometimes referred to by other names such as the Battle off Cartagena and the Battle of Escombrera Island, was a confrontation during the Cantonal Rebellion between the naval forces of the Canton of Cartagena and those of the central government of the Spanish First Republic on 11 October 1873 in which a Cantonal squadron attempted to break a central government blockade of Cartagena. The battle took place in the Mediterranean Sea off Cape Palos near Portmán, Spain. Although no ships were lost on either side, the Cantonal squadron failed to break the blockade and retreated into port at Cartagena.

== Background ==
Following the outbreak of the Cantonal Rebellion with the proclamation of the Canton of Cartagena on 12 July 1873, the majority and best ships of the Spanish Navy came under its control, including, among others, the armored frigates Numancia and Vitoria. The Canton used its fleet to attack other Spanish cities, and on 20 July 1873 the central government of the First Spanish Republic declared that the ships and crews of the Cantonal squadron were engaged in piracy. Other naval powers made similar declarations and sent ships to Spanish waters protect their national interests accordingly.

Vitoria and the screw frigate Almansa steamed to Almería, Spain, to raise funds for the Canton and, when Almería refused to pay, they bombarded the city on 30 July 1873. As they headed toward Málaga to do the same there, the British Royal Navy ironclad HMS Swiftsure and the Imperial German Navy armoured frigate SMS Friedrich Carl detained them on 1 August 1873, then officially captured them as pirates on 2 August 1873. After laborious negotiations, the two ships were returned to the Spanish Navy at Gibraltar on 26 September 1873 and incorporated into Contralmirante (Counter Admiral) Miguel Lobo y Malagamba's central government squadron.

The central government squadron, composed of Vitoria, Almansa, the screw frigates Carmén and Navas de Tolosa, the screw corvette Diana, the paddle gunboats Colón and Ciudad de Cádiz, and the screw schooner Prosperidad, got underway from Gibraltar bound for Cartagena on 5 October 1873. News of the passage of this squadron through Almería reached Cartagena on 9 October, and the Cantonalist forces made plans to attack it. Thanks to a lack of naval officers in the Cantonalist fleet, a cavalry general, Juan Contreras y Román, took command of the Canton's squadron. Three of its ships (Numancia, the armoured corvette Méndez Núñez and the armoured frigate Tetuán) were commanded by merchant marine captains, and its paddle gunboat Despertador del Cantón (formerly named Fernando el Católico in Spanish Navy service) by a maritime pilot.

On 10 October 1873, the central government squadron arrived off Cartagena to establish a blockade. During the evening of 10 October, Lobo kept his ships just outside Cartagena's harbor off of Escombreras, an islet at the mouth of the harbor. Later, during the night of 10–11 October, he ordered his ships to raise sail, probably to economize on their use of coal, and a strong north wind blew his squadron offshore and eastward to a position east of Portmán.

== The battle ==
The Cantonal ships gathered off Escombreras on 11 October between 07:00 and 09:00, and at 10:30 they got underway for the open sea, escorted by five ships of the British Royal Navy (HMS Swiftsure, the armoured frigate HMS Lord Warden, the ironclad sloop-of-war HMS Research, the screw sloop-of-war HMS Spiteful, and the gunboat HMS Hart), the German screw frigate SMS Elisabeth, the Italian Regia Marina (Royal Navy) ironclad ram San Martino, and the French Navy armoured corvette Thétis. Before the battle, Friedrich Carl had captured the Cantonal paddle gunboat Vigilante for engaging in piracy because Vigilante was flying the red flag of the canton instead of an internationally recognized national flag, so to avoid further international actions against its ships, the Cantonal squadron flew the same flag of Spain as the central government squadron. The Cantonal squadron initially adopted a rhomboidal formation, with Numancia in the lead as Contreras's flagship, her port and starboard sides covered by Méndez Núñez and Tetuán, respectively, and Despertador del Cantón bringing up the rear.

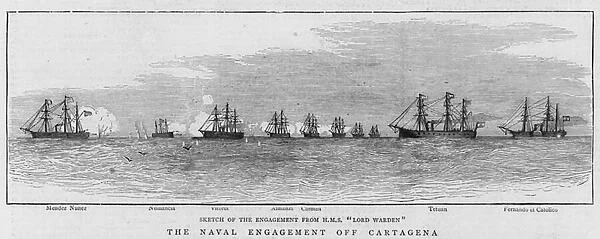
Numancia cutting through the central government line. Left to right: Méndez Núñez, Numancia, Vitoria, Almansa, Carmén, Tetuan, and Despertador del Cantón (ex-Fernando el Católico). Engraving published in The Graphic on 25 October 1873.

By 11:30, Numancia, Méndez Núñez, and Tetuán were in line abreast 3 nautical miles (5.6 km; 3.5 mi) due south of Cape Agua, with Méndez Núñez closest to shore, Numancia next, and Tetuán farthest to seaward, while Despertador del Cantón followed them. They sighted Lobo's squadron, which was about 6 nautical miles (11 km; 6.9 mi) to the south in waters east of Cape Negreti and in no particular order. With her greater speed, Numancia charged toward Vitoria and got too far ahead of the rest of her squadron. The central government squadron turned to port and formed a line to face the attack, and Vitoria, which was leading the squadron, opened fire at Numancia with her bow guns at 12:10. The shots fell short, and Numancia rushed past Vitoria as the two ships exchanged broadsides. Numancia cut through the central government squadron's line between Diana and Almansa, then turned to starboard and crossed Carmén′s and Navas de Tolosa′s sterns as they fired at her, nearly all of their shots falling short. With this maneuver, Numancia cut off Ciudad de Cádiz from the rest of the central government squadron. Ciudad de Cádiz put on maximum sail and fled on an east-northeasterly wind with Numancia in hot pursuit. Leaving Almansa, Carmén, and Navas de Tolosa to face the approaching Méndez Núñez and Tetuán, Vitoria broke off to come to Ciudad de Cádiz′s assistance.

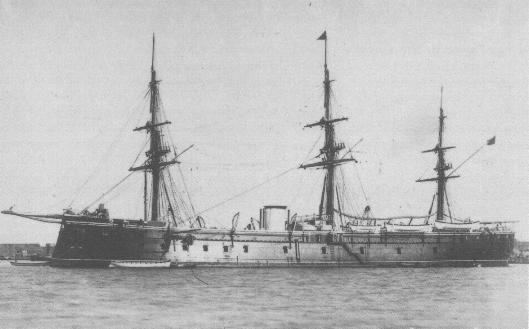
Numancia.

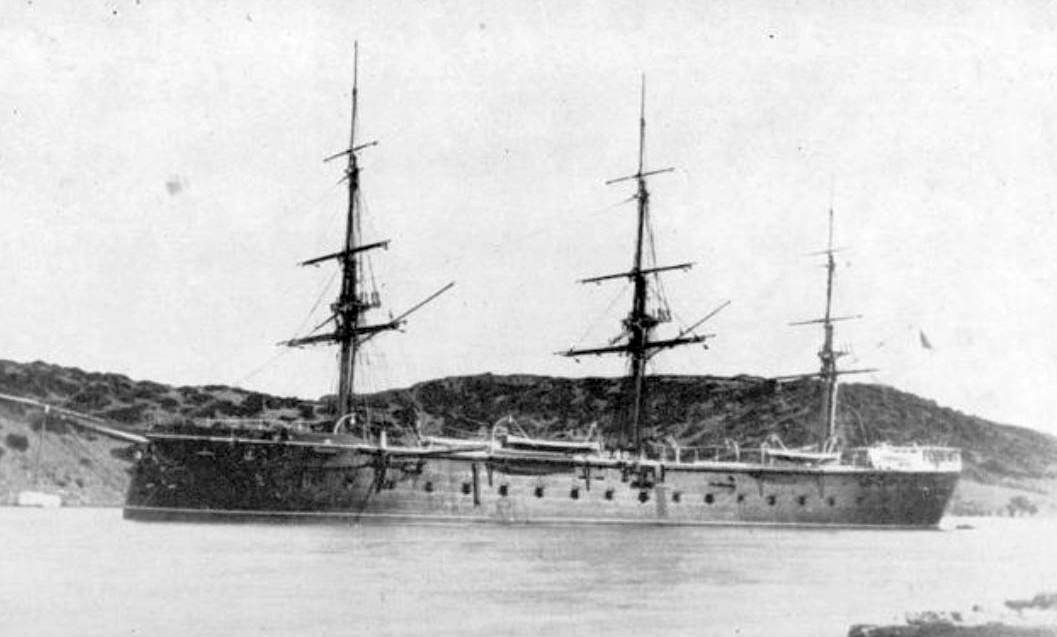
Vitoria at Mahón on Menorca in the Balearic Islands in 1885.

After a chase of 4 nautical miles (7.4 km; 4.6 mi), Numancia caught up to Ciudad de Cádiz. Discerning that Numancia was preparing to ram her, Ciudad de Cádiz feinted to starboard, then, when Numancia turned to cut her off, made a sudden turn to port, spoiling the ramming attempt, and cut across Numancia′s stern before Numancia could fire a shot. Ciudad de Cádiz passed south of the rest of the centralist squadron, fortunate to have avoided destruction and escaping with only a single hit to her paddle wheel. She passed south of Vitoria and the central government screw frigates, joined Diana, and withdrew to a position several nautical miles away, where she remained for the rest of the day, playing no further role in the battle. Vitoria opened fire on Numancia with her bow guns and scored a hit on Numancia′s gun battery. Numancia promptly fled toward Cartagena with Vitoria in pursuit, but Vitoria lacked the speed to catch her, and Numancia found shelter under the guns of the port's coastal fortifications.

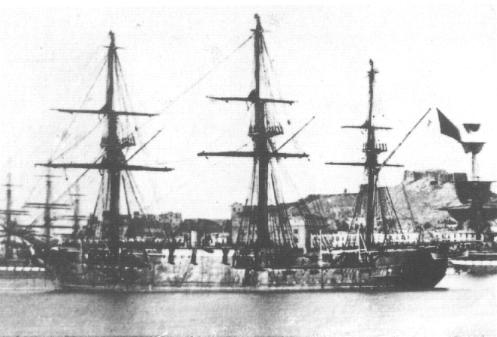
Méndez Núñez.

Meanwhile, Méndez Núñez and Tetuán, slower than Numancia, closed the range with the central government squadron. Méndez Núñez opened fire on Vitoria and Almansa at very long range at 12:19, and most of the shots did not cover even half the distance to her targets. As she closed with Carmén, however, the gunfire became more accurate for both sides: Méndez Núñez scored a hit on Carmén in her fore chains while Carmén hit Méndez Núñez with a round that passed right through her. Méndez Núñez then responded to an order to come to the assistance of Numancia as Numancia fled toward Cartagena. Almansa, Carmén, and Navas de Tolosa were steering toward Cartagena in the wake of Numancia and Vitoria, putting them on a converging course with Méndez Núñez. They exchanged fire with Méndez Núñez at very long range, but most of the shots were wild and neither side suffered damage. Méndez Núñez passed to the north of Vitoria around 14:00 and reached safety in Cartagena's harbor under cover of the guns of the coastal forts.

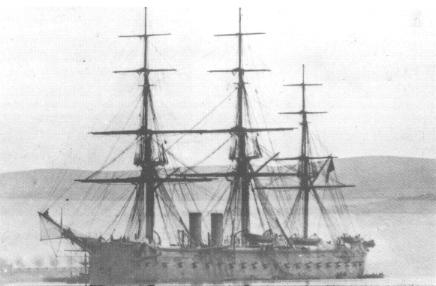
Tetuán.

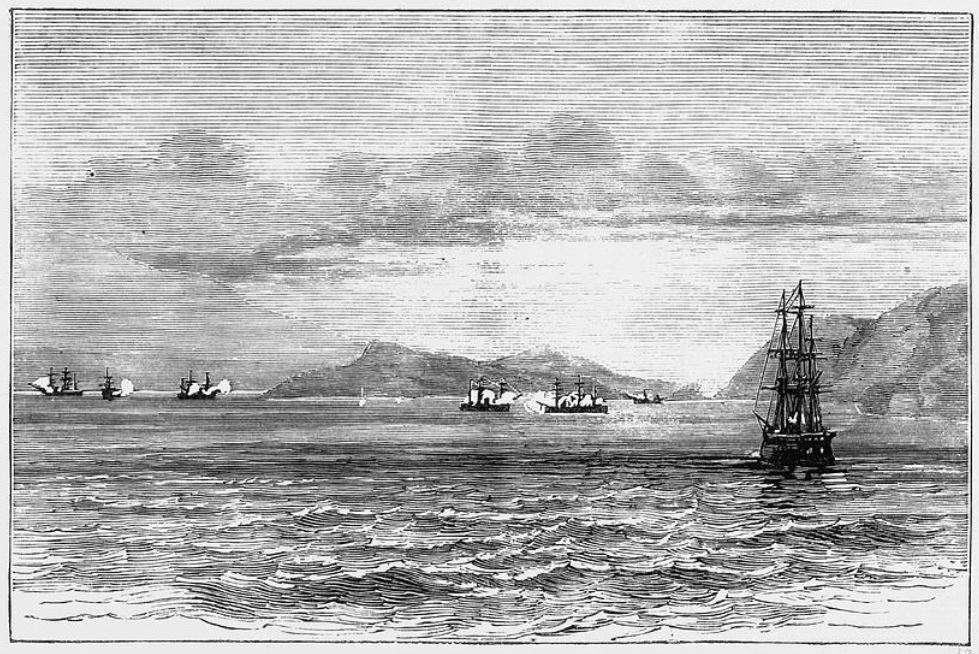
Tetuán and Vitoria exchange broadsides.

At 12:20, Tetuán was about 4 nautical miles (7.4 km; 4.6 mi) south by east of Cape Agua. Steaming very slowly eastward, she crossed the track of Méndez Núñez and exchanged fire with Vitoria. One of Vitoria′s shots landed in the water just under Tetuán′s bows, prompting a crowd of sailors to flee Tetuán′s forecastle. Another of Vitoria′s shots caused Tetuán′s crew to evacuate her bridge. Tetuán nonetheless engaged Almansa, Carmén, and Navas de Tolosa and appeared to hit Almansa six times without receiving any damage in return. Passing Almansa, Carmén, and Navas de Tolosa, she steamed toward Diana, but upon discovering that the other Cantonal ships had fled, she turned around off Cape Negreti and slowly steamed back towards Cartagena, again engaging in succession Carmén, Almansa, and Navas de Tolosa. At 14:00, with Numancia and Méndez Núñez having just escaped into the harbor after avoiding being cut off by Vitoria, Tetuán was just off the entrance to the harbor with Vitoria approaching from the south. Vitoria probably intended to ram Tetuán, but the French armoured corvette Thétis, which had made sail after suffering a mechanical breakdown, inadvertently sailed in between them. With shots from both sides passing through her topsails, Thétis maneuvered to extricate herself from her predicament while Tetuán took advantage of the situation to steam to the west of Vitoria, closer to the guns of Cartagena's coastal forts. By the time Thetis was clear, Tetuán′s port bow was towards Vitoria′s starboard bow. Vitoria was traveling at a greater speed, and she crossed Tetuán′s bow as Tetuán steamed ahead. Both ships then turned to starboard and exchanged starboard broadsides on opposite headings at a range of under 400 yards (370 m). Vitoria scored hits that passed right through Tetuán and then, although the central government claimed she sustained no damage, broke off the engagement, steamed out to sea, and went dead in the water for at least an hour. Meanwhile, Tetuán fired a gun toward Numancia to signal Numancia for support, but Numancia stood out of the harbor for only a few minutes before again withdrawing. Tetuán also gained the safety of the harbor.

Despertador del Cantón remained 5 nautical miles (9.3 km; 5.8 mi) south by west of Cape Agua and Cartagena's harbor all through the battle and did not engage the central government squadron. She, too, returned to Cartagena safely.

The central government squadron had exhausted its ammunition, and at around 15:00 Lobo withdrew it to the east, bringing the battle to a close. In its immediate aftermath, the Cantonalists acknowledged that they had suffered 13 killed in action and 49 wounded, while Lobo claimed that his squadron had suffered no casualties, although one of his frigates reportedly withdrew eastward to "land the sick." Casualty figures eventually were revised to 12 dead and 38 wounded in the Cantonal squadron and 11 dead and 32 wounded on the central government side.

== Aftermath ==
After the battle, the central government squadron tried to blockade Cartagena. However, when the Cantonal squadron sortied again on 13 October 1873, Vitoria had only enough coal for two days' steaming, and the Cantonal squadron, under a new commander, maintained a disciplined formation with Numancia remaining in her position in the line despite her higher speed than that of the other two Cantonal frigates. Rather than engage the Cantonalists, Lobo chose to withdraw the central government squadron toward Gibraltar, expecting to receive reinforcement of his squadron in the form of the armored frigate Zaragoza and the paddle gunboat Ulloa. This withdrawal led the central government to dismiss Lobo and replace him as commander of the central government squadron with Contralmirante (Counter Admiral) Nicolás Chicarro. However, Chicarro also avoided combat, despite the arrival of the armoured frigate Arapiles giving him a squadron that included three armored frigates.
