= Navas de Tolosa =

Navas de Tolosa may refer to:

- Battle of Las Navas de Tolosa, a battle of the Reconquista fought on 16 July 1212
- Spanish frigate Navas de Tolosa, a Spanish Navy frigate in commission from 1866 and 1886
