= Spanish frigate Navas de Tolosa =

Spanish Navy screw frigate of 1866–1893

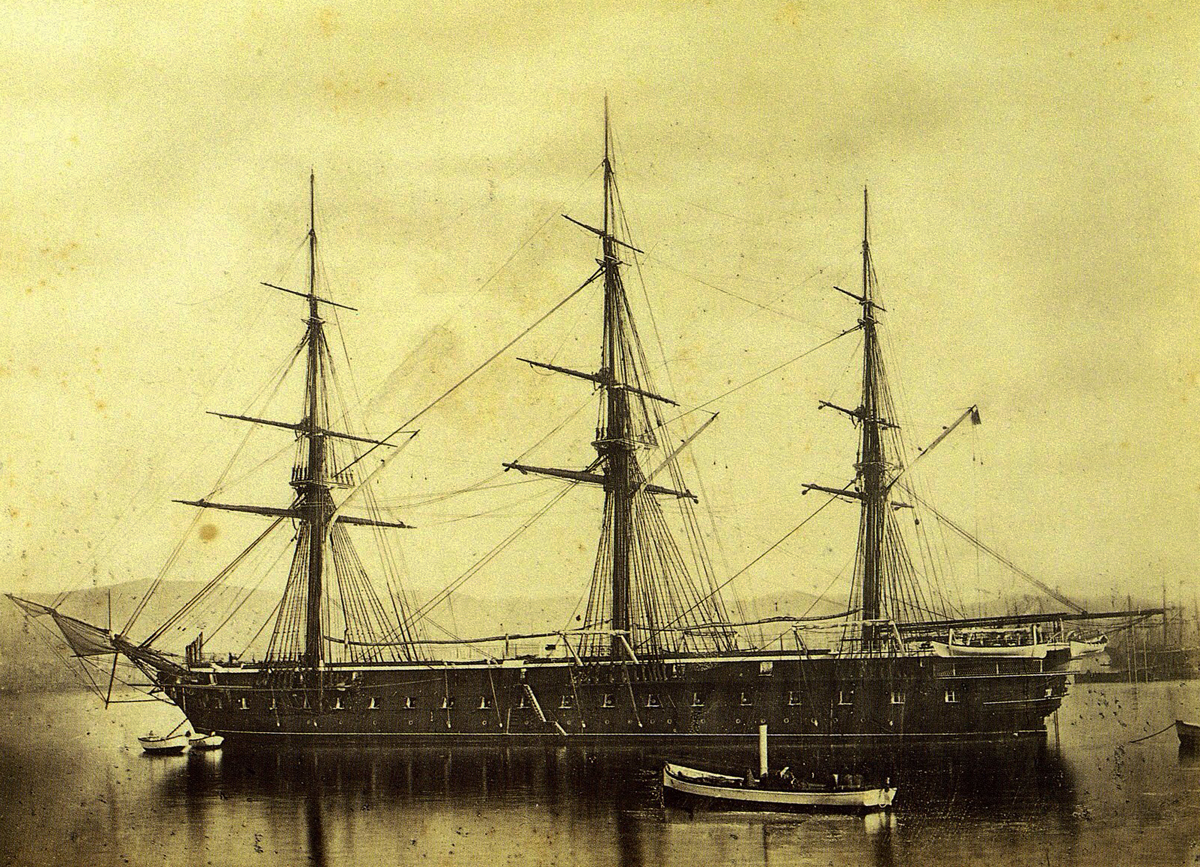
- Painting of Navas de Tolosa by Heribert Mariezcurrena i Corrons (1847–1898).

History

Armada Española Ensign First Spanish Republic
- Name: Navas de Tolosa
- Namesake: Battle of Las Navas de Tolosa
- Ordered: 4 July 1861
- Builder: Arsenal de La Carraca, San Fernando, Spain
- Cost: 4,998,852 pesetas
- Laid down: 20 May 1862
- Launched: 10 May 1865
- Completed: 1866
- Commissioned: March 1866
- Decommissioned: April 1886
- Stricken: 1893
- Fate: Scrapped 1893
- Notes: Ordered disarmed 22 September 1884

General characteristics
- Type: Screw frigate
- Displacement: 4,460 t (4,390 long tons)
- Length: 84 m (275 ft 7 in)
- Beam: 15 m (49 ft 3 in)
- Draft: 8.80 m (28 ft 10 in)
- Installed power: 600 hp (447 kW) (nominal)
- Propulsion: Steam engines; 668 tons coal
- Sail plan: Ship rig
- Speed: 12 to 13 knots (22 to 24 km/h; 14 to 15 mph)
- Complement: 557 to 600
- Armament: 34 to 36 × 68-pounder (31 kg) 200 mm (7.9 in) smoothbore guns; 8 x 32-pounder (14.5 kg) 160 mm (6.3 in) rifled guns; 6 x 32-pounder (14.5 kg) 160 mm (6.3 in) smoothbore guns; 6 x bronze guns (for use in boats)

Navas de Tolosa was a Spanish Navy screw frigate in commission from 1866 to 1886. She was the last wooden screw frigate to enter service in the Spanish Navy. She took part in operations related to the Chincha Islands War and the Ten Years' War. During the Cantonal Rebellion of 1873–1874, she fought on the central government side and participated in the Battle of Portmán. She also took part in the Third Carlist War in 1875. She was named for the Battle of Las Navas de Tolosa of 16 July 1212, known in Islamic history as the Battle of Al-Uqab, a turning point in the Reconquista.

== Characteristics ==
Navas de Tolosa was a screw frigate with a wooden hull and a ship rig. She had three masts and a bowsprit. She displaced 3,960 tons. She was 84 metres (275 ft 7 in) long and was 15 metres (49 ft 3 in) in beam, and 8.80 metres (28 ft 10 in) in draft. Her steam engines were rated at a nominal 600 horsepower (447 kW). She could reach a maximum speed of 12 to 13 knots (22 to 24 km/h; 14 to 15 mph). She could carry up to 686 tons of coal. Her armament consisted of thirty-four to thirty-six 68-pounder (31 kg) 200 millimetres (7.9 in) smoothbore guns, six 32-pounder (14.5 kg) 160-millimetre (6.3 in) smoothbore guns, eight 32-pounder (14.5 kg) 160-millimetre (6.3 in) rifled guns, and six bronze guns for disembarkation and use in her boats. She had a crew of 557 to 600 men.

== Construction and commissioning ==
Navas de Tolosa was ordered on 4 July 1861 and her keel was laid at the Arsenal de La Carraca in San Fernando, Spain, on 20 May 1862. Her construction soon was suspended when the Spanish Navy decided to convert her into an ironclad armoured frigate. The navy dropped these plans on 5 October 1862 and decided to proceed with her construction as a wooden screw frigate. She was launched on 10 July 1865 and was completed early in 1866. She was commissioned in March 1866, the last wooden screw frigate to enter service in the Spanish Navy. Her construction cost was 4,998,852 pesetas.

== Service history ==
=== 1866–1873 ===
Navas de Tolosa was commissioned in haste to reinforce the Spanish Navy during the ongoing Chincha Islands War in the southeastern Pacific Ocean in which Spain faced the forces of Bolivia, Chile, Ecuador, and Peru. She was ordered to proceed to Cádiz, Spain, form a division with the screw frigates Gerona and Princesa de Asturias, and make ready for wartime operations. She was assigned to the naval base at Havana in the Captaincy General of Cuba, from which she departed on 29 July 1866 bound for Rio de Janeiro, Brazil, where she joined the squadron of Contralmirante (Counter Admiral) Casto Méndez Núñez. On 18 September 1866 she arrived at Rio de Janeiro where she and the screw frigates Almansa and Concepción relieved the screw frigates Reina Blanca, Resolución, and Villa de Madrid in the squadron. She escorted Resolución and the transport Trinidad on their return voyages to Spain.

Navas de Tolosa and the rest of Méndez Núñez's squadron arrived at the Rio de la Plata (River Plate) on 12 December 1866. After the Ministry of the Navy received word that a combined Chilean Navy-Peruvian Navy squadron planned to cross into the Atlantic Ocean, Méndez Núñez received orders to return to Rio de Janeiro. On 24 December 1866, the Ministry of the Navy ordered Méndez Núñez to move to Havana and prepare to defend the Antilles against attack. These orders reached Méndez Núñez on 1 February 1867. On 20 March 1867 Navas de Tolosa, Almansa, and Concepción arrived at Santiago de Cuba on the southeastern coast of Cuba under Méndez Núñez's overall command. The ships then proceeded to Havana, which they reached on 26 March 1867. Navas de Tolosa captured the Peruvian Navy steamer Rayo off Cartagena, Colombia, on 25 April 1867. The squadron also visited Saint Thomas in the Danish West Indies during its Caribbean deployment.

After Méndez Núñez received new orders to proceed to Rio de Janeiro, he transferred his flag to Almansa and his squadron got underway, arriving at Rio de Janeiro in August 1867. The squadron again moved to the Rio de la Plata in November 1867. Navas de Tolosa later reconnoitered the Fernando de Noronha archipelago to see if enemy ships acquired in Europe were present there.

When Méndez Núñez received ordered to relinquish command of the squadron and return to Spain for a new assignment, he boarded Navas de Tolosa for the voyage. Navas de Tolosa departed Rio de Janeiro on 6 November 1868 to transport him to Spain, arriving on 15 December 1868 at Cádiz, where Méndez Núñez disembarked.

Navas de Tolosa′s next deployment was to Cuba, where the Ten Years' War broke out in 1868. While there, she supported Spanish forces against Cuban Liberation Army insurgents.

=== Cantonal Rebellion ===
King Amadeo I abdicated and the First Spanish Republic was proclaimed in February 1873. On 12 July 1873 the Canton of Cartagena declared its independence from the republic, beginning the Cantonal Rebellion. The central government regarded the Cantonalists as separatists, and combat broke out between it and the Cantonalists. Navas de Tolosa was in the Bay of Cádiz when the rebellion began, and took part in the defense of the Arsenal de La Carraca from Cantonalist forces. On 22 July she became the first Spanish Navy ship to fire at rebel forces, subsequently helping to put down the Cantonalist uprising in Cádiz by early August 1873.

On 5 October 1873, a central government squadron under the command of Contralmirante (Counter Admiral) Miguel Lobo y Malagamba and made up of Navas de Tolosa, Almansa, the armoured frigate Vitoria, the screw frigate Carmén, the paddle gunboats Colón and Ciudad de Cádiz, the screw corvette Diana, and the screw schooner Prosperidad, got underway from Gibraltar bound for Cartagena, Spain, intending to blockade the port. News of the passage of this squadron through Almería reached Cartagena on 9 October, and the Cantonalist forces there made plans to attack it. The Cantonalist squadron lacked naval officers, so a cavalry general, Juan Contreras y Román, took command of it. It consisted of the armoured frigates Numancia and Tetuán, the armoured corvette Méndez Núñez, and the paddle gunboat Despertador del Cantón (formerly named Fernando el Católico in Spanish Navy service).

On 10 October 1973, the central government squadron arrived off Cartagena. During the evening of 10 October, Lobo kept his ships just outside Cartagena's harbor off of Escombreras, an islet at the mouth of the harbor. Later, during the night of 10–11 October, he ordered his ships to raise sail, probably to economize on their use of coal, and a strong north wind blew his squadron offshore and eastward to a position east of Portmán, Spain.

The Cantonal squadron gathered on the morning of 11 October 1873 and got underway for the open sea at 10:30, escorted by five ships of the British Royal Navy, one of the Imperial German Navy, one of the Italian Regia Marina (Royal Navy), and one of the French Navy. At 11:30, the two squadrons sighted one another, with the Cantonal ships 3 nautical miles (5.6 km; 3.5 mi) due south of Cape Agua and Lobo's squadron about 6 nautical miles (11 km; 6.9 mi) to the south in waters east of Cape Negreti, and the Battle of Portmán began. Lobos, whose ships were in no particular order, ordered his squadron to turn to port with Vitoria in the lead. Numancia was faster than the other Cantonal ships, and she charged at Vitoria, racing ahead of the rest of her squadron. After exchanging fire with Vitoria, Numancia cut the central government line between Diana and Almansa, and crossed astern of Navas de Tolosa and Carmén. Navas de Tolosa and Carmén fired at her, but nearly all of their shots fell short, and Numancia set off in pursuit of Ciudad de Cádiz. Vitoria broke off to chase Numancia, leaving Navas de Tolosa, Almansa, and Carmén to face the approaching Méndez Núñez and Tetuán.

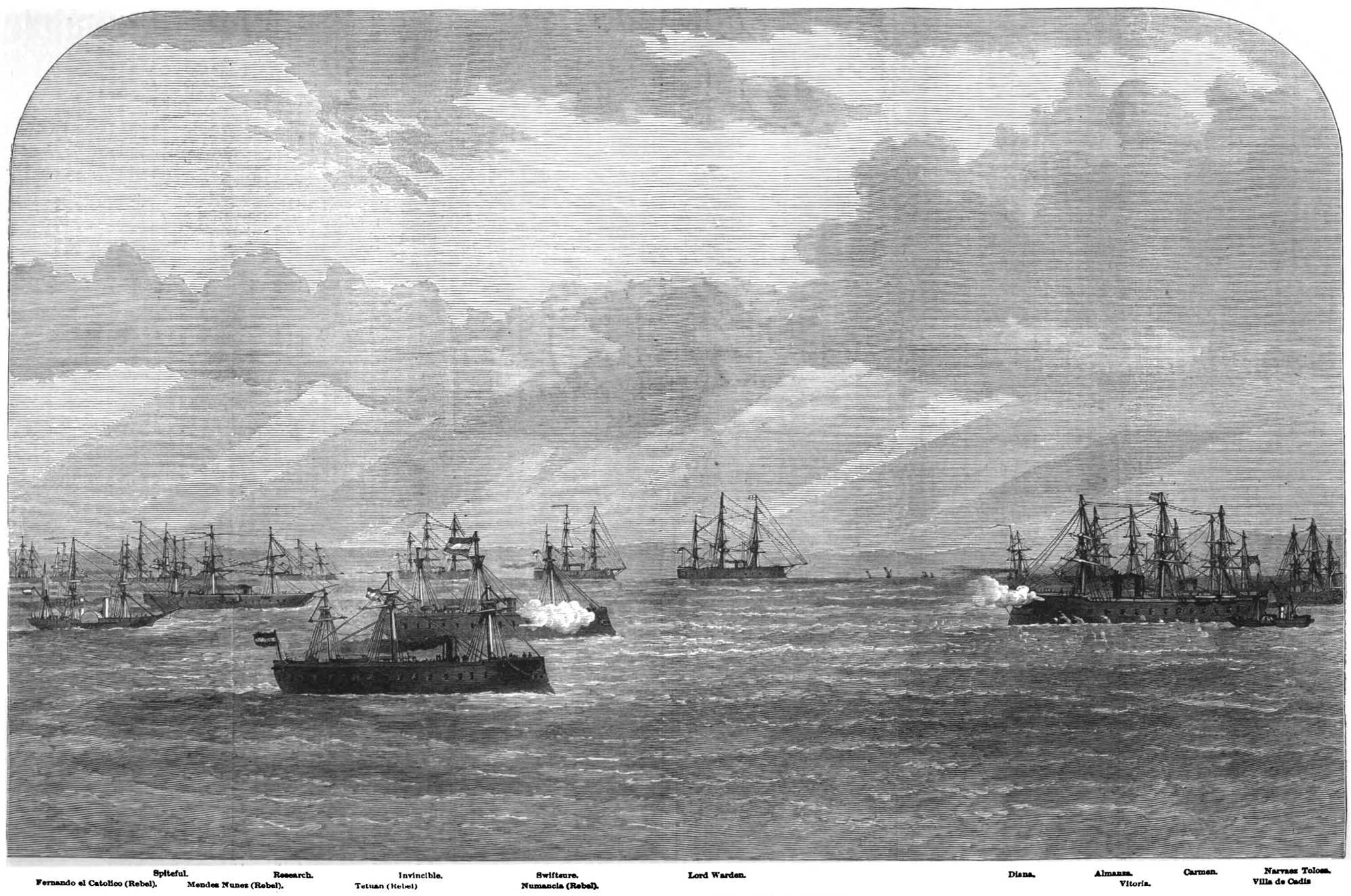
"The Civil War in Spain, the Battle of Escombrera, a naval battle off Carthagena." Illustration of the Battle of Portmán for The Illustrated London News on 1 November 1873. Navas de Tolosa is ninth from left.

Méndez Núñez opened fire on Almansa and Vitoria at very long range at 12:19, and most of the shots did not cover even half the distance to her targets, but she then closed with Carmén, and Méndez Núñez and Carmén scored hits on one another. Méndez Núñez then responded to an order to come to the assistance of Numancia, which was fleeing toward Cartagena with Vitoria in hot pursuit. Navas de Tolosa, Almansa, and Carmén were steering toward Cartagena in the wake of Numancia and Vitoria, putting them on a converging course with Méndez Núñez. They exchanged fire with Méndez Núñez at very long range, but most of the shots were wild and neither side suffered damage. Méndez Núñez and Numancia both reached safety in Cartagena's harbor under cover of the guns of the coastal forts. Meanwhile, Tetuán exchanged fire with Vitoria, then engaged Almansa, Carmén, and Navas de Tolosa and appeared to hit Almansa six times without receiving any damage in return. Passing Almansa, Carmén, and Navas de Tolosa, Tetuán steamed toward Diana, but upon discovering that the other Cantonal ships had fled, she turned around off Cape Negreti and slowly steamed back towards Cartagena, again engaging in succession Carmén, Almansa, and Navas de Tolosa. After a close-range exchange of fire with Vitoria, Tetuán gained the safety of the harbor, as did Despertador del Cantón.

The central government squadron had exhausted its ammunition, and at around 15:00 Lobo withdrew it to the east, bringing the battle to a close. In its immediate aftermath, the Cantonalists acknowledged that they had suffered 13 killed in action and 49 wounded, while Lobo claimed that his squadron had suffered no casualties, although one of his frigates reportedly withdrew eastward to "land the sick." Casualty figures eventually were revised to 12 dead and 38 wounded in the Cantonal squadron and 11 dead and 32 wounded on the central government side.

After the battle, the central government squadron tried to blockade Cartagena. However, when the Cantonal squadron sortied again on 13 October 1873, Vitoria had only enough coal for two days' steaming, and the Cantonal squadron, under a new commander, maintained a disciplined formation with Numancia remaining in her position in the line despite her higher speed than that of the other two Cantonal frigates. Rather than engage the Cantonalists, Lobo chose to withdraw the central government squadron toward Gibraltar, expecting to receive reinforcement of his squadron in the form of the armored frigate Zaragoza and the paddle gunboat Ulloa. This withdrawal led the central government to dismiss Lobo and replace him as commander of the central government squadron with Contralmirante (Counter Admiral) Nicolás Chicarro. Chicarro took command of the central government squadron on 18 October 1873 and reinstated the central government's blockade of Cartagena on 23 October 1873. Like Lobo, however, Chicarro avoided combat, despite the arrival of Zaragoza, which gave him a squadron that included two armored frigates.

The Cantonal Rebellion collapsed, and the Canton of Cartagena surrendered to central government forces on 12 January 1874. Cantonal leaders and about 1,750 soldiers, volunteers, and family members who had supported the rebellion boarded Numancia and the steamer Darro to flee Spain. At the time, Chicarro's central government squadron was blockading Cartagena, with Vitoria and Zaragoza in line ahead, Almansa and Carmén on either side, and Navas de Tolosa in reserve. As Numancia emerged from the harbor on 12 January, Vitoria and Zaragoza opened fire on her. She stopped her engines, which Chicarro interpreted as her surrendering to him, and he ordered his ships to cease fire and reduce speed. However, Numancia suddenly put on full speed, passed across the bows of Vitoria and opened fire, cutting between Carmén and Zaragoza. The central government squadron captured Darro, but Numancia reached the open sea and made for French Algeria with 2,000 people aboard, including 1,635 Cantonalist rebels as passengers. Almansa, Carmén, and Vitoria pursued Numancia, but she escaped and reached Mers El Kébir near Oran on 13 January 1874.

=== Later service ===
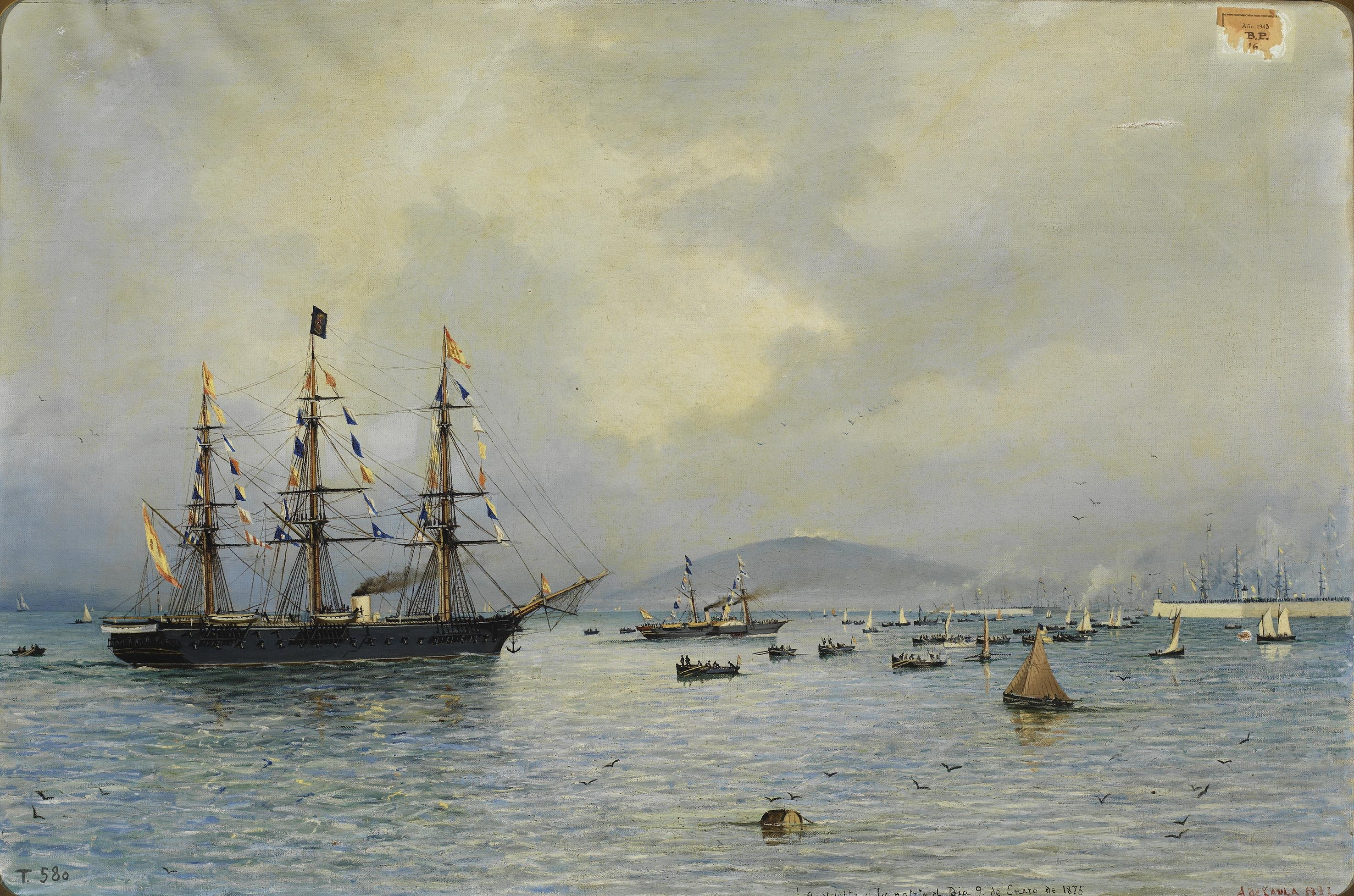
Navas de Tolosa arrives at Barcelona, Spain, with King Alfonso XII aboard on 9 January 1875.(Painting by Antonio Caula y Concejo)

The end of the First Spanish Republic and Restoration of the Spanish monarchy were proclaimed on 29 December 1874, and Alfonso XII became the king of Spain. On 5 January 1875, Navas de Tolosa departed Cartagena bound for Marseille, France, with Minister of the Navy Mariano Roca de Togores Carrasco, the Marquis of Molina, and several other government representatives aboard. Alfonso XII came aboard at Marseille, and Navas de Tolosa got back underway on 7 January to return to Spain, calling at Barcelona on 9 January and docking at Valencia on 11 January. Alfonso XII disembarked there and arrived in Madrid on 14 January to take the crown. As 1875 wore on, Navas de Tolosa operated in the Cantabrian Sea along the northern coast of Spain, taking part for a short period of time in the Third Carlist War.

On 29 January 1882, Navas de Tolosa arrived at Cádiz. She departed Cádiz on 1 March 1882 bound for Havana, which she reached on 6 April 1882. She got back underway in June 1882 for a journey to Chile and Peru. She arrived at Callao, Peru, to participate in the transfer of the remains of 43 Spaniards (two midshipmen, 33 sailors, and eight men of the Spanish Marine Infantry) killed in the Battle of Callao on 2 May 1866 during the Chincha Islands War. After a ceremony for the exhumation of the remains on 27 November 1882, they were taken from San Lorenzo Island off Callao to the cemetery in Lima, Peru, where a mausoleum had been built for them. Navas de Tolosa anchored at Montevideo, Uruguay, on 3 January 1884 and returned to Cádiz on 18 March 1884.

Navas de Tolosa arrived at Cádiz in such poor condition that the Spanish Navy decided to decommission her and issued orders on 22 September 1884 for her to be scrapped. In 1885 the Estado General de la Armada ("General State of the Navy") listed Navas de Tolosa as disarmed, but amid a crisis in which Spain feared a war with the German Empire over the status of the Caroline Islands in the Spanish East Indies, the Spanish Navy considered refitting her for service in September 1885. In the end no refit took place. She finally was decommissioned in April 1886. Thereafter she lay at the Arsenal de La Carraca. Included in the Estado General de la Armada ("General State of the Navy") among "ships unfit for service" in 1890, she was stricken from the naval register and scrapped in 1893.
