= Spanish ironclad Zaragoza =

Spanish ironclad

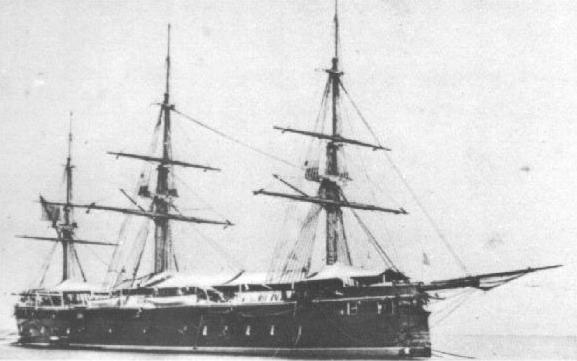
- Zaragoza at anchor

History

Spain
- Name: Zaragoza
- Namesake: Battle of Saragossa
- Ordered: 15 October 1860 (as wooden screw frigate); 26 June 1862 (as armored frigate)
- Builder: Arsenal de Cartagena, Cartagena, Spain
- Cost: 7,096,460 pesetas
- Way number: 1
- Laid down: 15 June 1861
- Launched: 6 February 1867
- Completed: 15 June 1868
- Commissioned: July 1868
- Decommissioned: 1890 or later (see text)
- Stricken: 1896 or 1897 (see text)
- Fate: Scrapped 1898 or scuttled 1899 (see text)

General characteristics (as built)
- Type: Broadside ironclad
- Displacement: 5,650 metric tons (5,560 long tons)
- Length: 85.4 m (280 ft 2 in)
- Beam: 16.6 m (54 ft 6 in)
- Draft: 7.5 m (25 ft)
- Installed power: 6 boilers; 3,000 ihp (2,200 kW)
- Propulsion: 1 shaft; trunk steam engine
- Sail plan: Ship rig
- Speed: about 8 knots (15 km/h; 9.2 mph)
- Complement: 548
- Armament: As built: 4 × 280 mm (11 in) smoothbore guns; 3 × 220 mm (8.7 in) smoothbore guns; 14 × 68-pounder 200 mm (7.9 in) smoothbore guns; 1883: 4 × 229 mm (9 in) Armstrong rifled guns; 3 x 180 mm (7.1 in) Palliser rifled guns; 8 x 160 mm (6.3 in) Palliser rifled guns; 6 x 120 mm (4.7 in) and 80 mm (3.1 in) guns (for boats)
- Armor: Belt: 102–127 mm (4.0–5.0 in); Battery: 114 mm (4.5 in); Barbettes: 100 mm (3.9 in)

Zaragoza was a Spanish Navy (Armada Real) wooden-hulled armored frigate completed in 1868. She was the flagship of rebel forces during the Glorious Revolution of 1868 and took part in the Ten Years War in Cuba from 1869 to 1872. She participated in central government operations against the Canton of Cartagena during the Cantonal Rebellion of 1873–1874. She later served as a training ship and was stricken from the naval register in 1897.

Zaragoza was named for the Battle of Saragossa, which took place in 1710 during the War of the Spanish Succession.

== Design and description ==
Zaragoza was 85.4 meters (280 ft 2 in) long at the waterline, had a beam of 16.6 meters (54 ft 6 in) and a draft of 7.5 meters (24 ft 7 in). She displaced 5,650 metric tons (5,561 long tons). Her crew consisted of 548 officers and enlisted men.

The ship was fitted with a pair of imported John Penn and Sons trunk steam engines that drove one propeller shaft using steam provided by six cylindrical boilers. The engines were rated at a total of 800 nominal horsepower or 3,000 indicated horsepower (2,200 kW) and gave Zaragosa a speed of 12.5 knots (23.2 km/h; 14.4 mph) The ironclad carried a maximum of 690 metric tons (679 long tons) of coal. She was fitted with a three-masted ship rig with a sail area of around 1,800–1,900 square meters (19,000–20,000 sq ft).

The frigate's main battery was originally intended to consist of thirty 200-millimeter (7.9 in) smoothbore guns mounted on the broadside, but she was completed with four 280-millimeter (11 in) and fourteen 200-millimeter guns, all smoothbores, on the gun deck. On the main deck above them were two 220-millimeter (8.7 in) smoothbores, one on each broadside, and another in the forecastle as the forward chase gun. By 1883, the smoothbore guns had been replaced by rifled muzzle-loading (RML) guns. Four Armstrong-Whitworth 229-millimeter (9.0 in) and eight 160-millimeter (6.3 in) Palliser guns were located on the gun deck and three 180-millimeter (7.1 in) Palliser guns were mounted on the main deck.

Zaragosa had a complete wrought iron waterline belt that ranged in thickness from 102 to 130 millimeters (4.0 to 5.1 in). Above the belt, the guns, except for the chase gun, were protected by 110-millimeter (4.3 in) armor plates. The ends of the ship and the deck were unarmored.

== Construction and commissioning ==
The Spanish government authorized the construction of Zaragoza as a sister ship of the wooden screw frigate Villa de Madrid on 15 October 1860, and her keel was laid on 15 June 15 1861 on Slipway No. 1 at the Arsenal de Cartagena in Cartagena, Spain. Work stopped on 22 April 1862, her construction as an armored frigate was authorized on 26 June 1862. Her construction period was lengthy, and she was not launched until 6 February 1867.

From 10 June to 27 June 1867, Zaragoza was on the floating Cartagena Iron Drydock, which had been commissioned only one year before. Zaragoza was not finally completed until 15 June 1868. She was commissioned in July 1868. Her construction cost was 7,096,460 pesetas.

== Service history ==
After commissioning, Zaragoza made one of her first voyages at the beginning of July 1868, proceeding from Cartagena to Cádiz. Soon thereafter she continued to the Cantabrian Sea in company with the paddle gunboat Colón and the screw schooner Caridad and arrived at Lequeitio on the northern coast of Spain, where Spanish monarchs spent their summers. She received a visit from Admiral Francisco de Paula Pavía, Captain General of the Department of Ferrol, and then on 22 August 1868 from Queen Isabella II, her husband Francisco de Asís, Duke of Cádiz, and the Prince of Asturias, the future King Alfonso XII. Zaragoza departed on 23 August and, after a stop at Ferrol, proceeded to Cádiz, which she reached on 5 September 1868.

Zaragoza was at Cádiz on 18 September 1868 when Brigadier Juan Bautista Topete and General Juan Prim rebelled against Isabella II there, beginning the Glorious Revolution. Zaragoza, under the command of Capitán de navío (Ship-of-the-Line Captain) José Malcampo y Monje, became the rebel flagship, and Topete announced the deposition of Isabella II from aboard her. On the morning of 23 September, Zaragoza got underway from Cádiz with Prim on board to promote the revolution, making stops at Tarifa, Algeciras, Ceuta, and Málaga. In company with the screw frigate Villa de Madrid, which also had joined the revolution, she next proceeded to Cartagena. She was at Cartagena on 29 September when rebel troops defeated royalist forces in the Battle of Alcolea, as a result of which Isabella II abdicated on 30 September 1868 and a provisional government was proclaimed. To support the new government, Zaragoza got underway from Cartagena on 2 October with Prim aboard, stopped at Valencia on the morning of 3 October, then put to sea again the same day and arrived at Barcelona on the evening of 3 October. On the morning of 4 October 1868 she reached Tarragona, where Prim and his staff disembarked for the overland journey to Madrid.

Zaragoza began an assignment to the Mediterranean Squadron in November 1868, and she became the squadron's flagship on 10 December 1868. The squadron, which also included Villa de Madrid, the armored frigate Tetuán, the screw frigate Gerona, the paddle gunboat Ciudad de Cádiz, and the screw schooner Ligera, arrived in Cádiz at the end of December 1868 to support operations against revolutionary insurgents. On 1 January 1869, the squadron bombarded several revolutionary areas in Málaga. The squadron returned to Cartagena on 30 January 1869 and then moved to Santa Pola, where it spent more than three months while its commander, Brigadier Juan Bautista Antequera y Bobadilla, dealt with several incidents of indiscipline that had occurred since the Glorious Revolution.

In November 1869 Zaragoza was assigned to the Caribbean, where she was based at Havana in the Captaincy General of Cuba. She supported Spanish Empire forces in combat against the Cuban Liberation Army during the Ten Years War, which had broken out in Cuba in October 1868. She operated in the Antilles until 1872, when the armored frigate Arapiles, relieved her at Havana. She made a voyage to Liverpool, England, then got back underway on 3 September 1872 and proceeded to Cádiz.

King Amadeo I of Spain abdicated and the First Spanish Republic was proclaimed in February 1873. On 12 July 1873 the Canton of Cartagena declared its independence from the republic, beginning the Cantonal Rebellion. The central government regarded the Cantonalists as separatists, and combat broke out between it and the Cantonalists. A central government squadron under the command of Contralmirante (Counter Admiral) Miguel Lobo y Malagamba blockaded Cartagena in October 1873, leading to the indecisive Battle of Portmán on 11 October when the Cantonal squadron sortied in an unsuccessful attempt to break the blockade. In mid-October 1873 the Spanish Navy ordered Zaragoza to reinforce Lobo's squadron, but she had not yet arrived when the Cantonal squadron again emerged, prompting Lobo to lift the blockade and withdraw. The Spanish government relieved Lobo of command and placed Contralmirante (Counter Admiral) Nicolás Chicarro in charge of the squadron. Reinforced by Zaragoza, Chicarro reinstated the blockade on 23 October 1873, but also generally avoided combat with Cantonal warships.

The Cantonal Rebellion collapsed, and the Canton of Cartagena surrendered to central government forces on 12 January 1874. Cantonal leaders and about 1,750 soldiers, volunteers, and family members who had supported the rebellion boarded the armored frigate Numancia and the steamer Darro to flee Spain. At the time, Chicarro's central government squadron was blockading Cartagena, with the armored frigate Vitoria and Zaragoza in line ahead, the screw frigates Almansa and Carmén on either side, and the screw frigate Navas de Tolosa in reserve. As Numancia emerged from the harbor on 12 January, Vitoria and Zaragoza opened fire on her. She stopped her engines, which Chicarro interpreted as her surrendering to him, and he ordered his ships to cease fire and reduce speed. However, Numancia suddenly put on full speed, passed across the bows of Vitoria and opened fire, cutting between Carmén and Zaragoza. The central government squadron captured Darro, but Numancia reached the open sea and made for French Algeria with 2,000 people aboard, including 1,635 Cantonalist rebels as passengers. Almansa, Carmén, and Vitoria pursued her, but she escaped and reached Mers El Kébir near Oran on 13 January 1874.

Between 1874 and 1876, Zaragoza underwent armament modifications, from which she emerged with four Armstrong 250-pounder (131 kg) rifled guns and ten Palliser 160-millimetre (6.3 in) rifled guns in her battery, two Palliser 180-millimetre (7.1 in) rifled guns in an armored redoubt on her deck, and one Palliser 180-millimetre (7.1 in) rifled gun on her bow, as well as six bronze 120-millimetre (4.7 in) and 80-millimetre (3.1 in) guns for disembarkation in her boats.

In 1880, Zaragoza began an assignment to the Training Squadron, commanded by Contralmirante (Counter Admiral) José Polo de Bernabé y Mordella. During the summer of 1881, Zaragoza and other ships of the squadron (Almansa, Carmén, Villa de Madrid, the armored frigate Sagunto, the screw corvette Tornado, the screw schooner Concordia, and the gunboat Pelícano) operated in the waters off Galicia during a visit to the Galician estuaries by King Alfonso XII and Queen Maria Christina. The squadron conducted maneuvers in their presence on 9 August, after which the monarchs and the Minister of the Navy, Admiral Francisco de Paula Pavía Pavía, embarked on Sagunto on 13 August and the squadron proceeded to La Coruña and then to Villagarcía de Arosa, which it reached on 15 August. On 18 August, the squadron departed Marín with the king and queen aboard Sagunto; the monarchs disembarked at Vigo on 19 August. On 25 August, the king and queen boarded Pelícano to visit Bayonne, France. Finally, Alfonso XII and Maria Christina concluded their visit to the squadron with a voyage to Santander aboard Sagunto, while Villa de Madrid remained behind at Vigo and Zaragoza and the rest of the ships proceeded to Ferrol at the end of August 1881.

In 1882 Zaragoza and Carmén made a voyage to several ports in the Eastern Mediterranean. The voyage included a visit to Egypt to protect Spanish access to the Suez Canal when British forces occupied Egypt during the Anglo-Egyptian War.

When a crisis with the German Empire over the status of the Caroline Islands in the Spanish East Indies arose in early 1886 and the Spanish Navy prepared a squadron for deployment to the Pacific Ocean to defend the islands, Zaragoza was at Cartagena awaiting drydocking for careening and the replacement of her boilers and was not part of the naval mobilization.

Sources present a confusing picture of Zaragoza′s subsequent history. According to one, she remained at Cartagena "awaiting her fate" after 1886 and was awaiting careening in 1890 when a Royal Order of 6 February 1890 designated her as the replacement for Tornado at the Torpedo School, although Zaragoza was decommissioned "a few months" later. She then remained in service, hulked in Cartagena as a floating jetty and then as a seaman's depot until 1897, when she was ordered to be sold. She was scrapped in 1898. According to another source, she underwent a major overhaul in 1889, was relegated to use as a torpedo training ship at Cartagena in 1892, was stricken in 1896, and was scuttled in 1899.
