= Spanish corvette Diana (1867) =

Spanish Navy screw corvette of 1867–1897

History

Spain
- Name: Diana
- Namesake: Diana, goddess of the countryside and nature, hunters, wildlife, childbirth, crossroads, the night, and the Moon in Roman mythology
- Builder: Arsenal de La Carraca, San Fernando, Spain
- Completed: 1867
- Commissioned: 1867
- Reclassified: Schooner 28 June 1880
- Fate: Hulked 1888
- Stricken: 1897

General characteristics
- Type: Screw corvette
- Displacement: 713 tonnes (702 long tons)
- Installed power: 160 hp (119 kW)
- Propulsion: Mixed sail and steam; One steam engine, one shaft
- Sail plan: Schooner rig
- Speed: 8 knots (15 km/h; 9.2 mph)
- Complement: 98 to 130
- Armament: 2 × 200 mm (7.9 in) 68-pounder smoothbore guns; 1 × 160 mm (6.3 in) 32-pounder smoothbore gun

Diana was a screw corvette of the Spanish Navy in commissioned in 1867 and stricken in 1897. She served under the Kingdom of Spain, as well as under the Provisional Government (1868–1871) that governed the country after the Glorious Revolution of 1868 and the First Spanish Republic (1873–1874). She saw combat in the Cantonal Rebellion of 1873–1874, including the Battle of Portmán in October 1873.

== Characteristics ==
Diana was a Narváez-class screw corvette with a wooden hull and a schooner rig, and because of the latter some sources list her as a schooner. She had three masts and a bowsprit. She displaced 713 tons. She had a 160-horsepower (119 kW) steam engine and could reach a maximum speed of 8 knots (15 km/h; 9.2 mph). Her armament consisted of two 68-pounder (31 kg) 200-millimetre (7.9 in) smoothbore guns amidships and a 32-pounder (14.5 kg) 160-millimetre (6.3 in) smoothbore swivel gun in a sliding mount on her bow. She had a crew of 98 to 130 men.

== Construction ==
Diana was constructed at the Arsenal de La Carraca in San Fernando, Spain, in 1867.

== Service history ==
=== Cantonal Rebellion ===
When the Cantonal Rebellion broke out in July 1873, Diana was at Cádiz. Supporting the central government of the First Spanish Republic, she participated in the defense of the Arsenal de La Carraca against Cantonalist rebels. Central government forces defeated the Cantonalist rebels in Cádiz in early August 1873.

As the rebellion continued, Diana became part of a central government squadron at Gibraltar under the command of Contralmirante (Counter Admiral) Miguel Lobo y Malagamba. With the Canton of Cartagena still in rebellion, the squadron — which also included the armored frigate Vitoria, the screw frigates Almansa, Carmén, and Navas de Tolosa, the paddle gunboats Colón and Ciudad de Cádiz, and the screw schooner Prosperidad — got underway from Gibraltar bound for Cartagena on 5 October 1873. News of the passage of this squadron through Almería, Spain, reached Cartagena on 9 October, and the Cantonalist forces there made plans to attack it with their own squadron, made up of the armored frigates Numancia and Tetuán, the armoured corvette Méndez Núñez, and the paddle gunboat Despertador del Cantón (formerly named Fernando el Católico in Spanish Navy service).

On 10 October 1973, the central government squadron arrived off Cartagena to establish a blockade. During the evening of 10 October, Lobo kept his ships just outside Cartagena's harbor off of Escombreras, an islet at the mouth of the harbor. Later, during the night of 10–11 October, he ordered his ships to raise sail, probably to economize on their use of coal, and a strong north wind blew his squadron offshore and eastward to a position east of Portmán.

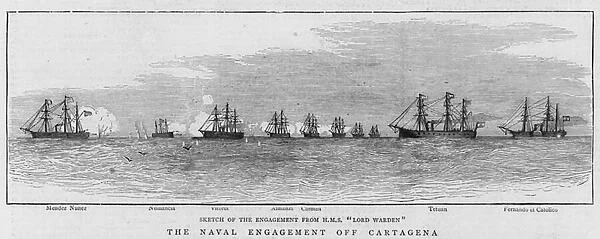
Numancia cutting through the central government line between Diana and Almansa. Engraving published in The Graphic on 25 October 1873.

The Cantonal ships gathered off Escombreras on 11 October between 07:00 and 09:00, and at 10:30 they got underway for the open sea. By 11:30, Numancia, Méndez Núñez, and Tetuán were in line abreast 3 nautical miles (5.6 km; 3.5 mi) due south of Cape Agua, with Méndez Núñez closest to shore, Numancia next, and Tetuán farthest to seaward, while Despertador del Cantón followed them. They sighted Lobo's squadron, which was about 6 nautical miles (11 km; 6.9 mi) to the south in waters east of Cape Negreti and in no particular order, and the Battle of Portmán began.

With her greater speed, Numancia charged toward Vitoria and got ahead of the rest of her squadron. The central government squadron turned to port and formed a line to face the attack, and Vitoria, which was leading the squadron, opened fire at Numancia with her bow guns at 12:10. The shots fell short, and Numancia rushed past Vitoria as the two ships exchanged broadsides. Numancia cut through the central government squadron's line between Diana and Almansa, then turned to starboard and crossed Carmén′s and Navas de Tolosa′s sterns as they fired at her, nearly all of their shots falling short. With this maneuver, Numancia cut off Ciudad de Cádiz from the rest of the central government squadron. Ciudad de Cádiz put on maximum sail and fled on an east-northeasterly wind with Numancia in hot pursuit. Ciudad de Cádiz outmaneuvered Numancia and escaped, passed south of Vitoria and the central government screw frigates, joined Diana, and then withdrew to a position several nautical miles away. Numancia also withdrew, reaching Cartagena safely, and Méndez Núñez also returned to Cartagena after exchanging fire with the central government squadron. Tetuán engaged the central government ships, then steamed toward Diana, but upon discovering that the other Cantonal ships had fled, she turned around off Cape Negreti and slowly steamed back towards Cartagena, firing at the central government screw frigates. With the Cantonalist squadron back in the harbor at Cartagena and the central government squadron out of ammunition, Lobo withdrew his ships to the east at around 15:00, bringing the battle to a close.

On 13 October 1873, the four Cantonalist ships again sortied from Cartagena with the screw schooner Buenaventura following at a distance. This time, Numancia held her position in the Canontalist formation, and when Tetuán opened fire on Lobo's blockading squadron Lobo avoided combat, lifted the blockade, and withdrew to the Bay of Gibraltar, hoping to receive reinforcements in the form of the armoured frigate Zaragoza and the paddle gunboat Ulloa. Outraged by Lobo's withdrawal, the central government relieved him of command on 15 October and replaced him with Contralmirante (Counter Admiral) Nicolás Chicarro, who took charge of the squadron on 18 October 1873. Chicarro reinstated the central government's blockade of Cartagena on 23 October 1873. Like Lobo, Chicarro avoided combat, despite the arrival of Zaragoza, which gave him a squadron that included two armored frigates.

The Cantonal Rebellion collapsed, and the Canton of Cartagena surrendered to central government forces on 12 January 1874. Chicarro's squadron entered the harbor at Cartagena on 20 January 1874.

=== Later service ===
Diana suffered serious damage in the Mediterranean Sea off Cartagena on 12 June 1876 and had to be towed into port. By a Royal Order of 28 June 1880 she was reclassified as a schooner and re-rated as a third-class vessel.

In early 1884, Diana was at the Arsenal de Cartagena in Cartagena having her boilers replaced when it was found that she needed more extensive repairs, and she was ordered scrapped that year. This was not carried out, and instead she was converted into an immobile pontoon, or floating jetty, anchored at Algeciras, Spain, in 1888.

== Disposal ==
Diana was stricken in 1897.
