= Lealtad =

Lealtad is Spanish for "loyalty" and may refer to:

- CD Lealtad, a Spanish football (soccer) team based in Villaviciosa, Spain
- Hacienda Lealtad, an historic coffee plantation in Puerto Rico
- Spanish ship Lealtad, various Spanish Navy ships
