= Spanish ironclad Tetuán =

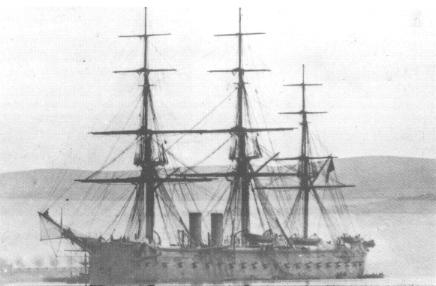
- Tetuan at anchor

History

Spain
- Name: Tetuán
- Namesake: Battle of Tétouan
- Ordered: 29 November 1860 (authorized)
- Builder: Reales Astilleros de Esteiro, Ferrol, Spain
- Cost: 6,772,256 pesetas
- Laid down: 22 May 1861
- Launched: 19 March 1863
- Completed: January 1866
- Acquired: 4 April 1866 (delivered)
- Commissioned: June 1866
- Fate: Burned and sank 30 December 1873
- Notes: Served Canton of Cartagena July–December 1873

General characteristics (as built)
- Type: Armored frigate
- Displacement: 6,200 long tons (6,300 t)
- Length: 279 ft 1 in (85.1 m)
- Beam: 55 ft 9 in (17.0 m)
- Draft: 21 ft 8 in (6.6 m)
- Installed power: 4,520 ihp (3,370 kW)
- Propulsion: 1 shaft, Trunk steam engine; 8 boilers
- Sail plan: Ship rig
- Speed: about 10 knots (19 km/h; 12 mph)
- Complement: 584
- Armament: 30 × 68-pounder smoothbore guns
- Armor: Belt: 130 mm (5.1 in); Battery: 130 mm (5.1 in)

Tetuán was a Spanish Navy armored frigate commissioned in 1866. She was the first ironclad warship constructed in a Spanish shipyard. She took part on the rebel side in the Glorious Revolution of 1868. She was captured by Cantonalist forces during the Cantonal Rebellion in 1873 and participated in the Battle of Portmán, fighting on the side of the Canton of Cartagena. While under repair after the battle, she was destroyed by fire in December 1873.

Tetuán was named for the Battle of Tétouan, an 1860 Spanish victory during the Hispano–Moroccan War of 1859–1860.

== Characteristics ==
Tetuán was 279 feet 1 inch (85.1 m) long at the waterline, had a beam of 55 feet 9 inches (17.0 m) and a draft of 21 feet 8 inches (6.6 m). The ship displaced 6,200 long tons (6,300 t). She had a single horizontal trunk steam engine that drove her propeller using steam provided by eight boilers. The engine was designed to produce a total of 4,520 indicated horsepower (3,370 kW) which gave the ship a speed of 10 knots (19 km/h; 12 mph). For long-distance travel, Tetuán was fitted with three masts and a full ship rig. She carried 1,200 long tons (1,219 t) of coal.

The ship was armed with thirty 68-pounder smoothbore guns. Her waterline and Battery were protected by 5.1 inches (130 mm) of wrought-iron armor.

== Construction and commissioning ==
Although the world's first armoured, iron-hulled warship, the British Royal Navy armoured frigate HMS Warrior, was not yet complete, the Spanish government decided on 4 October 1860 to build an armoured frigate in a Spanish shipyard. While the Ministry of the Navy's Directorate of Engineering drafted plans for the new ship, her construction was authorized on 29 November 1860.

The keel of the new ship, Tetuán, was laid at the Reales Astilleros de Esteiro (Esteiro Royal Dockyards) in Ferrol, Spain, on 22 May 1861. Spanish shipyards had no prior experience in constructing an armoured warship, and the novelty of building one for the first time led to a lengthy construction period. Tetuán was launched on 19 March 1863 and completed in January 1866. During a pre-commissioning test of her steam engines off Ferrol on 31 March 1866, Tetuán suffered damage when she struck rocks on the Palma shoal. At first the damage to her hull was not considered significant, and she was delivered to the Spanish Navy on 4 April 1866.

Tetuán was assigned to the Pacific Squadron, which was fighting under the command of Contralmirante (Counter Admiral) Casto Méndez Núñez in the southeastern Pacific Ocean in the Chincha Islands War against Bolivia, Chile, Ecuador, and Peru. She got underway from Ferrol on 6 April 1866 and proceeded to Cádiz, where it was discovered that her hull damage was greater than previously thought. As a result, she headed for Toulon, France, on 23 April for drydocking and hull repairs, as well as propulsion machinery improvements and a new propeller, alterations that improved her speed. After completion of the work, she departed Toulon on 30 May 1866 and proceeded to Cádiz, which she reached on 7 June 1866. She was commissioned in June 1866.

== Service history ==
=== 1866–1873 ===
By the time Tetuán entered service, the Pacific Squadron had withdrawn from the southeastern Pacific and was circumnavigating the world, making a voyage westward from the coast of Peru through the Pacific, Indian, and Atlantic Oceans to Rio de Janeiro, Brazil. She instead was assigned to duty in the Caribbean and departed Cádiz on 22 December 1866 bound for Havana in the Captaincy General of Cuba. After arriving there, she met Méndez Núñez's squadron, which arrived at Havana on 26 March 1867.

Tetuán conducted operations from Havana until 11 May 1868, when she got underway for New York City in the United States. She arrived there on the afternoon of 17 May 1868, then proceeded on 1 June 1868 to the New York Navy Yard in Brooklyn, New York, to have her bottom cleaned. After completion of the work, she returned to Spain, arriving at Cádiz on 15 July 1868.

Tetuán was at Cádiz when the Glorious Revolution began on 19 September 1868, and she joined the rebel naval forces commanded by Juan Bautista Topete. The revolution ended on 27 September 1868 in the deposition of Queen Isabella II and the proclamation of a Provisional Government.

Tetuán began an assignment to the Mediterranean Squadron in December 1868. On 18 November 1869, she arrived at Tangier to support Spanish claims against Sultan Muhammad IV of Morocco. She returned to Spain on 24 December 1869, arriving at Cartagena. On 16 March 1870 she arrived at Mahón on Menorca in the Balearic Islands with the rest of the squadron, then returned to Cartagena on 27 April 1870. She entered the Arsenal de Cartagena for modernization, during which several large-caliber rifled muzzle-loading Armstrong guns were installed, an armored redoubt was constructed on her deck, and almost all of her rigging was removed.

=== Cantonal Rebellion ===
King Amadeo I of Spain abdicated and the First Spanish Republic was proclaimed in February 1873. On 12 July 1873 the Canton of Cartagena declared its independence from the republic, beginning the Cantonal Rebellion. The central government regarded the Cantonalists as separatists, and combat broke out between it and the Cantonalists. At the time, Tetuán was lying disarmed at the Arsenal de Cartagena, awaiting the installation of new guns, and came under the control of the Cantonalists, who hastily returned her to service. On 20 July 1873, the central government of the First Spanish Republic declared that ships flying the red flag of the Canton were pirates, and other naval powers made similar declarations and sent warships to Spanish waters to protect their interests.

Tetuán, the armoured frigate Numancia, and the paddle gunboat Fernando el Católico departed Cartagena on 25 August 1873. In the days that followed, they cruised off Almería and Alicante but did not encounter any central government ships. Tetuán, Numancia, and the armoured frigate Méndez Núñez bombarded Alicante on 27 September 1873, firing a combined 500 rounds. During the bombardment, Tetuán sprang an accidental leak, and Fernando el Católico had to tow her back to Cartagena, where she entered drydock at the Arsenal de Cartagena for repairs. At the beginning of October 1873, Tetuán and Fernando el Católico got underway from Cartagena and, without any opposition from the central government fleet, conducted landings at Garrucha, Cuevas, Mojácar, and Torre-Pacheco.

The central government squadron, under command of Contralmirante (Counter Admiral) Miguel Lobo y Malagamba and composed of the armoured frigate Vitoria, the screw frigates Almansa, Carmén, and Navas de Tolosa, the paddle gunboats Colón and Ciudad de Cádiz, the screw corvette Diana, and the screw schooner Prosperidad, got underway from Gibraltar bound for Cartagena on 5 October 1873. News of the passage of this squadron through Almería reached Cartagena on 9 October, and the Cantonalist forces made plans to attack it. The Canton lacked naval officers, so a cavalry general, Juan Contreras y Román, took command of the Canton's squadron, which consisted of Tetuán, Numancia, Méndez Núñez, and Despertador del Cantón (the former Fernando el Católico).

On 10 October 1873, the central government squadron arrived off Cartagena to establish a blockade. During the evening of 10 October, Lobo kept his ships just outside Cartagena's harbor off of Escombreras, an islet at the mouth of the harbor. Later, during the night of 10–11 October, he ordered his ships to raise sail, probably to economize on their use of coal, and a strong north wind blew his squadron offshore and eastward to a position east of Portmán, Spain.

Flying the same flag of Spain as the central government squadron rather than the red Cantonal flag to avoid international antipiracy actions against its ships, the Cantonal squadron gathered on the morning of 11 October 1873 and got underway for the open sea at 10:30, escorted by five ships of the British Royal Navy, one of the Imperial German Navy, one of the Italian Regia Marina (Royal Navy), and one of the French Navy. At 11:30, the two squadrons sighted one another, with the Cantonal ships 3 nautical miles (5.6 km; 3.5 mi) due south of Cape Agua and Lobo's squadron about 6 nautical miles (11 km; 6.9 mi) to the south in waters east of Cape Negreti, and the Battle of Portmán began. Lobo, whose ships were in no particular order, ordered his squadron to turn to port with Vitoria in the lead. Numancia was faster than the other Cantonal ships, and she charged at Vitoria, racing ahead of the rest of her squadron. After exchanging fire with Vitoria, Numancia cut the central government line between Diana and Almansa, crossed astern of Carmén and Navas de Tolosa, and set off in pursuit of Ciudad de Cádiz. Vitoria broke off to chase Numancia, leaving Almansa, Carmén, and Navas de Tolosa to face the approaching Tetuán and Méndez Núñez.

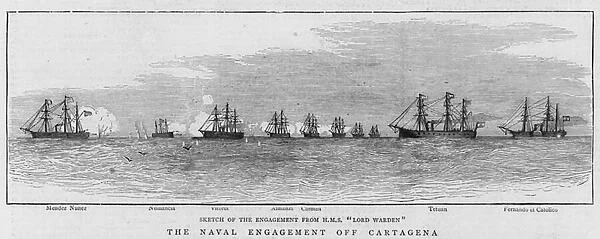
"The Naval Engagement off Cartagena." Drawing of the Battle of Portman published in The Graphic on 25 October 1873. Tetuán is sixth from left.

Méndez Núñez opened fire on Almansa and Vitoria at very long range at 12:19, and most of the shots did not cover even half the distance to her targets, but she then closed with Carmén, and Méndez Núñez and Carmén scored hits on one another. Méndez Núñez then responded to an order to come to the assistance of Numancia, which was fleeing toward Cartagena with Vitoria in hot pursuit. Almansa, Carmén, and Navas de Tolosa were steering toward Cartagena in the wake of Numancia and Vitoria, putting them on a converging course with Méndez Núñez. They exchanged fire with Méndez Núñez at very long range, but most of the shots were wild and neither side suffered damage. Méndez Núñez and Numancia both reached safety in Cartagena's harbor under cover of the guns of the coastal forts.

At 12:20, Tetuán was about 4 nautical miles (7.4 km; 4.6 mi) south by east of Cape Agua. Steaming very slowly eastward, she crossed the track of Méndez Núñez and exchanged fire with Vitoria. One of Vitoria′s shots landed in the water just under Tetuán′s bows, prompting a crowd of sailors to flee Tetuán′s forecastle. Another of Vitoria′s shots caused Tetuán′s crew to evacuate her bridge. Tetuán nonetheless engaged Almansa, Carmén, and Navas de Tolosa and appeared to hit Almansa six times without receiving any damage in return. Passing Almansa, Carmén, and Navas de Tolosa, she steamed toward Diana, but upon discovering that the other Cantonal ships had fled, she turned around off Cape Negreti and slowly steamed back towards Cartagena, again engaging in succession Carmén, Almansa, and Navas de Tolosa. At 14:00, with Numancia and Méndez Núñez having just escaped into the harbor after avoiding being cut off by Vitoria, Tetuán was just off the entrance to the harbor with Vitoria approaching from the south. Vitoria probably intended to ram Tetuán, but the French armoured corvette Thétis, which had made sail after suffering a mechanical breakdown, inadvertently sailed in between them. With shots from both sides passing through her topsails, Thétis maneuvered to extricate herself from her predicament while Tetuán took advantage of the situation to steam to the west of Vitoria, closer to the guns of Cartagena's coastal forts. By the time Thetis was clear, Tetuán′s port bow was towards Vitoria′s starboard bow. Vitoria was traveling at a greater speed, and she crossed Tetuán′s bow as Tetuán steamed ahead. Both ships then turned to starboard and exchanged starboard broadsides on opposite headings at a range of under 400 yards (370 m). Vitoria scored hits that passed right through Tetuán and then, although the central government claimed she sustained no damage, broke off the engagement, steamed out to sea, and went dead in the water for at least an hour. Meanwhile, Tetuán fired a gun toward Numancia to signal Numancia for support, but Numancia stood out of the harbor for only a few minutes before again withdrawing. Tetuán gained the safety of the harbor, as did Despertador del Cantón.

The central government squadron had exhausted its ammunition, and at around 15:00 Lobo withdrew it to the east, bringing the battle to a close. In its immediate aftermath, the Cantonalists acknowledged that they had suffered 13 killed in action and 49 wounded, while Lobo claimed that his squadron had suffered no casualties, although one of his frigates reportedly withdrew eastward to "land the sick." Casualty figures eventually were revised to 12 dead and 38 wounded in the Cantonal squadron and 11 dead and 32 wounded on the central government side.

After the battle, the central government squadron tried to blockade Cartagena. However, when the Cantonal squadron sortied again on 13 October 1873, Vitoria had only enough coal for two days' steaming, and the Cantonal squadron, under a new commander, maintained a disciplined formation with Numancia remaining her position in the line despite her higher speed than that of the other two Cantonal frigates. After Tetuán opened fire at his squadron at 14:00, Lobo chose to withdraw to the east and then toward Gibraltar rather than engage the Cantonalists, expecting to receive reinforcement of his squadron in the form of the armored frigate Zaragoza and the paddle gunboat Ulloa. This withdrawal led the central government to dismiss Lobo and replace him as commander of the central government squadron with Contralmirante (Counter Admiral) Nicolás Chicarro.

Tetuán, Méndez Núñez, 'Numancia, and Despertador del Cantón departed Cartagena on 17 October 1873 to transport several Cantonal leaders to Valencia and Barcelona. During the voyage, Numancia collided with Despertador del Cantón off Alicante on either 19 or 20 October, according to different sources, and Despertador del Cantón sank with the loss of 12 lives and injuries to 17 others. After the accident, Tetuán, Méndez Núñez, and Numancia returned to Cartagena.

Chicarro took command of the central government squadron on 18 October 1873 and reinstated the central government's blockade of Cartagena on 23 October 1873. Like Lobo, however, Chicarro avoided combat, despite the arrival of Zaragoza, which gave him a squadron that included two armored frigates.

== Loss and final disposition ==
Tetuán was under repair at Cartagena when at about 11:00 on 30 December 1873 a fire started while gunpowder was being brought aboard. Tetuán′s crew quickly extinguished it, but it rekindled that afternoon and went out of control. People crowded the docks to watch the fire until some of Tetuán′s smaller stores of ammunition and gunpowder began to explode. Her crew abandoned ship, and many launches, boats, and other vessels picked up crewmen who had jumped into the water. Her crew suffered only two casualties. Fortunately for Cartagena, she sank before her ammunition magazine could explode; if it had exploded, it probably would have inflicted substantial damage on a large portion of the city.

An investigation into Tetuán′s loss concluded that a stoker had started the fire deliberately. Others were implicated, but a lack of evidence and a desire to bring the matter to a conclusion without further ill feeling prompted the investigators to take the matter no further.

After the Cantonal Rebellion collapsed with the surrender of the Canton of Cartagena to central government forces on 12 January 1874, the central government took possession of the wreck. A salvage effort recovered several iron plates which were used in the construction of the floating battery Duque de Tetuán at the Reales Astilleros de Esteiro at Ferrol. Between January 1877 and January 1879, some additional materials were recovered. Finally what remained of the wreck was demolished with explosives to clear the port.
