= Spanish frigate Nuestra Señora del Carmén =

Spanish Navy screw frigate of 1862–1893

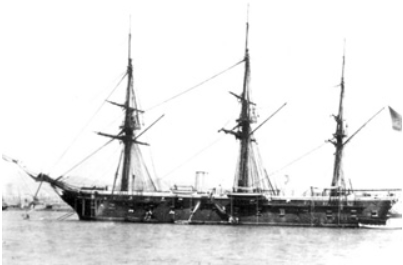

History

Armada Española Ensign First Spanish Republic
- Name: Nuestra Señora del Carmén
- Namesake: Our Lady of Mount Carmel
- Ordered: 1858 (authorized)
- Builder: Arsenal de Cartagena, Cartagena, Spain
- Cost: 2,753,318.16 pesetas
- Laid down: 19 November 1859
- Launched: 4 October 1861
- Commissioned: 1862
- Renamed: Carmén October 1868
- Namesake: Mount Carmel
- Reclassified: Training ship 10 August 1880
- Decommissioned: 1893
- Fate: Sold for scrapping 1897

General characteristics
- Type: Screw frigate
- Displacement: 3,116 t (3,067 long tons)
- Length: 70 m (229 ft 8 in)
- Beam: 14 m (45 ft 11 in)
- Draft: 6.40 m (21 ft 0 in)
- Depth: 7.02 m (23 ft 0 in)
- Installed power: 600 hp (447 kW) (nominal)
- Propulsion: One John Penn and Sons steam engine, four boilers, one shaft; 430 tons coal
- Speed: 13 knots (24 km/h; 15 mph)
- Complement: 500
- Armament: As built: 20 x 68-pounder (31 kg) 200 mm (7.9 in) smoothbore guns; 3 x 32-pounder (14.5 kg) 160 mm (6.3 in) smoothbore guns; 6 x 32-pounder (14.5 kg) 160 mm (6.3 in) rifled guns; 4 x smaller bronze guns; ca. 1869: 1 x 220 mm (8.7 in) swivel gun; 20 x 68-pounder (31 kg) 200 mm (7.9 in) smoothbore guns; 4 x 32-pounder (14.5 kg) 160 mm (6.3 in) rifled guns; 1885: 12 x 68-pounder (31 kg) 200 mm (7.9 in) smoothbore guns; 4 x 80 mm (3.1 in) rifled guns; 1886: Disarmed

Nuestra Señora del Carmén was a Spanish Navy Concepción-class screw frigate commissioned in 1862. She was named for Our Lady of Mount Carmel, the patron saint of the Spanish Navy. She operated in the Caribbean during the Chincha Islands War of 1865–1866, and after the Glorious Revolution of 1868 her name was changed to Carmén. She fought on the central government side during the Cantonal Rebellion of 1873–1874, taking part in the Battle of Portmán in 1873, and participated in the Spanish–Moro conflict in the Philippines in 1876. She was disarmed in 1886, decommissioned in 1893, and sold for scrapping in 1897.

== Characteristics ==
Nuestra Señora del Carmén was a Concepción-class frigate screw frigate with a wooden hull. She had three masts and a bowsprit. She displaced 3,116 tons. She was 70 metres (229 ft 8 in) long, 14 metres (45 ft 11 in) in beam, 7.02 metres (23 ft 0 in) in depth, and 6.40 metres (21 ft 0 in) in draft. She had a John Penn and Sons steam engine rated at a nominal 600 horsepower (447 kW) which, with her four boilers, gave her a speed of 13 knots (24 km/h; 15 mph). She could carry up to 430 tons of coal. Her armament consisted of twenty 68-pounder (31 kg) 200-millimetre (7.9 in) smoothbore guns, three 32-pounder (14.5 kg) 160-millimetre (6.3 in) smoothbore guns, six 32-pounder (14.5 kg) 160-millimetre (6.3 in) rifled guns, and four smaller bronze guns. She had a crew of 500 men.

== Construction and commissioning ==
Nuestra Señora del Carmén′s construction was authorized in 1858. Her keel was laid at the Arsenal de Cartagena in Cartagena, Spain, on 19 November 1859. She was launched on 4 October 1861 and commissioned in 1862. Her construction cost was 2,753,318.16 pesetas.

== Service history ==
=== 1862–1873 ===
Nuestra Señora del Carmén′s first assignment was to the Training Squadron. It was dissolved on 12 June 1862, and she subsequently underwent repairs at the Arsenal de La Carraca in San Fernando, Spain.

Nuestra Señora del Carmén was stationed along with the screw frigate Lealtad at Havana in the Captaincy General of Cuba during the Chincha Islands War of 1865–1866. After its conclusion, she had her armament altered at the Arsenal de Ferrol at Ferrol, Spain, leaving her with one 220-millimetre (8.7 in) swivel gun on her bow, twenty 68-pounder (31 kg) 200-millimetre (7.9 in) smoothbore guns, and four 32-pounder (14.5 kg) 160-millimetre (6.3 in) rifled guns. The Glorious Revolution of 19–27 September 1868 resulted in the deposition of Queen Isabella II and the proclamation of a provisional government; under the new government, some Spanish Navy ships underwent name changes including Nuestra Señora del Carmén, whose name became Carmén.

=== Cantonal Rebellion ===
King Amadeo I abdicated and the First Spanish Republic was proclaimed in February 1873. On 12 July 1873 the Canton of Cartagena declared its independence from the republic, beginning the Cantonal Rebellion. The central government regarded the Cantonalists as separatists, and combat broke out between it and the Cantonalists. On 13 August 1873, Carmén became part of the central government squadron under the command of Contralmirante (Counter Admiral) Miguel Lobo y Malagamba.

On 5 October 1873, Lobo's squadron — made up of Carmén, the armoured frigate Vitoria, the screw frigates Almansa and Navas de Tolosa, the paddle gunboats Colón and Ciudad de Cádiz, the screw corvette Diana, and the screw schooner Prosperidad — got underway from Gibraltar bound for Cartagena, Spain, intending to blockade the port. News of the passage of this squadron through Almería reached Cartagena on 9 October, and the Cantonalist forces there made plans to attack it. The Cantonalist squadron lacked naval officers, so a cavalry general, Juan Contreras y Román, took command of it. It consisted of the armoured frigates Numancia and Tetuán, the armoured corvette Méndez Núñez, and the paddle gunboat Despertador del Cantón (formerly named Fernando el Católico in Spanish Navy service).

On 10 October 1873, the central government squadron arrived off Cartagena. During the evening of 10 October, Lobo kept his ships just outside Cartagena's harbor off of Escombreras, an islet at the mouth of the harbor. Later, during the night of 10–11 October, he ordered his ships to raise sail, probably to economize on their use of coal, and a strong north wind blew his squadron offshore and eastward to a position east of Portmán, Spain.

The Cantonal squadron gathered on the morning of 11 October 1873 and got underway for the open sea at 10:30, escorted by five ships of the British Royal Navy, one of the Imperial German Navy, one of the Italian Regia Marina (Royal Navy), and one of the French Navy. At 11:30, the two squadrons sighted one another, with the Cantonal ships 3 nautical miles (5.6 km; 3.5 mi) due south of Cape Agua and Lobo's squadron about 6 nautical miles (11 km; 6.9 mi) to the south in waters east of Cape Negreti, and the Battle of Portmán began. Lobos, whose ships were in no particular order, ordered his squadron to turn to port with Vitoria in the lead. Numancia was faster than the other Cantonal ships, and she charged at Vitoria, racing ahead of the rest of her squadron. After exchanging fire with Vitoria, Numancia cut the central government line between Diana and Almansa, and crossed astern of Navas de Tolosa and Carmén. Navas de Tolosa and Carmén fired at her, but nearly all of their shots fell short, and Numancia set off in pursuit of Ciudad de Cádiz. Vitoria broke off to chase Numancia, leaving Navas de Tolosa, Almansa, and Carmén to face the approaching Méndez Núñez and Tetuán.

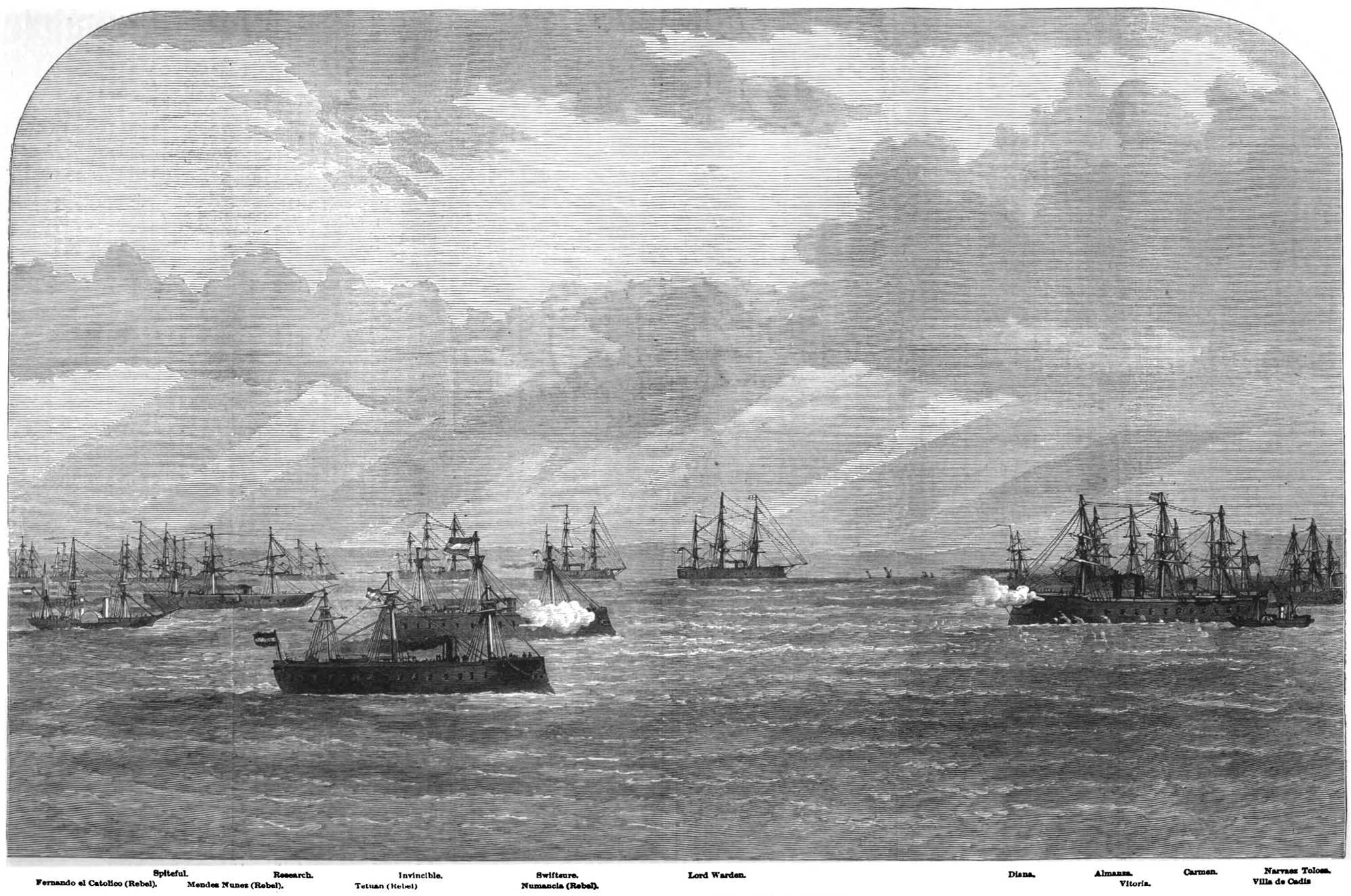
"The Civil War in Spain, the Battle of Escombrera, a naval battle off Carthagena." Illustration of the Battle of Portmán for The Illustrated London News on 1 November 1873. Carmén is eighth from left.

Méndez Núñez opened fire on Almansa and Vitoria at very long range at 12:19, and most of the shots did not cover even half the distance to her targets, but she then closed with Carmén, and Méndez Núñez and Carmén scored hits on one another. Méndez Núñez then responded to an order to come to the assistance of Numancia, which was fleeing toward Cartagena with Vitoria in hot pursuit. Navas de Tolosa, Almansa, and Carmén were steering toward Cartagena in the wake of Numancia and Vitoria, putting them on a converging course with Méndez Núñez. They exchanged fire with Méndez Núñez at very long range, but most of the shots were wild and neither side suffered damage. Méndez Núñez and Numancia both reached safety in Cartagena's harbor under cover of the guns of the coastal forts. Meanwhile, Tetuán exchanged fire with Vitoria, then engaged Almansa, Carmén, and Navas de Tolosa and appeared to hit Almansa six times without receiving any damage in return. Passing Almansa, Carmén, and Navas de Tolosa, Tetuán steamed toward Diana, but upon discovering that the other Cantonal ships had fled, she turned around off Cape Negreti and slowly steamed back towards Cartagena, again engaging in succession Carmén, Almansa, and Navas de Tolosa. After a close-range exchange of fire with Vitoria, Tetuán gained the safety of the harbor, as did Despertador del Cantón.

The central government squadron had exhausted its ammunition, and at around 15:00 Lobo withdrew it to the east, bringing the battle to a close. In its immediate aftermath, the Cantonalists acknowledged that they had suffered 13 killed in action and 49 wounded, while Lobo claimed that his squadron had suffered no casualties, although one of his frigates reportedly withdrew eastward to "land the sick." Casualty figures eventually were revised to 12 dead and 38 wounded in the Cantonal squadron and 11 dead and 32 wounded on the central government side.

After the battle, the central government squadron tried to blockade Cartagena. However, when the Cantonal squadron sortied again on 13 October 1873, Vitoria had only enough coal for two days' steaming, and the Cantonal squadron, under a new commander, maintained a disciplined formation with Numancia remaining in her position in the line despite her higher speed than that of the other two Cantonal frigates. Rather than engage the Cantonalists, Lobo chose to withdraw the central government squadron toward Gibraltar, expecting to receive reinforcement of his squadron in the form of the armored frigate Zaragoza and the paddle gunboat Ulloa. This withdrawal led the central government to dismiss Lobo and replace him as commander of the central government squadron with Contralmirante (Counter Admiral) Nicolás Chicarro. Chicarro took command of the central government squadron on 18 October 1873 and reinstated the central government's blockade of Cartagena on 23 October 1873. Like Lobo, however, Chicarro avoided combat, despite the arrival of Zaragoza, which gave him a squadron that included two armored frigates.

The Cantonal Rebellion collapsed, and the Canton of Cartagena surrendered to central government forces on 12 January 1874. Cantonal leaders and about 1,750 soldiers, volunteers, and family members who had supported the rebellion boarded Numancia and the steamer Darro to flee Spain. At the time, Chicarro's central government squadron was blockading Cartagena, with Vitoria and Zaragoza in line ahead, Almansa and Carmén on either side, and Navas de Tolosa in reserve. As Numancia emerged from the harbor on 12 January, Vitoria and Zaragoza opened fire on her. She stopped her engines, which Chicarro interpreted as her surrendering to him, and he ordered his ships to cease fire and reduce speed. However, Numancia suddenly put on full speed, passed across the bows of Vitoria and opened fire, cutting between Carmén and Zaragoza. The central government squadron captured Darro, but Numancia reached the open sea and made for French Algeria with 2,000 people aboard, including 1,635 Cantonalist rebels as passengers. Almansa, Carmén, and Vitoria pursued Numancia, but she escaped and reached Mers El Kébir near Oran on 13 January 1874.

=== 1874–1897 ===
Carmén next deployed to the Captaincy General of the Philippines in the Spanish East Indies. On 5 February 1876, Contralmirantes (Counter Admirals) José Malcampo, the Captain General of the Philippines, and Manuel de la Pezuela, commander of the Cavite Naval Base, boarded Carmén at Manila on Luzon and she proceeded to Zamboanga on Mindanao, where a Spanish Navy squadron gathered for an expedition against the Jolo pirates during the Spanish–Moro conflict. Carmén served as squadron flagship. After the occupation of Jolo on 2 April 1876, Carmén returned to Manila. The screw corvette Doña María de Molina relieved Carmén on the Philippines station in March 1878, and Carmén returned to Spain that year.

A Royal Order of 10 August 1880 made Carmén a training ship for midshipmen, and that year she became part of the Training Squadron, which was under the overall command of Contralmirante (Counter Admiral) José Polo de Bernabé. In August 1881, Carmén and other ships of the Training Squadron escorted the armoured frigate Sagunto as Sagunto carried King Alfonso XII and Queen Maria Christina on a voyage along the coast of Galicia. On 12 August 1881, Carmén and the rest of the squadron were present at Ferrol for the laying of the keels of the steel-hulled unprotected cruisers Reina Cristina and Alfonso XII.

In 1882, Carmén was part of the Training Squadron under the overall command of Contralmirante (Counter Admiral) Luis Bula y Vázquez. She and Zaragoza visited Egypt that year to protect Spanish access to the Suez Canal when British forces occupied Egypt during the Anglo-Egyptian War. On 22 November 1883 the Imperial German Navy corvette SMS Prinz Adalbert arrived at Valencia with the German Crown Prince Frederick on board, accompanied by the corvette SMS Sofía and the aviso SMS Loreley. The ships of the Training Squadron — Carmén, Lealtad, Numancia, and Vitoria — escorted the German ships.

In the summer of 1884, Carmén was part of a Training Squadron commanded by Contralmirante (Counter Admiral) Francisco de Paula Llanos y Herrera. King Alfonso XII and Queen Maria Christina embarked on Vitoria on 19 August 1884 for a voyage from Gijón to La Coruña and Ferrol escorted by Carmen, Numancia, Lealtad, and the gunboat Paz. The unprotected cruiser Navarra joined the squadron at Ferrol, and the ships continued the journey along the coast of Spain until Alfonso XII and Maria Christina disembarked at Vigo on 25 August 1884.

By 1885, Carmén′s armament had been reduced to twelve 200-millimetre (7.9 in) smootbore guns and four 80-millimetre (3.1 in) rifled guns. Although still serving as a training ship, she received orders that year to concentrate with other Training Squadron ships at Mahón on Menorca in the Balearic Islands during a crisis with the German Empire over the status of the Caroline Islands in the Spanish East Indies. The ships had orders to prepare to either steam to the Pacific to defend the Carolines or to defend the Balearics in case Germany tried to seize them as a bargaining chip in future negotiations over the status of the Carolines. In the end, no conflict broke out between Spain and Germany. In 1886, the screw frigate Blanca replaced Carmén as the midshipmen training ship and Carmén was disarmed.

On 6 January 1889, Carmén sustained serious damage to her hull, rigging, and machinery in a strong storm about 30 nautical miles (56 km; 35 mi) from Europa Point, leaving her disabled. After 48 hours in distress, she asked a passing British merchant ship to tow her to Gibraltar. The British captain demanded 75,000 pesetas for the tow, which Carmén′s commanding officer turned down, but Carmén managed to reach Puente Mayorga, Spain, on her own on 10 January. The unprotected cruiser Castilla was summoned from Mahón and the Compañía Transatlántica steamer Satrustegui from Cádiz to assist her, and Castilla towed her from Puente Mayorga to Cádiz, which the ships reached on 15 January 1889.

== Decommissioning and disposal ==
Carmén was decommissioned in 1893. She was sold for scrapping in 1897.
