= Spanish ironclad Duque de Tetuán =

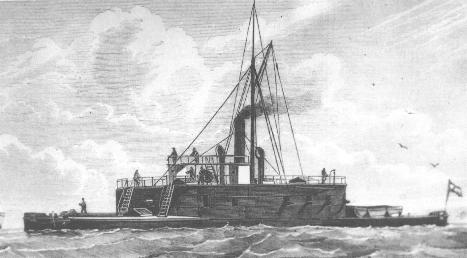

History

Spain
- Name: Duque de Tetuán
- Namesake: Leopoldo O'Donnell, 1st Duke of Tetuan
- Builder: Reales Astilleros de Esteiro
- Commissioned: 1874
- Decommissioned: 1897
- Recommissioned: 1898
- Decommissioned: 1900
- Fate: Scrapped 1900

General characteristics
- Type: floating battery
- Displacement: 703 tons
- Length: 43 m (141 ft)
- Beam: 9.5 m (31 ft)
- Draft: 2.15 m (7.1 ft)
- Installed power: 190 ihp
- Speed: 6 knots
- Complement: 60 officers and enlisted
- Armament: 1 × 16 cm (6.30 in) cannon; 4 × 12 cm (4.72 in) cannons
- Armor: 100 mm (3.9 in) iron
- Notes: 21 tons of coal

The floating battery Duque de Tetuán was an ironclad warship, a low-freeboard vessel similar in design to a monitor, of the Spanish Navy, and was constructed during the Third Carlist War to provide coastal defense and fire support for troops ashore. Completed after the end of the conflict for which it was designed, the ship was assigned to the defense of Ferrol. It remained in this duty, though briefly decommissioned in 1897, until it was decommissioned and scrapped in 1900.

== Design ==
Designed and constructed by the Reales Astilleros de Esteiro at Ferrol to meet an Armada requirement for a floating battery capable of providing gunfire support to troops ashore during the Third Carlist War, Duque de Tetuán was of wooden construction, its hull plated with iron armor 100 millimetres (3.9 in) thick. Some of the armor plate used in the construction of Duque de Tetuán came from the earlier armoured frigate Tetuan, which had burned under suspicious circumstances during the Cantonist rebellion at Cartagena.

Armament consisted of a single 160-millimetre (6.3 in) cannon, and four 120-millimetre (4.7 in) rifled cannon. The construction of Duque de Tetuán took place at Cartagena, and the incomplete vessel was among the vessels captured by the rebel forces when they seized the city.

== Career ==
Despite the urgent need for such a vessel to provide fire support in the government's campaign against the Carlists, Duque de Tetuán was not completed in time to participate in the war. Of little use in any offensive role as a result of its design, it was considered "a failure as a ship of war", and was assigned to the defense of the Armada base at Ferrol. Duque de Tetuán served in this unglamorous role, seeing no action, for the duration of its career.

Considered a third-rate ship by the close of the 19th century, Duque de Tetuán was decommissioned and struck from the official strength of the Armada by 1897. However, in 1898, the outbreak of the Spanish–American War led to its being recommissioned, to once more defend Ferrol against attack, the ship being fitted with controls for the electric mines that had been laid to protect the base.

After the end of the war, Duque de Tetuán was again decommissioned, and was sold for scrap in 1900.

== Bibliography ==
- Forbes, Archibald; Henty, George Alfred; Griffiths, Arthur (1896). Battles of the Nineteenth Century. Cassell.
- Greene, Jack; Massignani, Alessandro (2008). Ironclads At War: The Origin And Development Of The Armored Battleship. Da Capo Press. ISBN 978-0-7867-4298-1.
- Keltie, Sir John Scott, ed. (1887). The Statesman's Year-book: Statistical and Historical Annual of the States of the Civilised World for the Year 1887. Macmillan.
- Coello, Juan Luis; González, Agustín Ramón Rodríguez (2001). Buques de la Armada española: a través de la fotografía, (1849-1900) (in Spanish). Agualarga. ISBN 978-84-95088-37-6.
- Proceedings of the United States Naval Institute. Vol. XXIII. U.S. Naval Institute. 1897. p. 769.
- González, Agustín Ramón Rodríguez (1998). Operaciones de la Guerra de 1898: una revisión crítica. Actas Editorial. ISBN 978-84-87863-72-1.
