= José Polo de Bernabé =

Spanish Navy officer and diplomat

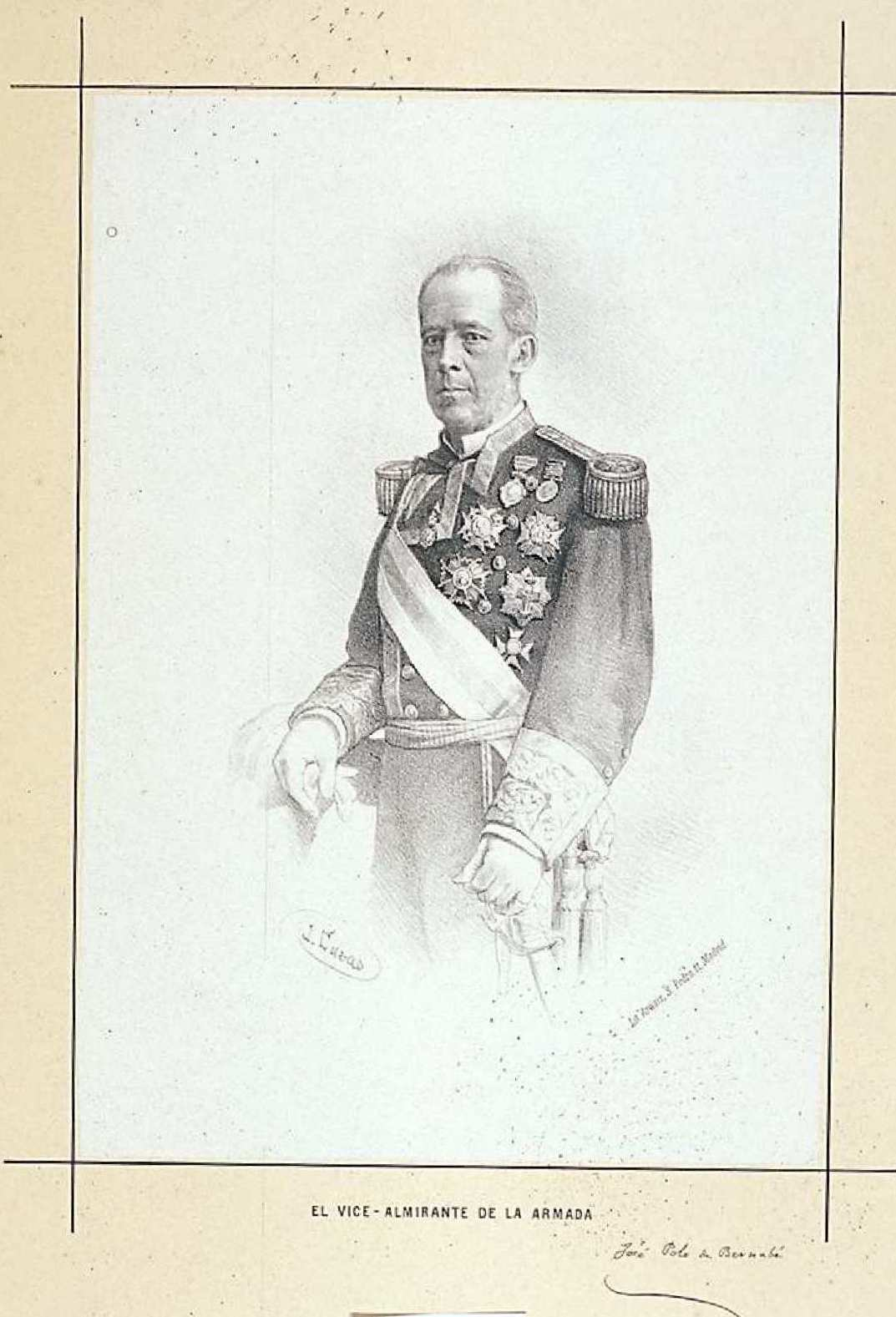
José Polo de Bernabé as Vice Admiral of the Navy, lithograph by José Cuevas, National Library of Spain.

José Polo de Bernabé (13 October 1821 – 17 February 1895) was a Spanish Navy officer and diplomat.

== Early life ==
He was the son of Peregrina María Mordella, a native of Cartagena, and Luis Polo de Bernabé y Mundina, a Captain of the Navy who was a native of Villarreal. His elder brother was the prominent businessman José Polo de Bernabé y Borrás, who was based in the Province of Castellón and served as Senator for the Balearic Islands.

His paternal grandparents were José Joaquín Polo de Bernabé y Fabra and Francisca de Paula Mundina y Marco.

== Career ==
He entered the Spanish Navy at a very young age in November 1838. He was successively promoted to second lieutenant in October 1844, capitán de fragata(frigate captain) in September 1853, capitán de navío (ship-of-the-line captain) in April 1860, brigadier in 1868, and contralmirante (counter admiral) in 1869, and he became vice-president of the Admiralty in July 1870. In 1857, he was in command of the corvette Villa de Bilbao and was later transferred to the screw frigate Nuestra Señora del Carmén, a command he took upon being promoted to capitán de navío (ship-of-the-line captain) in 1860. On 10 November 1870, the Regent of Spain, General Francisco Serrano, (Note: Upon the recommendation of the Minister of the Navy José María Beránger.) appointed him general commander of the South American Squadron, of which he took command on 27 August 1871 in Rio de Janeiro. He remained in command of the squadron until he was appointed Minister to the United States in 1872. By decree of 22 July 1874, he returned to active service in the Navy. Following the death of general commander of the Naval Forces operating in the Cantabrian Sea, Victoriano Sánchez Barcáiztegui, on 29 May 1875, he was appointed to replace him during the Third Carlist War. On 6 May 1876, he was appointed member of the Superior Advisory Board of the Navy, which he left on 2 February 1877 when he became Commander General of the Philippine Navy Station and Squadron. He remained in the Philippines until November 1879, when he was appointed General Commander of the Instruction Squadron.

Reportedly, he never wanted to accept the Navy portfolio, but in the Navy he held important positions, both in the Iberian Peninsula and overseas, commanding the Squadrons of the Río de la Plata, the Mediterranean and the North during the Carlist Wars. For his services, he was awarded several Grand Crosses, including the Grand Cross of the Order of Charles III, Grand Cross of Naval Merit and Grand Cross of the Order of Isabella the Catholic, and other decorations, both Spanish (including the Knight 1st Class of the Order of San Fernando and Benemérito de la Patria) and foreign (including Knight of the Order of Franz Joseph and Grand Cross of the Order of the Crown of Italy).

=== Diplomatic career ===
From February 1872 to July 1874, he served as Prime Minister Praxedes Mateo Sagasta's Minister Plenipotentiary of Spain in Washington, D.C. during the presidency of Ulysses S. Grant and under Secretary of State Hamilton Fish. While serving as Minister, his son Luis was attaché to the Embassy. While Minister in Washington, he helped ease some of the tensions between the United States and Spain, due to the Ten Years' War in Cuba (while Spain controlled Cuba), particularly around the Virginius Affair. (Note: Virginius was an American ship hired by Cuban insurrectionists to land men and munitions in Cuba to attack the Spanish regime there. It was captured by the Spanish, who wanted to try the men onboard (many of whom were American and British citizens) as pirates and execute them. The Spanish executed 53 men but stopped when the British government intervened.)

== Personal life ==
Polo de Bernabé was married to Carlota "Carolina" Pilón y Sterling. Together, they were the parents of:

- Luis Polo de Bernabé (1854–1929), who also became a diplomat; he married Ana María Méndez de Vigo, daughter of Ambassador Felipe Méndez de Vigo.

Polo de Bernabé died in Madrid on 17 February 1895.

Diplomatic posts
Preceded by Mauricio López Róberts	Spanish Minister to the United States; 1872–1874	Succeeded by Antonio Mantilla de los Ríos
