= Spanish ship Lealtad =

Various Spanish Navy ships

Three ships of the Spanish Navy have borne the name Lealtad, meaning Loyalty:

- Spanish frigate Lealtad (1825), a 50-gun sailing frigate launched in 1825 and wrecked in 1834.
- Spanish frigate Lealtad (1860), a Lealtad-class screw frigate in commission from 1861 to 1893 and sold for scrapping in 1897.
- Spanish launch Lealtad, an armed launch of 1881–1888.
