= Escombreras =

Islet in Spain

Coordinates: 37°33′34″N 0°58′09″W

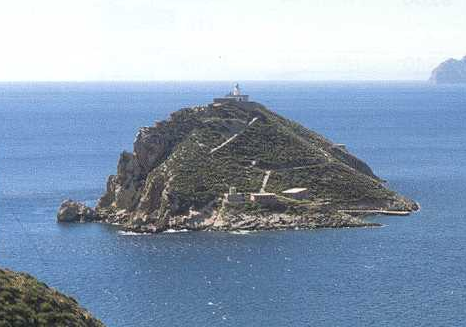
Escombreras islet. Currently -not shown in this picture- a breakwater hooks around the north side of the island

Escombreras is an islet within a natural park at the mouth of the port of Cartagena, Spain in the Region of Murcia.

A breakwater was built in 2011 for the expansion of the port has hooked around the north side of the island, but it does not connect to it.

The steep islet covers 4 hectares (9.9 acres). There is a lighthouse built in 1865 65 metres (213 ft) above sea level, an anchorage, but there is no permanent human habitation.

Archeological remains from the Greek and Roman eras have been found on the islet.
