= Sánchez Barcáiztegui =

Sánchez Barcáiztegui may refer to:

- Victoriano Sánchez Barcáiztegui (1826–1875), Spanish naval officer
- Spanish ship Sánchez Barcáiztegui, more than one Spanish Navy ship
