= José de Ezquerra y Guirior =

José de Ezquerra y Guírior (25 January 1756 – 13 July 1801) was a Spanish Navy officer. Descended from an old noble family, he was captain of the 112-gun Real Carlos when he was killed at the Second Battle of Algeciras during the French Revolutionary Wars. He was a Knight of Santiago. In Tudela he had a 'palacio cabo de armería' called the Casa de Ezquerra.

== Family ==
He was the son of Joaquín de Ezquerra y Larrea and Paula Ignacia Guírior y Otazu. José's father (also born in Tuedla) was on the town council, his father's brother was lieutenant of a frigate, and his father's father was mayor. Paula Ignacia was born in Aoiz and her mother was marquis of Guírior, deputy to the Courts of Navarre and elder of Villanueva de Lónguida. Via his mother he was descended from Manuel de Guírior, first marquis of Guírior, viceroy of New Granada and of Peru.

== Life ==
=== Ensign to lieutenant (1771–1784) ===
Born in Tudela, he first joined the navy as an ensign in the Cádiz Department company on 1 October 1769 . After passing his theory exam, he joined several ships for his initial training before being promoted to frigate ensign on 15 January 1771 and being assigned to the Atlante operating in the Atlantic. He then transferred to the Princesa for a trip to the Canary Islands, then to the Lucía operating in the Atlantic and the Mediterranean. Next he was aboard the frigate Santa Catalina, with whom he sailed to the West Indies after a stop at Cartagena de Indias.

On 1 November 1774 he was given his first command, the corvette Ventura, on coastal defence duties. On one trip with that ship he ran aground on 23 May 1775 at Maracaibo harbour entrance. He was court-martialled but acquitted of all charges and transferred to the frigate Industria and then to the Rosario, on which he returned to Cádiz and with which he remained until it was placed in reserve on 27 August 1776.

In the meantime, on 17 March 1776, he was promoted to ship-of-the-line ensign. Transferring to the Marine Infantry, he was promoted to frigate lieutenant by Royal Order of 17 July 1777. He joined the frigate Santa Catalina, then commanded by José de Varela y Ulloa, and set sail for Mar del Plata with the news that Spain had made peace with Portugal. On leaving Montevideo the ship headed for the Gulf of Guinea to retake possession of the islands of Fernando Poo and Annobón, making several hydrographic surveys there.

Leaving Cádiz on 15 April 1779, he was promoted to ship lieutenant on 14 May aboard the 100-gun Rayo, lieutenant general Miguel Gastón's flagship. He then joined Luis de Córdova y Córdova's fleet, which was operating alongside a French force under Louis Guillouet, count of Orvilliers. The Rayo saw action in the English Channel against a British force under admiral Charles Hardy, forcing the latter to retreat to their ports after losing the 74-gun HMS Ardent to the French.

The French and Spanish fleets then left the Channel to blockade Gibraltar, remaining there until 10 November 1781, when de Ezquerra y Guirior was put in command of the frigate Santa Bibiana, with which he sailed to La Habana then to Veracruz and embarked troops under brigadier general Félix de Tejada. On 18 October 1783 he married María del Bayo, lady of Laboa, with whom he had eight children, including Joaquín Ezquerra del Bayo.

=== Captain (1784–1800) ===
He then returned to Cádiz in lieutenant general José Solano y Bote's squadron. Upon arrival the ship was disarmed and made a service ship for the arsenal. He was made a frigate captain on 15 November 1784. He was made second-in-command of the Santa Escolásticain lieutenant general Juan de Lángara y Huarte's training squadron from 9 February to 5 December 1787. On 6 December he was put in command of the frigate Santa Teresa for coastal defence missions until 24 March 1788, when he took command of the frigate Santa Leocadia, sailing her to Trinidad de Barlovento and then to Cartagena de Indias. On returning to Europe, he arrived at Ferrol on 5 July 1789 and his ship was dry-docked for repairs.

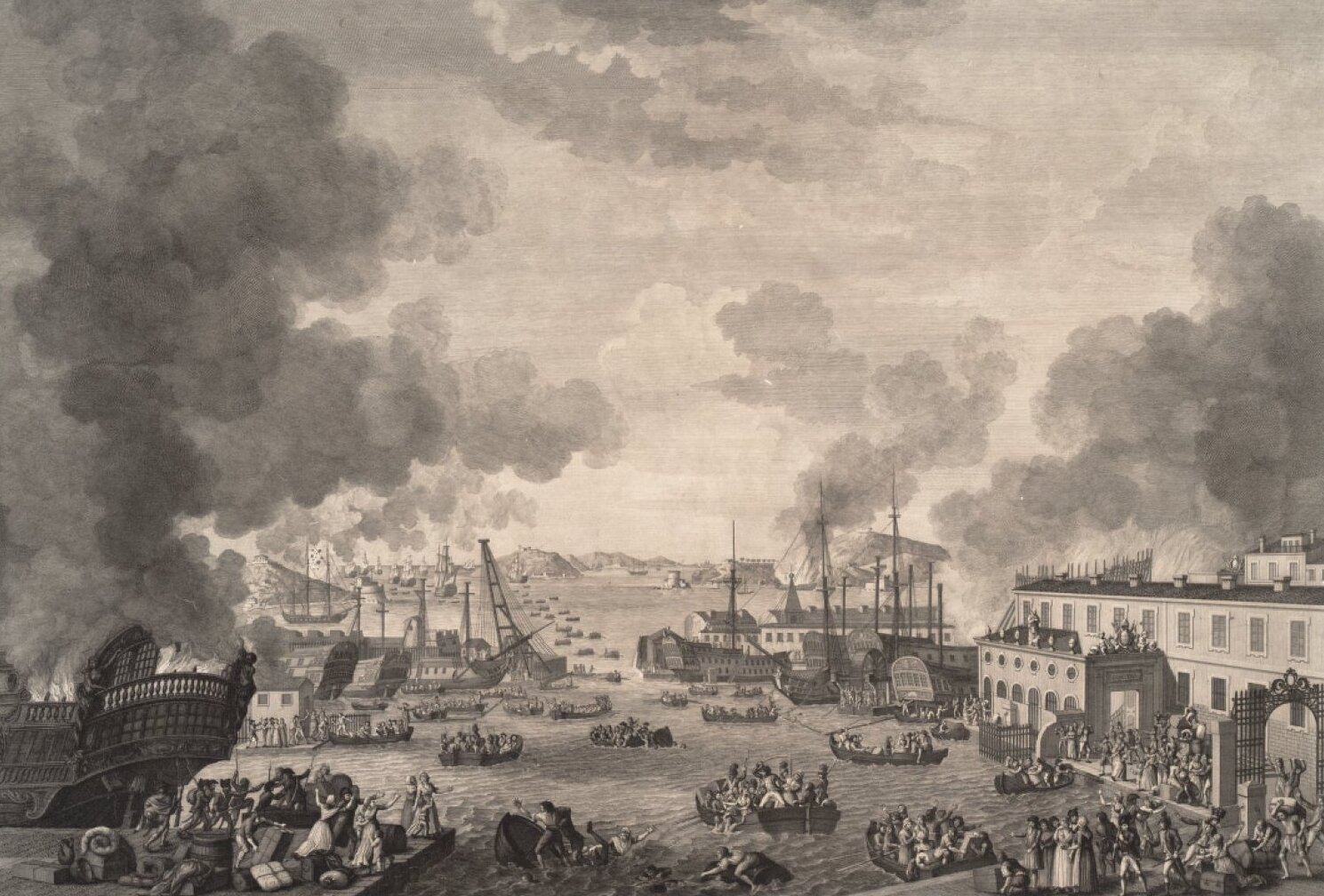
The allied force retreating from Toulon

On 12 July 1791 he took command of the frigate Santa Elena, taking her on a number of missions to St Vincent and La Roca to protect ships travelling to Spain from its empire. He rose to the rank of ship captain on 17 January 1792. In 1793, when war broke out with the new French First Republic, he took command of the 74-gun San Fermín under lieutenant general Lángara y Huarte, who joined up with the British admiral Samuel Hood to occupy the French port of Toulon. When the joint force evacuated Toulon, the San Fermín also took a number of French monarchists who had taken refuge in the city's arsenal to the Hyeres Islands. There the ship rejoined y Huarte's force and continued to Mahón then Cartagena. Also in 1793 he became a Knight of Santiago.

He was then moved to command the San Joaquín and sailed for Livorno to pick up the Duke of Parma, who was due to marry princess María Luisa. Once the marriage had occurred he took the couple from Spain to Tuscany before returning to Cartagena on 11 July 1795. He next moved to command the San Ildefonso, taking her into British waters on reconnaissance duties until the Treaty of Basel on 22 July that year.

Spain declared war on Britain in 1796 and in December the following year he was put in command of the San Fernando, flagship of Pedro Luis Obregón y Ceballos. In 1798 his ship was one of those which transported marshal Caijgal's division from La Coruña towards Santa Cruz de Tenerife, eluding the Royal Navy. Returning to Ferrol, he left the San Fernando after Royal Order of 20 August 1799 made him sub-inspector of arsenal supplies.

=== Final command (1800–1801) ===
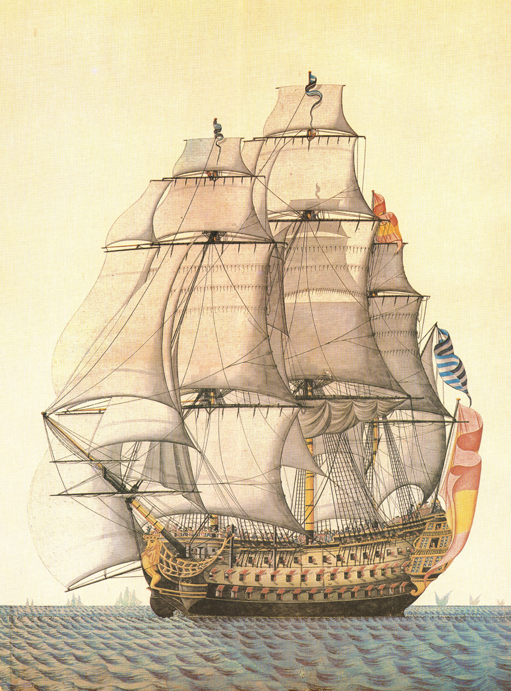
The Real Carlos

On 4 January 1800 he took command of the three-masted 112 gun Real Carlos, flagship of lieutenant general Juan Joaquín Moreno. In May the same year he and the rest of Moreno's squadron (made up of the ships of the line San Hermenegildo, Real Carlos, Argonauta and Monarca, the frigates Nuestra Señora de la Asunción, Nuestra Señora de la Paz, Nuestra Señora de las Mercedes and Santa Clara, the brigantines Palomo and Vivo and the sloop Alduides) defended the port of Ferrol from an attempted landing by 12,000 British troops under Lieutenant General James Pulteney on ships commanded by Vice Admiral John Borlase Warren.

At dawn on 26 August the British assault troops were attacked by an infantry column landed from several Spanish vessels and by 56 marines and 67 infantry of the Asturias Regiment landed from the Argonauta. On 20 April 1801 Moreno's ships sailed from Ferrol and on 25 April arrived at the port of Cádiz, where they anchored. On 13 June a French squadron under the command of counter-admiral Charles-Alexandre Léon Durand Linois, consisting of three ships of the line and a frigate, aided by smaller Spanish vessels, defeated six British ships of the line under James Saumarez in the Bay of Algeciras.

The French ships sailed into the small port of Algeciras after the battle, whilst the British ones took refuge in Gibraltar to prepare for revenge. Via his subordinate Pierre Dumanoir le Pelley, Linois to send reinforcements and supplies to enable him to repair at Cádiz. Admiral de Mazarredo ordered a force of five Spanish ships of the line, a Spanish frigate the French Saint Antoine under commodore Julien Le Ray and several smaller French ships to sail from Cádiz, under the command of lieutenant general Moreno. It arrived at the port of Algeciras the same afternoon, Moreno met Linois, and the two forces sailed for Cádiz on 12 July, pursued by Saumarez's force. The French admiral also wanted to take with him HMS Hannibal, a 74-gun British ship captured in the earlier battle and converted to French service, even though it was completely disarmed and was sailing with makeshift improvised masts after losing its real ones in the battle. It had to be towed behind the frigate Indienne and slowed down the whole group. Following new instructions from the Spanish naval high command, the two admirals transferred to the frigate Sabine and Moreno - preoccupied with reaching Cádiz as soon as possible - sent the Hannibal back to Algeciras.

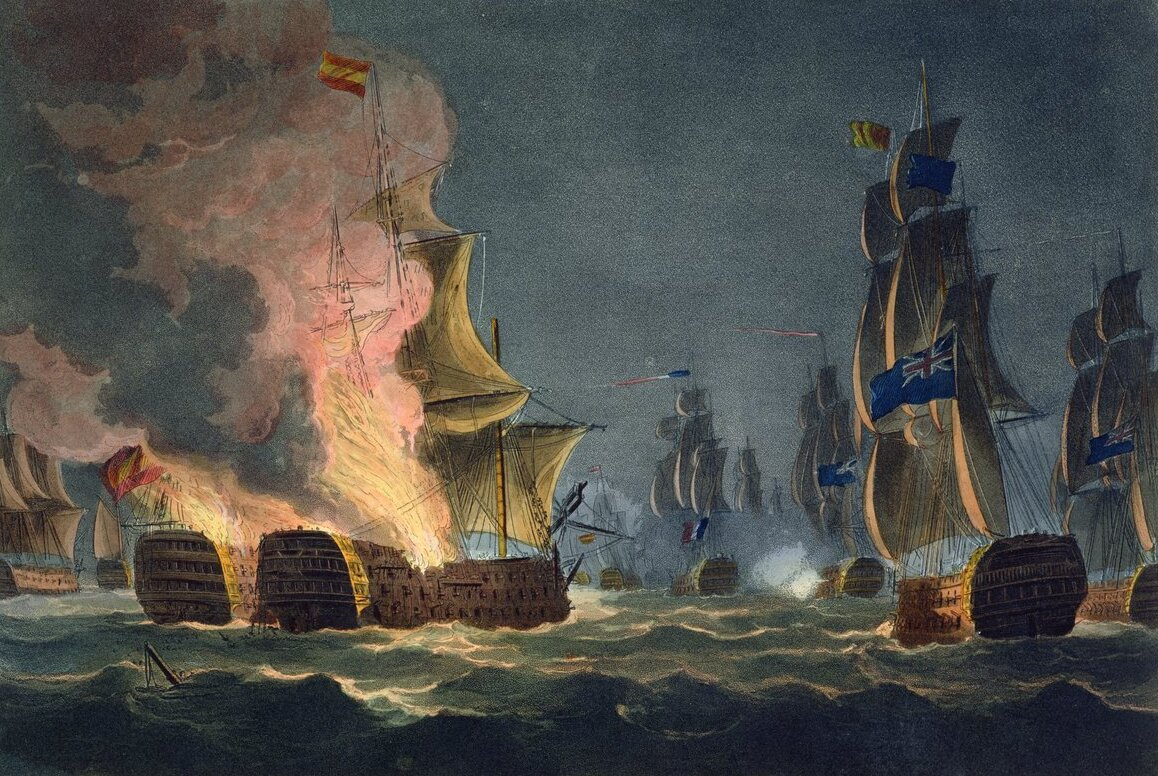
Real Carlos and San Hermenegildo just before exploding – a painting by Thomas Whitcombe

Unable to catch up with the enemy otherwise, Saumarez ordered his ships to break formation and pursue the enemy rear-guard ships, namely the Real Carlos (part of the first squadron with the French vessels Formidable and Indomptable), with San Hermenegildo under Manuel Antonio de Emparan y Orbe to her port and the Saint Antoine to her starboard. HMS Superb under captain Richard Goodwin Keats managed to catch up with the three rear-guard ships on the night of 12–13 July, attacking the Real Carlos in complete darkness from about 320 m away. The Spanish ship was badly damaged, losing a topmast and setting on fire. That fire was visible to both fleets and the San Hermenegildo took advantage of this to engage the nearest ship, contrary to Moreno's strict orders to identify a ship before engaging it.

However, that nearest ship was the Real Carlos, which immediately replied. Still unaware, the two ships exchanged broadside after broadside until the fire on the Real Carlos got out of control. She swerved and collided with the San Hermenegildo, which was unable to cut herself free and set on fire too. The two ships' crews tried to abandon ship in small boats, but the nearby British ships were unable to rescue any of them until after the explosion. The Real Carlos exploded and sank at 0:15 am, followed by the San Hermenegildo 45 minutes later. Only 36 sailors and two officers survived from the Real Carlos, compared to 262 from the San Hermenegildo, with 1,700 in total killed on the two ships, including both their commanders. Spain's Panteón de Marinos Ilustres has a plaque whose inscription translates as:

To the memory of Naval Captain Don José de Ezquerra y Guírior. Killed in the explosion of the Real Carlos under his command in the battle in the Straits of Gibraltar, 12 July 1801.»

== Bibliography ==
- Buale Borikó, Emiliano (1989). El laberinto guineano (in Spanish). Madrid: Iepala Editorial.
- Cárdenas Piera, Emilio de (1995). Caballeros de la Orden de Santiago: continuación de la obra de Vicente de Cárdenas y Vicent, del mismo título, que quedó interrumpida en el Tomo V (in Spanish). Madrid: Ediciones Hidalguía.
- Cervera Pery, José (2004). El Panteón de Marinos Ilustres, trayectoria histórica, reseña biográfica (in Spanish). Madrid: Ministerio de Defensa.
- Cervera y Jácome, Juan (1926). El Panteón de Marinos Ilustres (in Spanish). Madrid: Ministerio de Marina.
- Donolo, Luigi (2012). Il Mediterraneo nell'Età delle rivoluzioni 1789-1849 (in Italian). Pisa: Pisa University Press.
- Fernández Duro, Cesáreo (1902). Armada Española desde la unión de los reinos de Castilla y de Aragón. Tomo 8 (in Spanish). Madrid: Est. Tipográfico "Sucesores de Rivadeneyra".
- James, William (1902). The naval history of Great Britain, from the declaration of war by France in 1793, to the accession of George IV : A new ed., with additions and notes, bringing the work down to 1827 (1902) Vol. 1. London: MacMillan and Co.
- Madueño Galán, José María (2009–2013). "Ezquerra y Guírior, José Javier de". Diccionario biográfico español (in Spanish). Vol. XVIII. Madrid: Real Academia de la Historia. pp. 216–218. OCLC 729345746.
- Marichalar, Antonio (1944). "Los Ezquerras de Tudela". Príncipe de Viana (in Spanish). 5 (17): 441–442. ISSN 0032-8472.
- Núñez Iglesias, Indalecio; Fernández Núñez, Pedro (1977). El coloquio de Brión (in Spanish). Madrid: Museo Naval.
- Paula Pavía, Francisco de (1874). Galería Biográfica de los Generales de Marina Tomo 4 (in Spanish). Madrid: Imprenta F. García y D. Caravera.
- Turnstall, Brian (1990). Naval Warfare in the Age of Sail, the evolution of fighting tactics 1650-1815. London: Conway Maritime Press.
- Válgoma y Finestrat, Dalmiro de la, Barón de Válgoma (1944–1956). Real Compañía de Guardia Marinas y Colegio Naval. Catálogo de pruebas de Caballeros aspirantes (in Spanish). Madrid: Instituto Histórico de Marina.

== External links (in Spanish) ==
- "Spanish First Rate ship of the line 'Real Carlos' (1787)". threedecks.org.
- "La trágica pérdida del San Hermenegildo y el Real Carlos". Todo a Babor.
- Casa de José de Ezquerra en Tudela
