= Joaquín Ezquerra del Bayo (1793-1859) =

Joaquín Ezquerra del Bayo (11 September 1793 - 14 August 1859) was a Spanish writer, engineer and geologist and one of the founder members of the Real Academia de las Ciencias Exactas, Físicas y Naturales.

== Life ==
He was born at Ferrol to the ship's captain José Javier Ezquerra Guirior, a member of the Navarre nobility from Tudela who died when Joaquín was aged eight when the ship he was commanding exploded at the 1801 siege of Tarifa. Joaquín's mother was Ana María del Bayo from Zamora, lady of Lavoa. On his father's death Charles IV of Spain made Joaquín "knight-page to the king" and he studied for eight years with the Piarists in Zaragoza, gaining excellent grades and showing skill in mathematics, natural sciences and French.

As an Afrancesado, in 1810 he left for France with Joseph Bonaparte's staff, living there until 1822 and associating with the family of the former king's secretary. On his return he entered the Escuela de Ingenieros de Caminos y Canales on 19 June 1821 and was made assistant to the Cuerpo de Caminos y Canales, but Fernando VII closed the Escuela in 1823. He was exiled for a year, using it to study drawing and painting in the studio of Vicente López.

He began studying mineralogy and metallurgy, spending five years studying under Fausto de Elhúyar, Rafael Amar de la Torre and Felipe Bauzá from mid 1830 until 1834 in the Royal Academy of Mines in Freiberg and in the Austrohungarian Empire. He also produced a travel book in 1847 summarising his travels in Germany, which he illustrated himself and contains technological and scientific observations. In 1833 he was Spain's delegate to the congress of scholars in Breslau, presenting a paper on the origin of eruptive rocks.

He was later inspector general of the Cuerpo de Ingenieros de Minas and professor of mining and applied mechanics at the Cuerpo's Escuela Especial, a chair he held until 1844. After this year he was continuously commissioned in preparing mining and geognostic plans and studies - he wrote Spain's first manual on that topic. He was also a member of various scientific societies (the Societé Geologique de France, the Geological Society of London, the Economic Societies of the Grand Duchy of Baden, Madrid and Tudela) and the author of important works, such as industrial studies and an 1847 translation of Charles Lyell's Elements of Geology, with additions on Spanish geology. He published numerous works, reports and books on geology in several languages and was also one of the coordinators and directors of the commission to create a geological map of Spain, director of a glass factory in Aranjuez (1826-1827), and assistant professor to Antonio Gutiérrez in the physics chair at the Conservatory of Arts (now the School of Industrial Engineers), a chair he held between 1839 and 1840.

In 1837 he became a full member of the Real Academia de Ciencias Naturales de Madrid. Already a renowned geologist, in 1851 he was commissioned to visit mines in north European countries such as Sweden, Norway and Belgium, later writing another travel book on the trip. By order of the Dirección General de Minas, he edited the maps of the national mines of Riotinto (1828) and later was given royal orders to design water conduits to Madrid from the rivers Lozoya and Guadalix (1829).

He was also one of the founder members of the Real Academia de las Ciencias Exactas, Físicas y Naturales in 1847 and the following year Queen Isabel II of Spain granted him the encomienda of Charles III and made him a 'Gentilhombre de Cámara' (privy counsellor) with exercise.

== Works ==
=== Major scientific works ===
- Minas de carbón de piedra de Asturias. 1831. Junto con Bauza, Amar de la Torre y García.

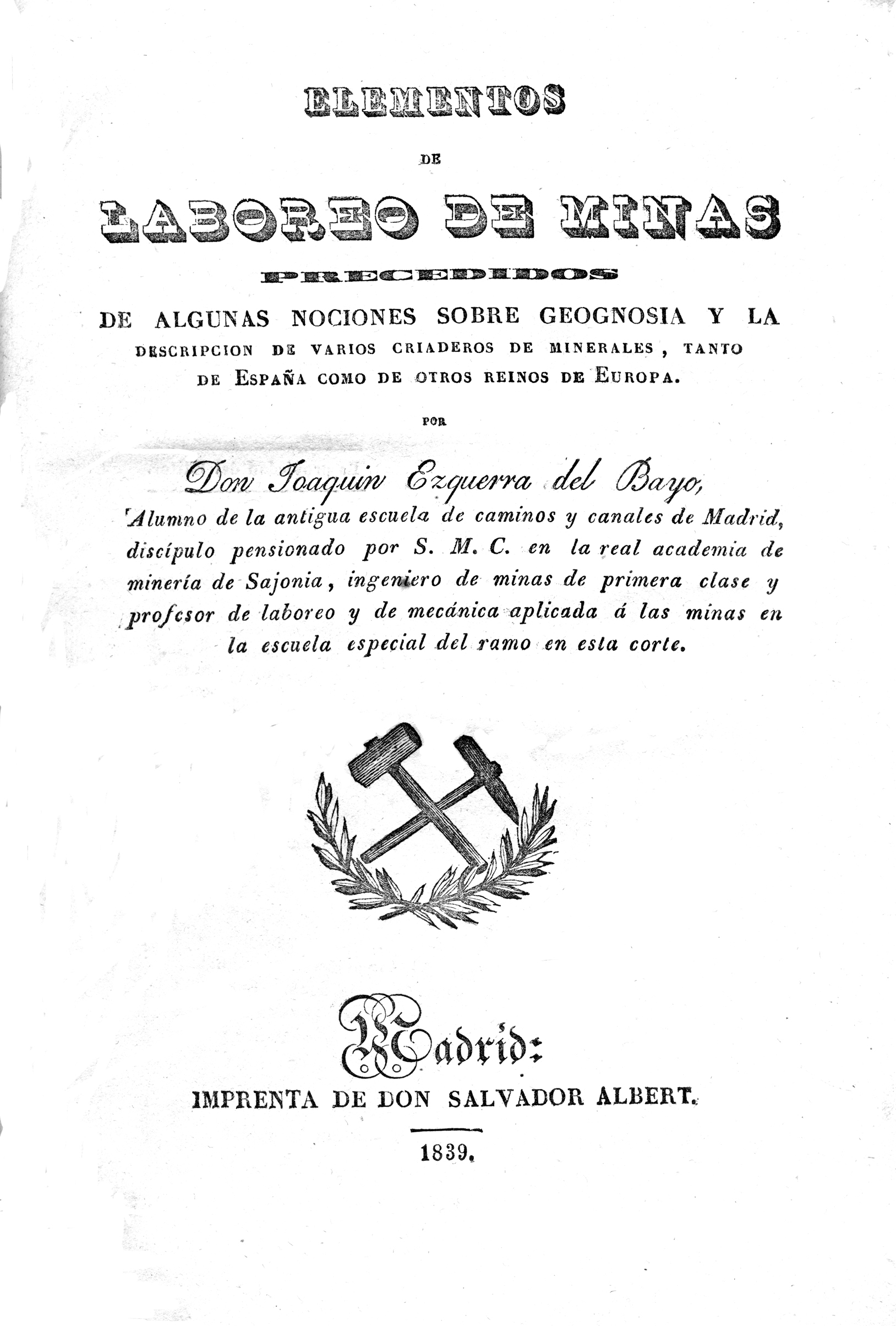
Frontispiece of the first edition of Elementos de laboreo de minas by Ezquerra del Bayo

- Elementos de laboreo de minas precedidos de algunas nociones sobre geognosia y la descripción de varios criaderos minerales, tanto de España como de otros reinos de Europa. (Note: His most important work, it was published in two editions in Madrid in 1839 and 1851. It is the first modern work on mining technology by a Spanish author. Both editions included an atlas with 13 and 16 plates respectively. The plates in the second volume include connecting arch between the mines of San Nicolás and of San Francisco in the Almadén mine, an important engineering marvel of the age. In 1847 an edition copying the first edition was issued without the author's knowledge or consent, printed at the Imprenta de Los Tribunales, Santiago de Chile, using official Chilean spelling of the period as proposed by Juan García del Río and Andrés Bello and including redrawn and re-engraved plates almost identical to the originals.)
- Datos y observaciones sobre la industria minera, con una descripción característica de los minerales útiles, Madrid: Antonio Yenes, 1844. (Note: Describes various mines in Saxony and in the Almagrera Range in Almería, especially those on the Jaroso vein.)
- Sobre el estado actual y marcha progressiva de las minas del Barranco Jaroso en Sierra-Almagrera. Imprenta de A. Yenes, Madrid, 1850.
- Ensayo de una descripción general de la estructura geológica del terreno de España en la Península [s.l.] : [s.n.], 1850-1857.
- Memorias sobre las minas nacionales de Rio-Tinto, Madrid: Imprenta de la viuda de Don Antonio Yenes, 1852. (Note: Including a large plate of the mining site.)

=== Other scientific works ===
Published as articles in the Boletín Oficial de Minas, the Anales de Minas, the Revista Minera and other journals.

==== In Spanish ====
- Indicaciones geognósticas sobre las formaciones terciarias del Centro de España
- Apuntes geognósticos y mineros sobre una parte del Mediodía de España
- Observaciones geognósticas y mineras sobre la sierra del Moncayo
- Algo sobre los huesos fósiles de las inmediaciones de Madrid
- Descripción de la sierra Almagrera y su riqueza actual (1841)
- Sobre el estado actual, y marcha progresiva de las minas del barranco Jaroso de Sierra Almagrera
- Datos sobre la estadística minera de España en 1839
- Indicaciones geognósticas sobre las formaciones terciarias del Centro de España. Sobre los antiguos diques de la cuenca terciaria del Duero
- Resumen estadístico razonado de la riqueza producida por la industrua minera en España durante el año 1814
- Geología. Nieves perpetuas y bloques erráticos
- Descripción geognóstica y minera de los criaderos de Santa Cruz de Mudela
- Descripción geognóstica y minera de la provincia de Zamora
- Descripción geognóstica y minera de la provincia de Palencia
- Sobre el carbón de piedra de Castilla la Vieja
- Sobre la producción de los metales preciosos
- Memoria sobre las minas nacionales de Riotinto
- Ensayo de una descripción general de la estructura geológica del terreno de España en la Península
- Sobre los escoriales de fundiciones antiguas en España
- Observaciones sobre el estado actual y mejoras que admiten las labores de beneficio de las minas de Riotinto
- Modernos descubrimientos en el interior de África
- Sobre la fosforita de Logrosán
- Sobre la necesidad de trazar la línea meridiana en varios puntos del territorio de la Península

==== In German ====
- Die Bergwerke von Hiendelaencina in der provinz de Guadalajara
- Geonostiche übersichtskarte von Spanien

=== Travel writings ===
- Viage científico y pintoresco a los diferentes estados de Alemania t. 1, Que comprende el Salzburgo, el Tirol y parte del gran Ducado de Baden, Madrid: Viuda de Antonio Yenes, 1847. (Note: Only one volume was published, describing the mines, salt mines and mineralogical collections in Germany, Tyrol and part of the Grand Duchy of Baden.)
- Viaje por el Norte de Europa hasta Suecia y Noruega. Madrid, 1857.

=== Literary and political works ===
- Pasatiempos literarios. Madrid, 1856. Lendas.
- Parangón entre el esclavo y el proletario libre en el siglo XIX. Madrid, 1856.

=== Autobiography ===
- Recuerdos de un caballero paje de Carlos IV
