= Victoriano Sánchez =

Victoriano Sánchez may refer to

- Victoriano Sánchez Arminio (1942–2023), Spanish football referee
- Victoriano Sánchez Barcáiztegui (1826–1875), Spanish Navy officer
