= Spanish ship Sánchez Barcáiztegui =

Various Spanish Navy ships

Two ships of the Spanish Navy have borne the name Sánchez Barcáiztegui, after Capitán de navío de primera clase (Ship-of-the-Line Captain) First Class Victoriano Sánchez Barcáiztegui (1826–1875), a Spanish Navy hero of the Chincha Islands War and the Third Carlist War (1872–1876):

- Sánchez Barcáiztegui, a Jorge Juan-class screw sloop commissioned in 1877 and sunk in a collision in 1895.
- Sánchez Barcáiztegui, a Churruca-class destroyer in commission from 1928 to 1964.
