= Panteón de Marinos Ilustres =

Building in Cádiz Province, Spain

Pantheon of Illustrious Sailors
- Panteón de Marinos Ilustres
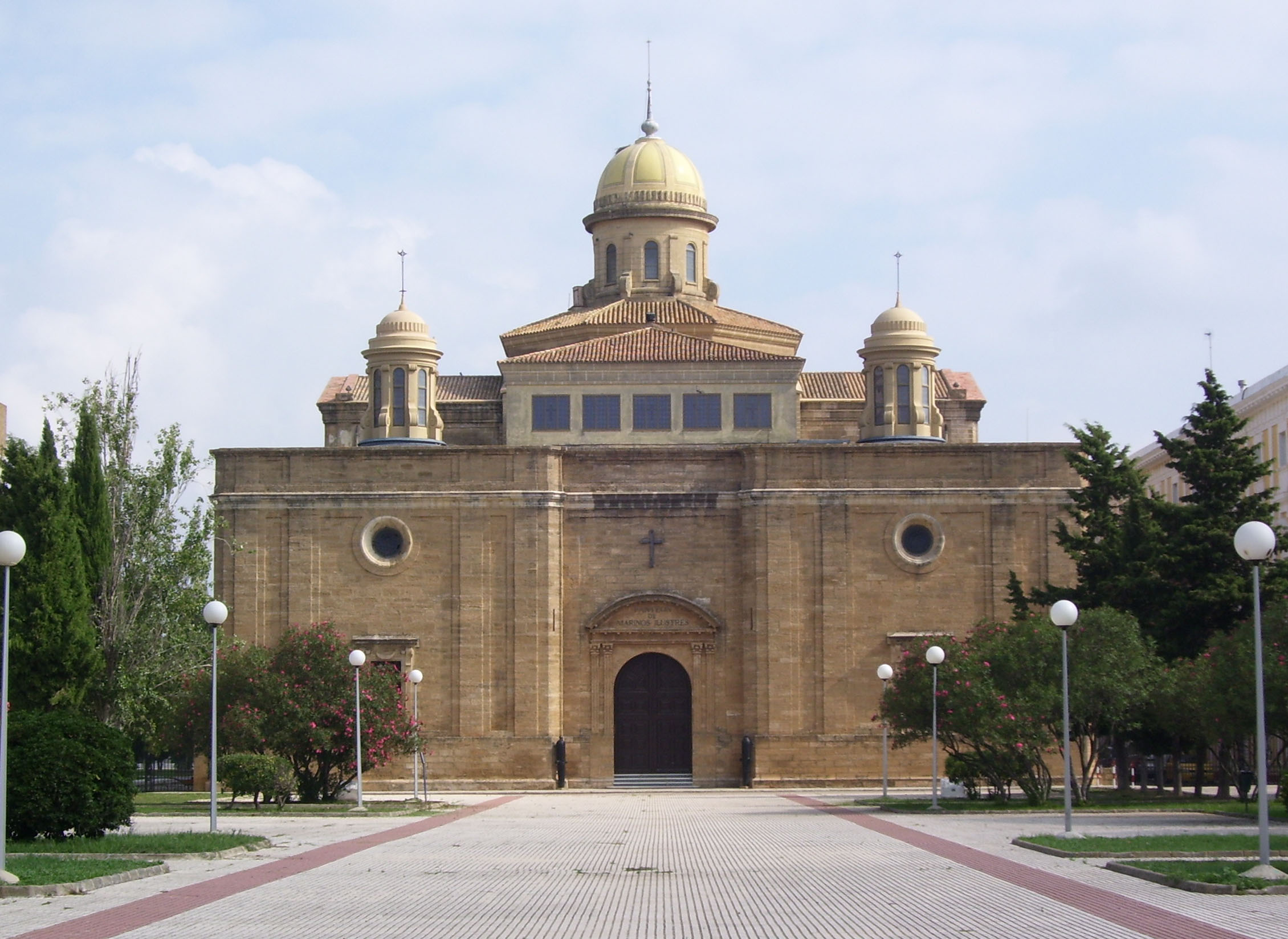
- Rear facade of building. Note the Romanesque (semi-circular) doorway and the 18th century cupolas for light wells, the main one being over the opening in the main dome. A false architrave over the arch of the door bears the name of the monument in raised silver letters.
- Interactive map of Pantheon of Illustrious Sailors
- Location: Military reservation of San Carlos adjacent to the north of San Fernando, Cádiz, whether on the lands of the civilian community is a moot point.
- Coordinates: 36°28′47″N 6°11′37″W
- Designer: Initially Francisco Sabatini
- Type: Initially intended as a parish church, it was abandoned 1805, restarted 1845 as the chapel of the new Spanish Naval Academy, converted to a mausoleum starting 1850.
- Material: Diverse materials: Wood, stone, metal, glass, concrete, and more
- Length: 88.57 metres (290.6 ft)
- Width: 37.5 metres (123 ft)
- Beginning date: 1786
- Completion date: 1854
- Dedicated to: Front inscription in Latin: OMNES.ISTI; IN.GENERATIONIBUS; GENTIS.SUAE; GLORIAM.ADEPTI.SUNT; ET.IN.DIEBUS.SUI; HABENTUR; IN.LAUDIBUS; Spanish translation: "Todos estos alcanzaron gloria en las edades de su nacion, y en sus dias son celebrados." English translation: "All these were honoured in their generations, and were the glory of their times."
- Website: "Panteón de Marinos Ilustres".

The Pantheon of Illustrious Sailors (Spanish: Panteón de Marinos Ilustres) is a mausoleum and memorial to all the mariners of the Spanish Navy, especially prominent ones, and to the Spanish Navy and all its ships, battles and explorations in general, located in Cádiz, Spain. The term Pantheon is a concession to the generally prevalent and popular style of neoclassical architecture, which is supposed to have begun explicitly in the 18th century, but was in use long before then in the Renaissance, a "rebirth" of classical civilization, especially in decorative ornamentation.

The application of "Pantheon" in this case is entirely superficial. The building is composed of two layers: a Catholic church to which a cemetery has been added by enclosure and roofing. The church projects above the roof of the building, while the cemetery appears as projections off the nave. The philosophic term Pantheon comes from a different, polytheistic religion. Etymologically, it refers to a panoply of "all the gods." Christianity, however, is considered a monotheistic religion, despite the Trinitarian subdivision of divinity into three persons. As each person is fully God, and is not lessened by division, the Trinity is described as a mystery.

The application of the term to the building, however, is entirely architectural. The Spanish architects who assigned the term believed they were creating a type of building, which, in the 18th and 19th centuries, was termed a Pantheon, because of the central dome. The earliest extant instance of a large domed structure is the Pantheon of Rome. Originally a pagan temple, it utilized the principle of the arch to support a heaven-like surface over a public chamber, the rotunda. Geometrically a dome is an arch rotated about a central axis, so whatever load-bearing advantage an arch has is multiplied over the dome. The Roman Pantheon survived because it was quickly converted into a Christian church, like many other pagan public buildings. Domes became a standard feature of state and religious buildings thereafter. Their sudden labelling as Pantheons in the 18th century is no doubt a neoclassicism, and there are others, such as a few frontal columns. The architecture, however, is primarily church architecture, none of which dates to classical times.

== Military community of San Carlos ==
The Spanish naval pantheon is located in Poblado Naval de San Carlos, historically the Población Militar de San Carlos, in the Province of Cádiz, Andalusia, Spain. The "population" part of the name can be any community in English. Here it means district, whether naval or military, which would be covered by the general English term, "base." The base is continuous with the city of San Fernando, on the north side of it, except for the security barriers delimiting the base. The post office, the telephone company, and the "population" consider the base as part of the city. However, it never was in any municipal sense. The Población was there first, and was named San Carlos. It was treated as a town. San Fernando grew to the south of it, on land not on the base. They were both on an island, a slight elevation in the wetlands, the Isla de León, on the Bay of Cádiz. The land and structures of the base were acquired by, and are administered by, the national government, today the Ministry of Defence. For example, in the military legal system, the base is the headquarters of Juzgado Togado Militar Territorial Nº 22, "Territorial Military Court District Number 22," comprising Cadiz, with an address of Poblado Naval de San Carlos San Fernando (Cádiz).

Like any base of any country, the units at the base, their function in the military, the facilities available, and the relationships to the civilian community, change frequently as the military is brought up to date. Whether the base is the Población Militar de San Carlos, or the Poblado Naval de San Carlos, or just plain San Carlos, and whether it is on land belonging to San Fernando, or the Defense Department, are ongoing controversies not likely to be settled soon. These changes all affected the architecture and accessibility of the Pantheon one way or another.

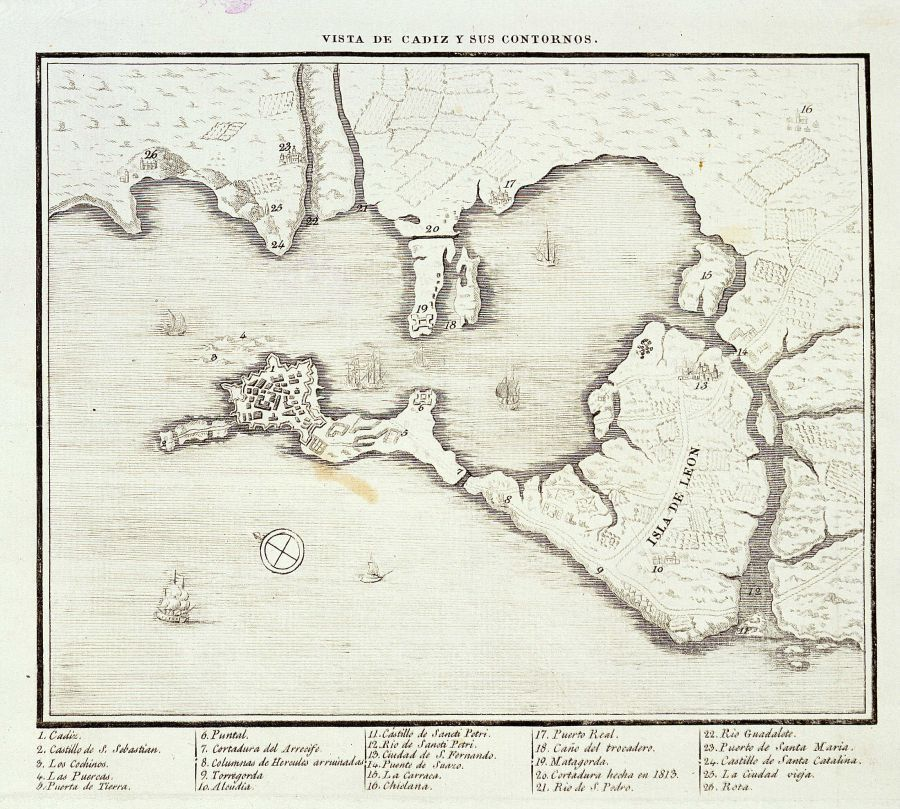
Vicinity of Cadiz, 1813

The reservation was created from crown lands in the late 18th century by the last absolute monarch of the Spanish Empire at its peak, Carlos III, who had other dominions than Spain. He donated the land for a base he considered an absolute necessity for the defense of Cadiz and of Spain, and then died. Without the base, Cadiz, placed on a long spit of land enclosing the Bay of Cadiz, would be easily surrounded and cut off. The base was part of a general plan of walls and fortifications in and around Cadiz. Carlos III had already chosen as their patron saint, Charles Borromeo, the counter-reformation saint, who did his best to reform the church and lure the Protestants back into it, even sending a mission to Switzerland, origin point of the Swiss reform, to invite the Protestants there to return to the Catholic Church. For his successes in partially restoring the church, Charles Borromeo was recognized as San Carlos. The successor of Carlos III on the latter's death issued an order that the incomplete works were to be named San Carlos in honor of Carlos III. The latter, of course, was no saint himself. San Fernando was not recognized as a town until the early 19th century.

The judgement of Carlos III turned out to be perspicacious and sound as, a generation after his death, 12,000 Spanish with some English and Portuguese held Cadiz against a French force of 70,000 under Napoleon in the Siege of Cádiz. All the rest of the country had fallen. When the French were gone, the savants who had congregated at Cadiz suggested a Constitution for a limited monarchy, but it was rejected by the monarch. San Carlos, however, entered a new ascendance in the structure of the military. It became the seat of the Spanish Naval Academy and the headquarters of the Spanish marines, with the Pantheon in a new role as chapel. In 1943 the Naval Academy moved to Pontevedra. The role of San Carlos after 1943 seemed to decline. San Fernando has been lobbying to take over its lands for commercial development, a goose laying a golden egg for some interests, as former bases are in many countries, especially the United States.

The issue came to a head in 2018, when all the old wisdom of Carlos III was reaffirmed. The Ministry of Defence (Ministerio de Defensa) firmly reasserted its claim over the previous land of the base, and more. In April of that year the Council of Ministers (Consejo de Ministros) declared the Población Militar de San Carlos, using those words, as a "Zone of Interest for National Defense" (Zona de Interés para la Defensa Nacional). On 12 June the Royal Decree (Real Decreto) was published in the Official State Gazette (Boletin Oficial del Estado, BOE). Previously 208 hectares (510 acres) were considered in the poblacion; now, somewhat more were to be included in the zone. The naval base to the north was brought in, and any nearby air space. The decree was more specific, giving coordinates of the zone and listing military rights over it. No action could be taken, or any regulation or statute passed, no transfer of property, or any new use, could be originated without express permission of the Ministry of Defense. National Defense must take priority.

== Architecture of the building ==
Unlike many prominent buildings, this one was not built in a single style for a single purpose; it evolved during the more than two hundred years of its existence. The various terms that have been used to describe it are not always apt, especially when they are translated into English.

=== Structural elements ===
The main structural elements used in the Illustrious Sailor's Pantheon are the arch, the vault, and the dome, all of which were in use in classical times, but generally not to the degree of elaboration shown in the great cathedrals and capitols of the Renaissance and after. The classical uses were, in turn, derived from the elaboration of a single, simple device: the wedge. Wedges were among the first tools devised by mankind, such as cutters, scrapers, and especially axes.

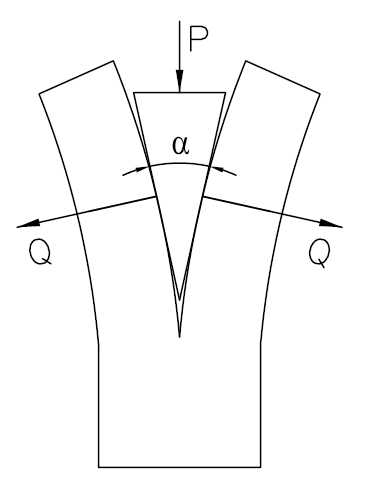
Axe-blade wedging wood apart

The wedge interposes the compression-resistant properties of its solid-state structure to change the direction and strength of a vector force transmitted by it. In the figure, the axeman imparts a momentum to the blade which, impacting the wood, generates a force acting at P along the length of the blade. The force does not leave in that direction because there is no bearing surface there. Instead, the force departs at right angles to the bearing surfaces at Q, forcing the wood apart and imparting momentum to any chips that fly off.

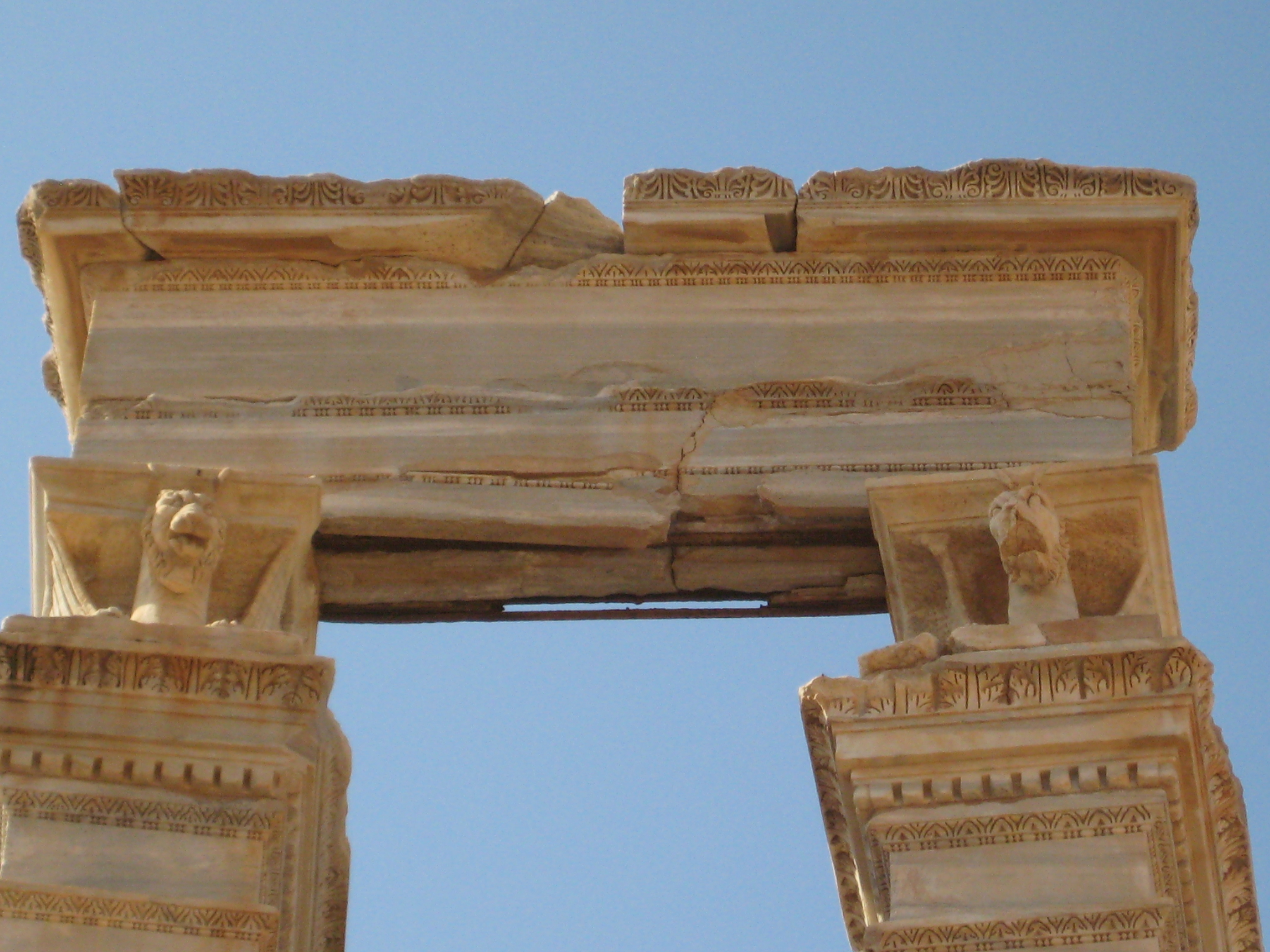
2nd century AD Roman lintel. Note the crack starting in the bottom of it

The angle of intersection of the bearing surfaces is subtended by an arc at a. Suppose the wood is removed and a number of axes are placed face-to-face, and that P is a static gravitational load. The arc is extended to an arch, while Q is diverted along the arch, leaving a force-free space below it. The forces at Q, however, must ultimately be countered or the arch will fly apart and collapse. If they are countered, the forces act to compress the wedges. The compressional strength of stone is very high. The alternative structure to an arch, the lintel, or beam across the top of the opening, as in the many prehistoric henges, must support the load in a different way. Every horizontal beam must sag under a load. When it does, the length must extend, subjecting the lintel to tensile forces. As the tensile strength of stone is much lower, the lintel under heavy loads typically breaks and collapses. Many arches survive from antiquity, but few lintels are still in place.

=== Composition ===
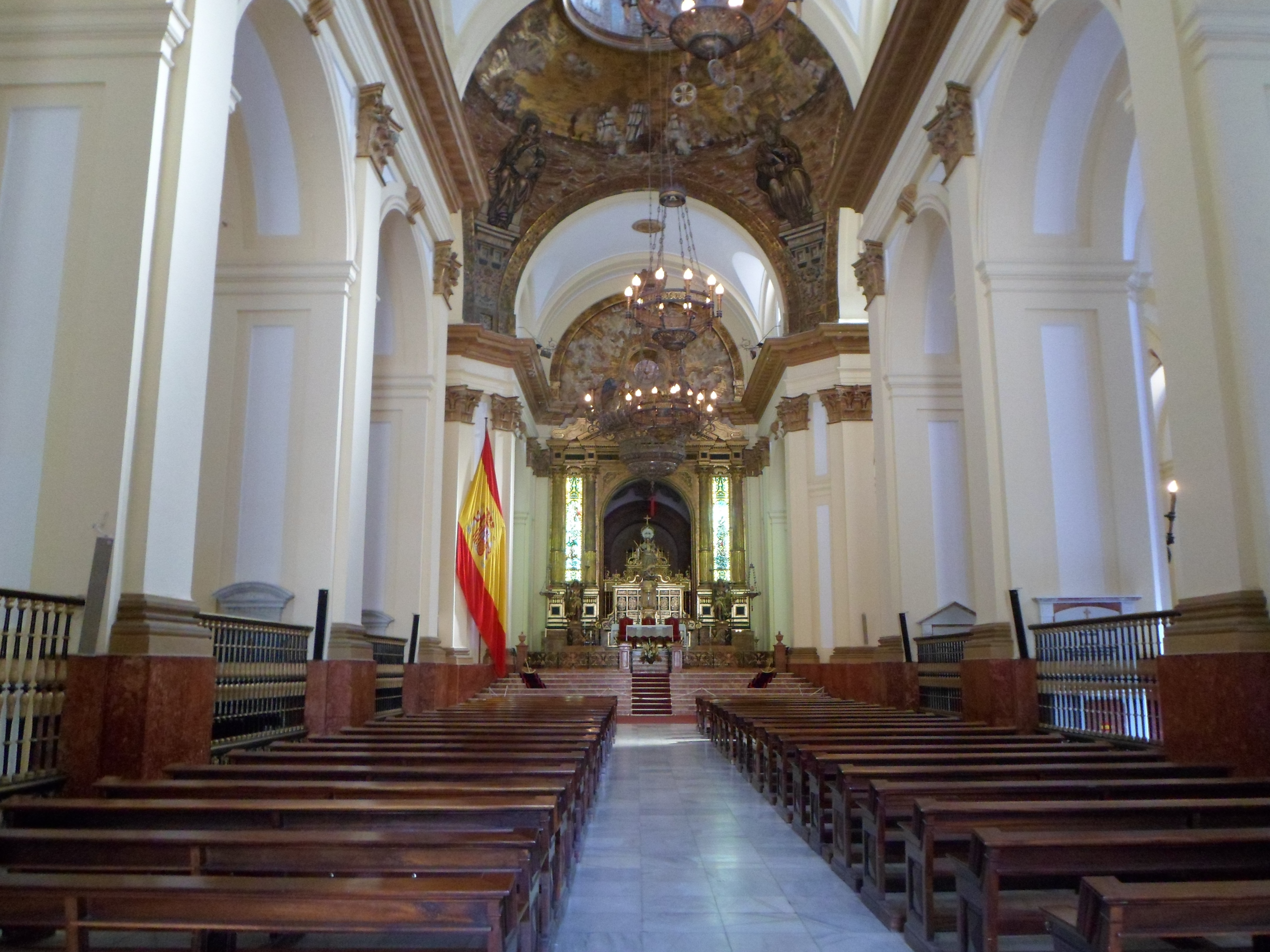
View from the foot of the architectural cross, from just inside the main entrance looking along the length of the cross. Directly before the viewer is the nave. It is a barrel vault, but the sides of the vault are arches supporting its roof. The cleared spaces beneath the arches lead to the aisles on either side, which contain memorials. Some view the three aisles as three naves. In the picture, the flag marks the end of the nave. Beyond it is the rotunda, which is empty. Above it is the embellished dome with an oculus, or opening like an eye in the center. In contrast to Roman oculi, this one is covered by a windowed cupola. Past the rotunda is the chancel, another barrel vault under which the bema is located. On its raised dais all ceremonies were conducted. At the back of the chancel is an apse at the uppermost part of the cross. The two arms or transept are not visible in this picture. They are used for memorial space.

The inner and earliest Pantheon is a classic example of church architecture of the Renaissance, a time when the cathedral structure reached its floruit. Small churches continued with the typical form evolved from a Roman house: a nave, or hall for the congregation with rows of seats; an apse, or special area facing the nave for the choir, the sacraments, statues or other images, and a stained glass window if one could be afforded, and the bema, a preaching pulpit inserted between in a lofty position appropriate to the power and authority of the church, believed to derive from the power and authority of God himself. Large churches, on which large amounts of cash could be expended, either private or public, took a more grandiose form along cathedral lines. The Pantheon is of the grandiose, expensive type, rather than the country-church, thrifty type. Home churching remained outside the pale in Spain. In Switzerland the great churches had been abandoned and stood vacant as monuments to vanity and corruption while the people worshipped in humble homes. This latter philosophy was never allowed to get started in Catholic Spain. The Inquisition stood in the way.

For Carlos III, the initiator of the project, there was never any choice. He needed a grandiose church of the old style to reaffirm the power and authority of the empire of which he alone was the absolute monarch. The grandeur of the church would be the glory of Spain. Typically of the absolute monarchs on the very doorstep of the Age of Revolution he had little thought for the cash he would have to outlay to obtain the outward form of the glory, to be the divine luminary on Earth shining benevolently over all mankind, if not as the son of God himself (as the ancient absolute monarchs had claimed) then at least as the sun of the Son. Reality would soon bring them all up short, as it had already done in Britain, and was about to do in the American colonies of Britain and in France.

After the death of Carlos III, Carlos IV (considered inept if not mentally deficient) was faced with a choice, a form of "guns or butter." The country needed to rearm for the conflicts the military advisors knew were coming. They had no money for expensive symbols of a glory now in question. Work on the cathedral was scaled down, then it was abandoned. San Carlos became not a town in need of a place to worship but a base in need of fortification. The basic form of the cathedral was in place. If it had been completed along traditional lines the exterior would have shown vaults and arches with perhaps flying buttresses and a great dome in the center. That external form was never to be.

By the time work on the building was resumed in the mid-19th century, it had different purposes and the architects had a different plan in mind. It was not a community cathedral now, but the chapel of the Spanish Naval Academy. Like naval academy buildings elsewhere it had a maritime monumental aspect. It would celebrate the history of the Spanish Navy and its mariners. The midshipmen would worship steeped in that history, as is appropriate for its students. The architects were guided more by the design of the first Mausoleum, a building celebratory of the transition to divinity and eternity.

The structure thus became one building within another. The inside walls form a splendid cathedral with arches, vaults, and domes (a main and some subsidiary), embellished with frescoes and larded with Baroque ornamentation. The monuments to the illustrious dead are tucked into every spare corner and corridor. Tons of gold and silver hang from the ceiling or rise from the floor as though in some expensive cave. The exterior building, in contrast, is a rectanguloid block with stark walls. There is no sign of any arch, vault, or dome. Even the superstructure on the roof over the domes is blocklike. At least the Pantheon of Rome gives the visitor an external dome to view, a hint of the dome to be seen within. The various domed capitol buildings of the world offer as much of a show on the outside as they do on the inside. In the Pantheon of Illustrious Mariners, the main show is interior. The exterior exists only to support it. All the buttressing required is thus hidden between the walls or in the overhead. To the outside the exterior walls present a few circular, empty-looking windows, like the dead eyes of a skull. The front portico with neo-classical columns and a pediment seems similarly empty and detached. The main use of the structure today is as a tourist attraction. It celebrates an empire that was but is no more.

== Ornamentation ==
In addition to the architectural features, which pertain to the structure of the building, the monument contains numerous purely ornamental features, some decorative elaboration of the walls and arches, others fixed, semi-fixed or portable additions. These latter include works of art of great aesthetic or cultural value, many of great monetary value. Most have some symbolic meaning with regards to the theme of the monument, which is basically, like most Christian religious monuments, "the church triumphant." The fact that the illustrious mariners earned their triumph by self-sacrificing words and deeds saves the monument from any such shallow and anti-Christian conclusion that only the rich go to heaven. Rather, character overcomes status, wealth, and power. The gravestones, which are more individualized, are considered in a subsequent section.

== Brief history of the building ==
San Fernando Island, as it now is called, is an island in the wetlands between the Bay of Cadiz and the Atlantic Ocean. It conveys the highway out to Cadiz, but much of it is of sufficient elevation to sustain buildable land, which today it totally built over. The rest is marsh, channels, and fine beaches. This wetlands site was always occupied, although marginally, by some persons of the same culture that occupied Cadiz. That was Phoenician at first, Roman next, Vandal-Roman next, Moorish-Vandal next, and finally in 1492, the year Columbus sailed to America, Spanish, as Ferdinand and Isabella took Andalusia from the Moors and finally expelled them, along with the Jews, from Spain. Columbus is believed by some to have fought before Granada, the last Moorish stronghold.

== Mariners honored ==
Numerous distinguished Spanish mariners are interred here or have monuments honouring them. The government policy was only to place officers in the monument, but in some cases enlisted men were included anonymously in groups of remains known to have included the captain, and in at least one case the crown intervened to memorialize under his own name a seaman who had died for his country of wounds inflicted during an intense sea battle (see below). In the mausoleum part of the monument, there is something like a tomb of the unknown sailor, a pool commemorating all those buried at sea, and a dedication to all mariners everywhere regardless of rank or educational status who served in the Spanish Navy.

Mariners called out by name include:

Mariners celebrated by the monument
Death	Given name	Surnames	Illustrious actions	English Wikipedia link
1872	José	Fernández Acevedo	First Mate of the ship, Julián Ordóñez, he happened to be in Fort San Felipe (Cavite) when the 1872 Cavite mutiny began and was massacred when the fort was taken by surprise	José Fernández Acevedo
1805	Francisco	Alcedo y Bustamante	Professional naval officer from Cantabria, with an extensive background in colonial voyages and training of midshipmen, he was killed on the deck of his last command, the ship of the line Montañés, in the Battle of Trafalgar	Francisco Alcedo y Bustamante
1898	José	Alvariño Gabeiras	Seaman First Class aboard the destroyer Pluto in the Battle of Santiago de Cuba. The commander and remnant of the crew having abandoned the devastated and sinking vessel, badly wounded, he signaled them and jumped. Pulled from the sea and hidden in a cave he was taken into custody by the Americans but died. After the war his remains were mistaken for those of a ship captain but correctly identified by an officer of the Pluto. He was memorialized in the monument at the request of the monarch for his bravery in dying for his country.	José Alvariño Gabeiras
1866	Francisco	Armero y Fernández de Peñaranda	Professional naval officer, serving ultimately as Secretary of Navy, or War, of Interior, and finally as Prime Minister with the title of Marqués del Nervión y Grande de España. He died at Seville of poor health, it is believed, from overwork in the Chincha Islands War and was interred in the monument with a procession and great honors	Francisco Armero Peñaranda
1797	Antonio	Barceló y Pont de la Terra	A man of modest birth, originally a privateer in the service of the Spanish Navy, he ended by being an admiral in it in charge of operations against the Algerian pirates. He died in retirement at Mallorca, his native island.	Antonio Barceló
1890	Juan	Bautista de Antequera y Bobadilla de Eslava	After a distinguished career as a fighting commander in the last century of the Spanish Empire, he was Senator once and Secretary of the Navy (Ministro de Marina) twice, during which time he devised the Code of Naval Regulations (Revista General de Marina). He died in 1890 of natural causes, was moved to the Pantheon in 1922	Juan Bautista Antequera y Bobadilla
1898	Joaquín	Bustamante y Quevedo	Professional naval officer and inventor of torpedoes and mines, as Admiral Cervera's Chief of Staff at the Battle of Santiago de Cuba, he was assigned command of a shore party that retook the San Juan Hills. Wounded in the abdomen he died a month later. His remains were moved to the Pantheon in 1899.	Joaquín Bustamante y Quevedo
1868	José María	Bustillo y Gómez de Barreda	Having joined the Navy at 14, he advanced to ship captain, then through various ships to admiral of various districts, becoming finally Minister of the Navy. For his command of various politically sensitive operations he was made Conde (Count) de Bustillo by the queen. He died in service of natural causes.	José María Bustillo y Barreda
1842	Diego	Butrón y Cortés	Professional naval officer who, after an illustrious career in ships, having fought in many battles, and having served a brief captivity in Portsmouth prison, rose to ministerial rank. He retired as ministro del Tribunal Supremo de Guerra y Marina in 1836, died in old age at Madrid in 1842, and was moved to the Panteon in 1911.	Diego Butrón Cortés
1936	Pedro Maria	Cardona y Prieto	Professional naval officer who, after an illustrious career, retiring as captain in 1931, was shot into a ditch by the Republican Army in the Spanish Civil War for refusing an offer to command the Republican Navy. He was interred in the Panteon in 2000.	Pedro Cardona Prieto
1588	Álvaro	de Bazán y Guzmán	Professional naval officer, Marqués de Santa Cruz, a fighting commander of the Spanish fleet, who never lost a battle	Álvaro de Bazán, 1st Marquis of Santa Cruz
1909	Pascual	Cervera y Topete	Born into a military family of Cadiz, Cervera entered the Naval Academy at 13, and came to serve in Spain's colonial possessions: Cuba, the Mediterranean, and the Philippines. Rising through various command and administrative positions, he became Rear Admiral (Contra-almiranti). He was posted to Cuba in 1897 to resolve the crises there, but it was too late and too little. He led the Spanish forces to destruction at the Battle of Santiago de Cuba, was captured, became an American celebrity, and was paroled, to become Spanish Chief of Staff to the Navy. He died in retirement, having received the prime medals of France and Spain, and was interred in the Pantheon.	Pascual Cervera y Topete
1952	Juan	Cervera Valderrama	Chief of staff of the navy of the Nationalist faction during the Spanish Civil War, interred in the Pantheon by Francoist Spain in 1962. In 2024, the Association for Democratic Military Memory submitted a petition to the Ministry of Defense requesting the exhumation of his remains under the provisions of the 2022 Democratic Memory Law because of his support for the Francoist dictatorship.	Juan Cervera Valderrama
1718	Francisco	Chacón Medina Salazar	Spanish Marine Infantry field marshal and politician, Captain General of the Canary Islands, killed in action in the Battle of Cape Passaro during the War of the Quadruple Alliance.	Francisco Chacón Medina Salazar
1829	Gabriel	Císcar y Císcar	Naval officer, mathematician, and politician.	Gabriel Císcar y Císcar
1506	Christopher	Columbus	Genoese navigator and explorer who discovered the Americas in Spanish service.	Christopher Columbus
1821	Juan José	de Carranza y Vivero	Professional naval officer, born in Cadiz, son of a Captain with a Basque name converted to Spanish, and a Spanish mother, he joined the Navy at 16, in time for the Battle of Trafalgar aboard the Argonauta. Wounded and taken prisoner he was given a medal by the Spanish and promoted to Lieutenant. On exchange he held a number of commands. He was killed in 1821 as commander of the Andaluz engaging a separatist vessel and was unceremoniously buried at sea. He is commemorated in the Pantheon.	Juan José Carranza Vivero
1915	José	de Casado y Ferreiro	After a distinguished career in the navy culminating in a rank of 2nd Class Petty Officer (Contramaestre), Casado resigned for health reasons to join the Naval Construction Society of Ferrol. He died in an industrial accident on the Battleship Spain then under construction and was later commemorated in the monument for his prior service at the Battle of Santiago de Cuba, where he leaped into the water to save a man.	José Casado Ferreiro
1805	Cosme Damián	de Churruca y Elorza	A navy officer and politician, killed in action during the Battle of Trafalgar while in command of the ship of the line San Juan Nepomuceno.	Cosme Damián de Churruca y Elorza
1810	José	de Córdoba y Rojas	Naval and army officer who played an important role in the early stages of the Argentine War of Independence, during which he was captured and executed.	José de Córdoba y Rojas
1796	Luis	de Córdova y Córdova	Naval officer best known for his service during the Anglo-Spanish War of 1779–1783.	Luis de Córdova y Córdova
1510	Juan	de la Cosa	Castilean-Basque navigator and cartographer who owned and captained the caravel Santa María, Christopher Columbus's flagship during his 1492 voyage of discovery to the Americas. De la Cosa is known for designing the earliest European world map which incorporated the territories of the Americas, ca. 1500. He later made additional expeditions to the Americas, where he was killed.	Juan de la Cosa
1801	Manuel Antonio	de Emparan y Orbe	Naval officer killed in the Second Battle of Algeciras while in command of the ship of the line San Hermenegildo.	Manuel Antonio de Emparan y Orbe
1814	Antonio	de Escaño y García de Cáceres	Naval officer, academic, politician, and Minister of the Navy (1808–1810), second-in-command of Spanish ships at the Battle of Trafalgar.	Antonio de Escaño
1804	José Manuel	de Goicoa y Labart	Naval officer killed during the Action of 5 October 1804 while in command of the frigate Nuestra Señora de las Mercedes	José Manuel de Goicoa y Labart
	Manuel	Deschamps Martínez		Manuel Deschamps Martínez
	Juan	Domingo Deslobbes y Cortés		Juan Domingo Deslobbes y Cortés
	Segundo	Díaz de Herrera y Serrano		Segundo Díaz de Herrera y Serrano
1516	Juan	Díaz de Solís	Navigator and explorer thought to be the first European to land in what is now Uruguay.	Juan Díaz de Solís
1887	José Luis	Díez y Pérez Muñoz	Naval officer and professor.	José Luis Díez y Pérez Muñoz
1926	Juan Manuel	Durán González	Record-setting naval aviator.	Juan Manuel Durán González
1801	José	Esguerra y Guirior	Naval officer killed in the Second Battle of Algeciras while in command of the ship of the line Real Carlos.	José Esguerra y Guirior
1908	Cesáreo	Fernández Duro	Naval officer, writer, scholar and historian.	Cesáreo Fernández Duro
1797	Claude	Francois Renard de Fuchsemberg	A member of the French nobility (Marquis de Amblimont) serving in the Spanish navy (as Conde de Amblimont), he was allowed a lateral transfer from the French navy to the Spanish navy in 1795 when a reorganization of the former left him without a post. He became a commodore commanding Division 5 (consisting of six ships) of Squadron 3, the rear guard of the Spanish fleet at the Battle of Cape St Vincent (1797), where he was killed on the quarterdeck of the ship of the line Conde de Regla, and was buried at sea	Conde de Amblimont
1797	Tomás	Geraldino Geraldino	Naval officer killed during the Battle of Cape St. Vincent while in command of the ship of the line San Nicolás.	Tomás Geraldino Geraldino
1889	José	González Hontoria	Naval officer and Spanish Marine Infantry field marshal who was a successful designer of naval guns. Interred at the Pantheon in 1907.	José González Hontoria
1806	Federico Carlos	Gravina y Nápoli	Naval officer who commanded the Spanish fleet in the Battle of Trafalgar and eventually died of wounds suffered during the battle.	Federico Gravina
1972	Julio	Guillén Tato	Admiral and historian.	Julio Guillén Tato
1810	Juan Antonio	Gutiérrez de la Concha	Naval officer with a long history of service in the Viceroyalty of the Río de la Plata, executed for plotting against the revolutionaries during the Argentine War of Independence.	Juan Antonio Gutiérrez de la Concha
	Mateo	Hernández Ocampo		Mateo Hernández Ocampo
1891	Luis	Hernández Pinzón y Álvarez	Admiral who commanded the Spanish Navy's Pacific Squadron during tensions in South America prior to the outbreak of the Chincha Islands War.	Luis Hernández Pinzón y Álvarez
	Francisco	Herrera Cruzat		Francisco Herrera Cruzat
1829	Baltasar	Hidalgo de Cisneros	Naval officer and colonial administrator who fought in the Battle of Cape St. Vincent and the Battle of Trafalgar	Baltasar Hidalgo de Cisneros
	Jaime	Janer Róbinson		Jaime Janer Róbinson
1773	Jorge	Juan y Santacilia	Naval officer, diplomat, mathematician, scientist, astronomer, and engineer who contributed to the modernization and professionalization of the Spanish Navy. He was a leading scientific figure of the Enlightenment in Spain, and his career as a public servant constitutes an important chapter in the Bourbon Reforms of the 18th century.	Jorge Juan y Santacilia
1834	Ángel	Laborde Navarro	Naval officer known for his defense of the Spanish Empire in the Spanish American wars of independence in the early 19th century.	Ángel Laborde Navarro
	Rafael De	Laiglesia Darrac		Rafael De Laiglesia Darrac
1921	José María	Lazaga y Ruiz	Alférez de navio (the higher of the Spanish Navy's two ensign ranks) who died of wounds he suffered while commanding boats engaged in evacuating personnel from besieged positions at Sidi Dris during the Rif War.	José María Lazaga y Ruiz
1741	Blas de	Lezo	Admiral whose fleet defeated a British invasion force in the Battle of Cartagena de Indias in 1741.	Blas de Lezo
1810	Santiago	Liniers y Bremond	French-born Spanish officer who served as viceroy of the Viceroyalty of the Río de la Plata, the hero of the reconquest of Buenos Aires after the first British invasion of the River Plate.	Santiago de Liniers, 1st Count of Buenos Aires
1876	Miguel	Lobo y Malagamba	Admiral proclaimed a hero by the Spanish Cortes in 1866 after his participation in the Chincha Islands War, during which he took command of the Pacific Squadron after its commander, Contralmirante (Counter Admiral) Casto Méndez Núñez was wounded during the Battle of Callao.	Miguel Lobo y Malagamba
1521	Ferdinand	Magellan	Portuguese explorer who planned and led the 1519–1522 Magellan expedition to the East Indies, during which he discovered the Strait of Magellan, performed the first European crossing of the Pacific Ocean, and made the first known European contact with the Philippines. He was killed in a battle in the Philippines, but his expedition continued under the command of the Spanish navigator Juan Sebastián Elcano and reached Spain in 1522, achieving the first circumnavigation of Earth.	Ferdinand Magellan
1810	Alejandro	Malaspina Melilupi	Italian-born Spanish Navy officer and explorer who made a voyage around the world from 1786 to 1788, then from 1789 to 1794 undertook the Malaspina Expedition, a scientific expedition in the Pacific Ocean which explored and mapped much of the west coast of the Americas from Cape Horn to the Gulf of Alaska and visited Guam, the Philippines, New Zealand, Australia, and Tonga.	Alessandro Malaspina
1880	José	Malcampo y Monge	Noble, admiral, and politician who served as Prime Minister of Spain from October to December 1871.	José Malcampo, 3rd Marquis of San Rafael
1916	Víctor	María Concas y Paláu	Naval officer, writer, politician, and Minister of the Navy (1905–1906 and 1909–1910).	Víctor María Concas y Paláu
1817	Ignacio	Maria de Álava y Sáenz de Navarrete	Admiral of the Spanish fleet after a distinguished career demonstrating unswerving loyalty to Spain	Ignacio Maria de Álava y Sáenz de Navarrete
	José	María Manuel Céspedes y Pineda		José María Manuel Céspedes y Pineda
1886	Francisco de Paula	Márquez y Roco	Naval officer and astronomer.	Francisco de Paula Márquez y Roco
	Cripiano	Mauleón Godoy		Cripiano Mauleón Godoy
	Ignacio María	Mendizábal Vildosola		Ignacio María Mendizábal Vildosola
1869	Casto	Méndez Núñez	Contralmirante (counter admiral), commanding officer of the armored frigate Numancia, commander of the Spanish squadron in the Battle of Callao in 1866 during the Chincha Islands War. Buried at Pontevedra in 1869, reburied at Moaña in 1874, moved to the Pantheon in 1883.	Casto Méndez Núñez
1920	Augusto	Miranda Godoy	Admiral who served three times as Minister of the Navy (1913–1917, 1918, and 1919) and became a member of the Council of State in 1913 and a life member of the Senate of Spain in 1914. During his first stint as minister of the navy he oversaw a major naval construction program that included the birth of the Spanish submarine force.	Augusto Miranda Godoy
1945	Francisco	Moreno Fernández	Admiral in the navy of the Nationalist faction during the Spanish Civil War, interred in the Pantheon by Francoist Spain in 1952. In 2024, the Association for Democratic Military Memory submitted a petition to the Ministry of Defense requesting the exhumation of his remains under the provisions of the 2022 Democratic Memory Law because of his support for the Francoist dictatorship.	Francisco Moreno Fernández
1966	Salvador	Moreno Fernández	Admiral who served twice as Minister of the Navy (1939–1945 and 1951–1957) of Francoist Spain, interred in the Pantheon by the Francoist government. In 2024, the Association for Democratic Military Memory submitted a petition to the Ministry of Defense requesting the exhumation of his remains under the provisions of the 2022 Democratic Memory Law because of his support for the Francoist dictatorship. Hsi remains were exhumed on 3 August 2024 and returned to his family.	Salvador Moreno Fernández
1820	Francisco Antonio	Mourelle de la Rúa	Naval officer who explored the Pacific Ocean.	Francisco Antonio Mourelle
1772	Juan José	Navarro de Viana y Búfalo	The first captain general of the Navy (1750–1772), he was a leading proponent of naval reform and provided much of the practical curriculum for the Academia de Guardias Marinas (Academy of Midshipmen), which provided professional training for Spanish Navy officers.	Juan José Navarro, 1st Marquis of la Victoria
	José	Navarro Torres		José Navarro Torres
1931	Pedro	Novo y Colson	Naval officer, historian, poet, playwright, and politician.	Pedro Novo y Colson
	Nicolás	Otero Figueroa		Nicolás Otero Figueroa
1493	Martín Alonso	Pinzón	Mariner, shipbuilder, navigator and explorer, captain of the caravel Pinta during Christopher Columbus's 1492 voyage of discovery to the Americas. Died ca. 1493.	Martín Alonso Pinzón
1514	Vicente Yáñez	Pinzón	Navigator and explorer captain of the caravel Niña during Christopher Columbus's 1492 voyage of discovery to the Americas. Died sometime after 1514.	Vicente Yáñez Pinzón
1819	Rosendo	Porlier y Astiegueta	Naval officer who fought in the Battle of Cape Finisterre and the Battle of Trafalgar.	Rosendo Porlier y Astiegueta
1891	Cecilio	Pujazón y García	Astronomer, Director of the Real Instituto y Observatorio de la Armada	Cecilio Pujazón y García
1780	Andrés	Reggio Brachiforte	Naval officer who fought in the War of the Quadruple Alliance and served as captain general of the Navy from 1749 to 1780.	Andrés Reggio
	Francisco	Riquelme Ponce de León		Francisco Riquelme Ponce de León
1852	José	Rodríguez de Arias y Álvarez Campana	Officer with a 76-year naval career who fought in the Battle of Trafalgar and became the 21st captain general of the Navy in 1847.	José Rodríguez de Arias y Álvarez Campana
1835	Juan	Ruiz de Apodaca y Eliza	Naval officer and colonial administrator who served as the viceroy of New Spain 1816 to 1821 during the Mexican War of Independence.	Juan Ruiz de Apodaca, 1st Count of Venadito
1890	Francisco Javier de	Salas y Rodríguez-Morzo	Naval officer and historian.	Francisco Javier de Salas y Rodríguez-Morzo
	Blas	Salcedo y Gutiérrez del Pozo		Blas Salcedo y Gutiérrez del Pozo
1875	Victoriano	Sánchez Barcáiztegui	Naval officer famed for his actions while in command of the screw frigate Almansa during the Battle of Callao in 1866, when, as a fire threatened the ship's gunpowder magazine, he refused his officers' request to flood it to avoid an explosion, saying "Today is not a day to wet the powder." He was killed in action during the Third Carlist War.	Victoriano Sánchez Barcáiztegui
1806	Pedro Pablo	Sanguineto Basso	Naval officer who distinguished himself in 1790 as one of the commanders whose voyages helped to correct the charts of the Falkland Islands and the Strait of Magellan.	Pedro Pablo Sanguineto Basso
	José de la	Serna y Occina		José de la Serna y Occina
1806	José	Solano y Bote	Naval officer and colonial administrator who became captain general of the Navy in 1804.	José Solano y Bote
1781	Zenón de	Somodevilla y Bengoechea	Statesman and enlightened politician who held the positions of secretary of the treasury , secretary of war and the navy, secretary of the Indies, Superintendent General of Revenues, Lieutenant General of the Admiralty, and Notary of the Kingdoms of Spain. He was a member of the Council of State during the reigns of Philip V, Ferdinand VI, and Charles III.	Zenón de Somodevilla y Bengoechea
1795	Vicente	Tofiño de San Miguel y Vandelvalle	Naval officer, astronomer, and cosmographer.	Vicente Tofiño de San Miguel y Vandelvalle
1819	Joaquín	Toledo y Parra	Naval officer who fought in the Americas and was lost at sea off Cape Horn.	Joaquín Toledo y Parra
1795	Antonio	de Ulloa y de la Torre-Giralt	Vicealmirante (vice admiral) and colonial administrator who performed important scientific work in the Americas, becoming a major figure of the Enlightenment in Spain.	Antonio de Ulloa
1842	Francisco Javier de	Uriarte y Borja	Naval officer and explorer who fought in the Battle of Trafalgar and became the 18th captain general of the Navy in 1836. His remains were transferred to the Pantheon by a royal decree of 1983.	Francisco Javier de Uriarte y Borja
1835	Cayetano	Valdés y Flores	Naval officer and explorer who served in the Anglo-French War the French Revolutionary Wars, and the Napoleonic Wars, seeing action in the Battle of Cape Spartel, the Battle of Cape St. Vincent, and the Battle of Trafalgar. His most notable explorations were in the Pacific Northwest of North America, where he and Dionisio Alcalá Galiano conducted the first circumnavigation of Vancouver Island. He eventually became Captain General of Cádiz and Captain General of the Navy.	Cayetano Valdés y Flores
	Juan	Varela Ulloa		Juan Varela Ulloa
1872	Casimiro	Vigodet y Garnica	Naval officer and politician who served as Minister of the Navy in 1839 and in 1852 and became the final captain general of the Navy in 1866.	Casimiro Vigodet y Garnica
1898	Fernando	Villaamil y Fernández Cueto	Naval officer who designed Destructor, the first destroyer. He was killed in action in the Battle of Santiago de Cuba.	Fernando Villaamil
1830	Juan María de	Villavicencio y la Serna	Naval officer and politician, captain general of the Navy from 1817 to 1830.	Juan María de Villavicencio y la Serna
1797	Francisco Javier	Winthuysen y Pineda	Naval officer who fought in the Anglo-Spanish War of 1779–1783 and was killed in action while serving as a squadron commander during the Battle of Cape St. Vincent.	Francisco Javier Winthuysen y Pineda
	Antonio	Yepes Arigori		Antonio Yepes Arigori
	Joaquín	Zarauz Santander		Joaquín Zarauz Santander

== Gallery of gravestones ==
Call to service

The solemn moment has arrived to fight. This is what the sacred name of Spain and the honor of its glorious flag demands of us. ... Long live Spain! Battle stations, and may the Lord welcome our souls!

— Pascual Cervera y Topete, fleet commander, Address to the Spanish fleet before the Battle of Santiago de Cuba, 1898
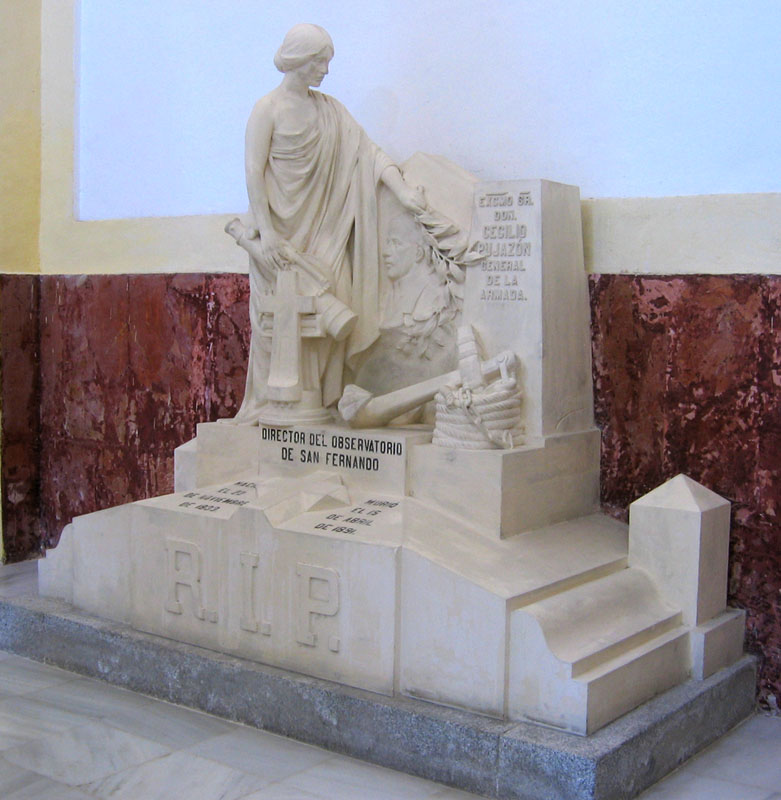
Cecilio Pujazón y García

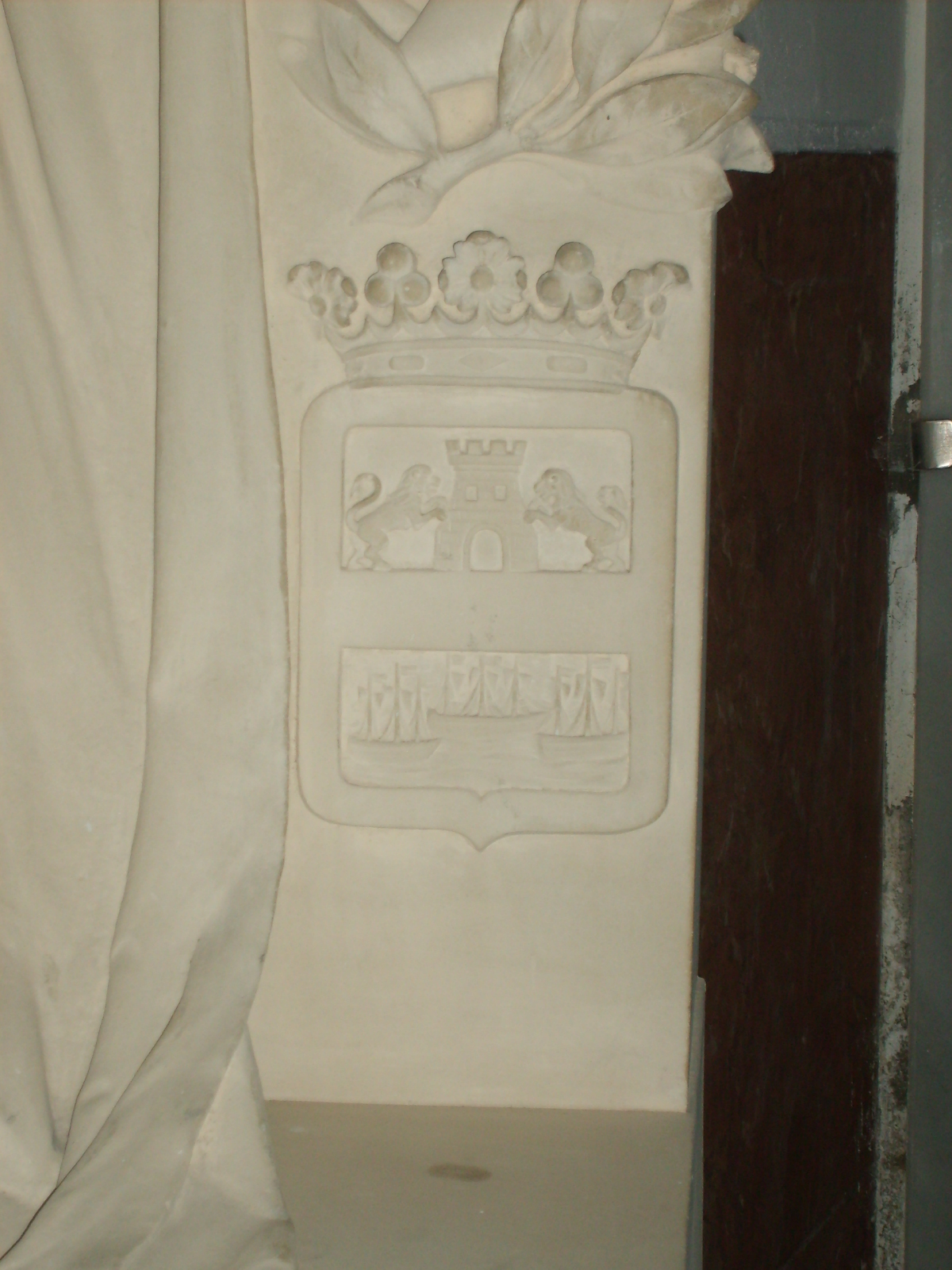

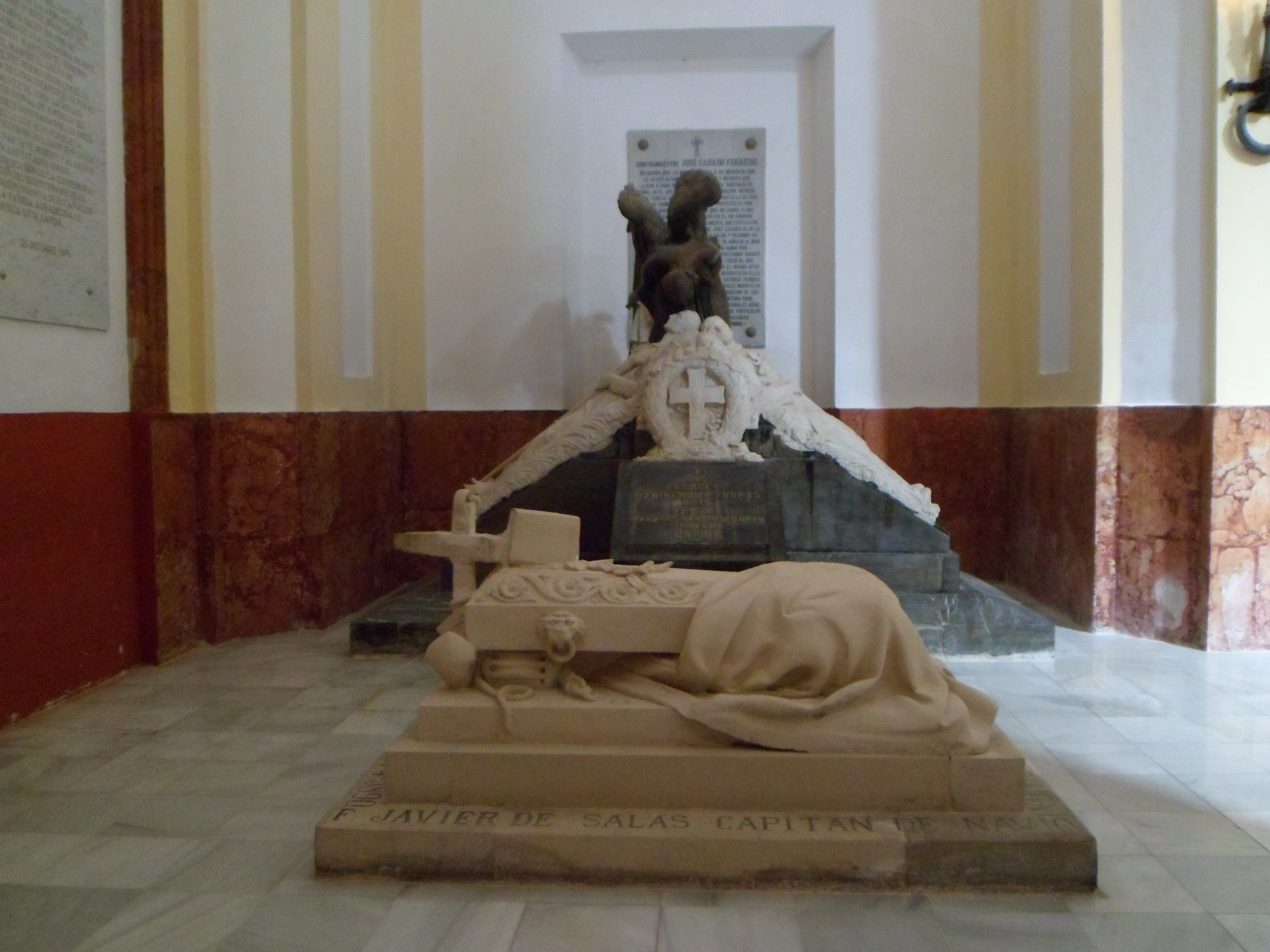
"Javier de Salas Capitan"

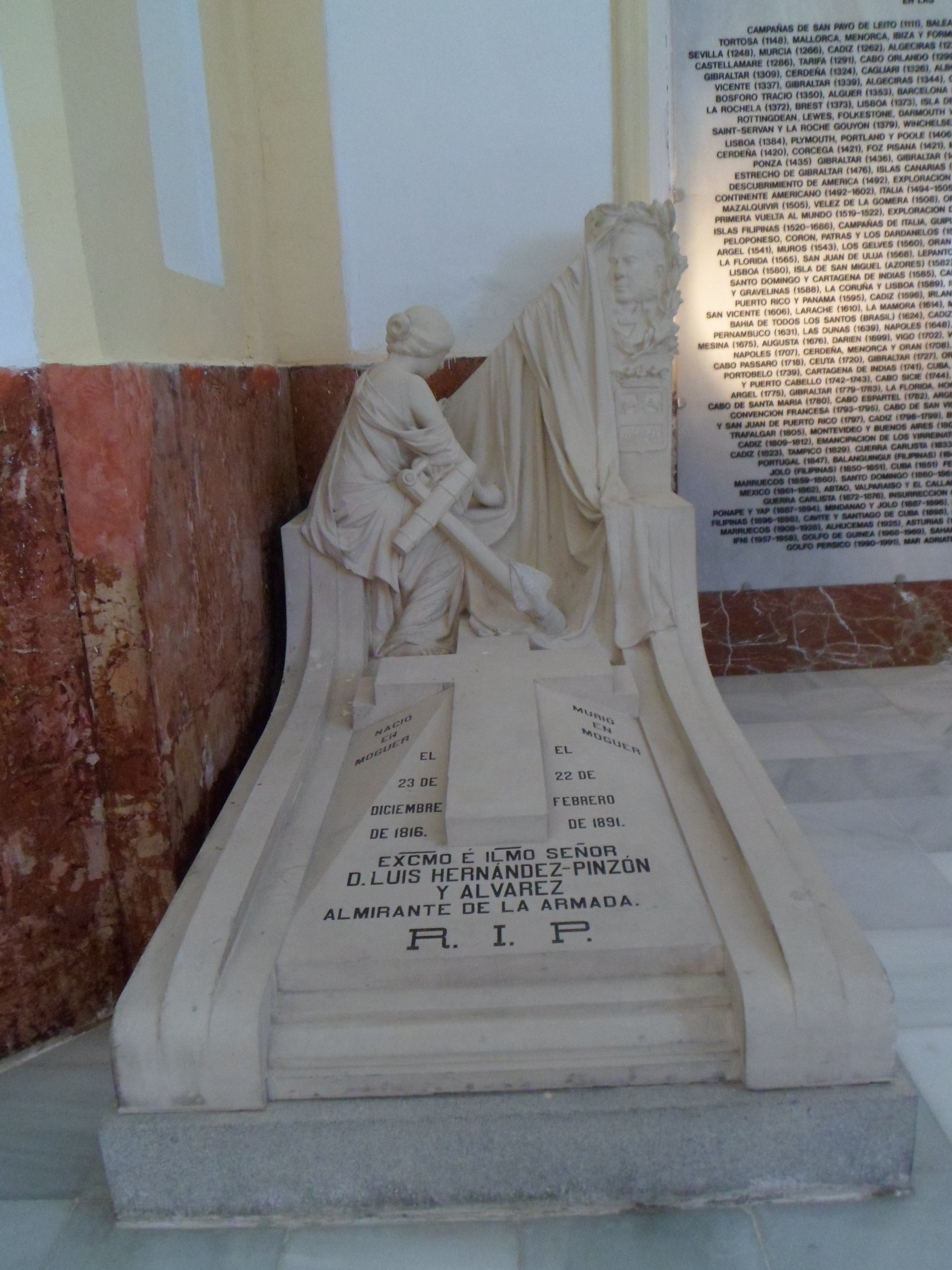
