= Spanish sloop Sánchez Barcáiztegui =

Spanish Navy sloop of 1877–1895

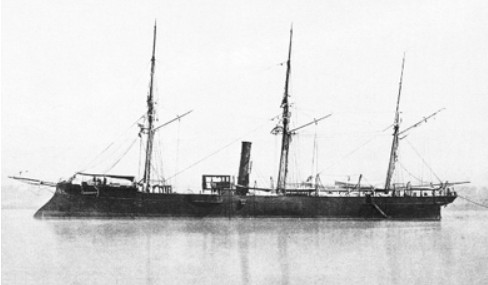

History

Spain
- Name: Sánchez Barcáiztegui
- Namesake: Capitán de navío de primera clase (Ship-of-the-Line Captain) First Class Victoriano Sánchez Barcáiztegui (1826–1875), Spanish Navy hero
- Builder: Société Nouvelle des Forges et Chantiers de la Méditerranée, La Seyne-sur-Mer, France
- Laid down: 23 December 1875
- Launched: 23 March 1876
- Completed: 1877
- Commissioned: 12 July 1877
- Fate: Sunk in collision 18 September 1895

General characteristics
- Class & type: Jorge Juan-class sloop
- Displacement: 920 to 935 tons (see text)
- Length: 63.73 m (209 ft 1 in) overall (see text)
- Beam: 9.05 m (29 ft 8 in) (see text)
- Draft: 4.72 m (15.5 ft) (see text)
- Depth: 5.5 m (18 ft 1 in)
- Installed power: 1,100 ihp (820 kW)
- Propulsion: One steam engine, one shaft, 128 to 480 tons coal (see text)
- Sail plan: Barque-rigged; sail area of 1,125 m^{2} (12,109 sq ft)
- Speed: 11 to 13 knots (20 to 24 km/h; 13 to 15 mph) (see text)
- Range: 1,690 nmi (3,130 km; 1,940 mi) (at economical cruising speed)
- Complement: 146 to 160 (see text)
- Armament: 2 × 160 mm (6.3 in) Parrott guns; 2 × 75 mm (2.95 in) Krupp guns; 1 × 80 mm (3.1 in) bronze cannon; 2 × machine guns

Sánchez Barcáiztegui was a Jorge Juan-class sloop of the Spanish Navy commissioned in 1877. She spent her career on colonial service in the Caribbean, seeing action in the Ten Years' War and the Cuban War of Independence. She was sunk in a collision off Cuba in 1895.

Sánchez Barcáiztegui was named for Capitán de navío de primera clase (Ship-of-the-Line Captain) First Class Victoriano Sánchez Barcáiztegui (1826–1875), a Spanish Navy hero of the Chincha Islands War in 1866 and the Third Carlist War during 1874–1875.

== Technical characteristics ==
Sánchez Barcáiztegui had a composite hull, one funnel, three masts, and a barque rig. Sources differ on her dimensions. According to one, she displaced 920 tons, was 63.73 metres (209 ft 1 in) long overall, and had a beam of 9.05 metres (29 ft 8 in) and a draft of 4.72 metres (15 ft 6 in), while Spanish-language sources assert that she displaced 935 tons, was 62 metres (203 ft 5 in) long, and had a beam of 10 metres (32 ft 10 in) and a draft of 4.80 metres (15 ft 9 in). Her depth of hull was 5.55 metres (18 ft 3 in). She had a crew of either 146 or 160.

Sánchez Barcáiztegui had a 1,100-horsepower (820-kilowatt) steam engine driving a single screw. She could carry up to either 128 tons or 480 tons of coal, according to different sources, giving her a range of 1,690 nautical miles (3,130 km; 1,940 mi) at an economical cruising speed. Sources disagree on her maximum speed, stating both that it was 11 knots (20 km/h; 13 mph) and 13 knots (24 km/h; 15 mph). Her sail area was 1,125 square metres (12,109 square feet).

Sánchez Barcáiztegui′s armament consisted of two 160 mm (6.3 in) Parrott rifled muzzle loaders, two 75 mm (2.95 in) Krupp guns, one 80 mm (3.1 in) bronze cannon, and two machine guns.

== Construction and commissioning ==
Sánchez Barcáiztegui was one of a class of two sloops — the Spanish Navy classified them initially as screw avisos, then later reclassified them as "second-class" cruisers" and later still as "third-class cruisers" — built for service in the Third Carlist War (1872–1876) as part of a naval construction plan ordered by Minister of the Navy Rafael Rodríguez de Arias. The Société Nouvelle des Forges et Chantiers de la Méditerranée in La Seyne-sur-Mer, France, constructed both Sánchez Barcáiztegui and her sister ship, Jorge Juan, under the supervision of the Spanish Navy engineer Joaquín Togores. Both ships' keels were laid down on 23 December 1875, both were launched on 23 March 1876, and after fitting out both were delivered to the Spanish Navy and commissioned on 12 July 1877.

== Operational history ==
=== 1877–1895 ===
The Third Carlist War had ended by the time Sánchez Barcáiztegui and Jorge Juan were commissioned. Their design made them suitable for colonial service as gunboats in the Spanish Empire, so they received orders to deploy to the Captaincy General of Cuba, where Spanish forces had been fighting Cuban insurgents in the Ten Years' War since 1868. After her arrival in the Caribbean, Sánchez Barcáiztegui was stationed at the naval base at Havana on the northwest coast of Cuba, and subsequently conducted frequent surveillance and coastal patrol operations to prevent the smuggling of weapons, ammunition, and troops to the insurgents.

On 7 December 1877, the merchant ship SS Moctzeuma arrived at Puerto Plata in the Dominican Republic, where several Cuban insurgents boarded her posing as passengers. After she put back to sea, the insurgents murdered Moctezuma′s captain and several members of the crew who resisted them and commandeered the ship for use as a privateer, intending to attack Spanish shipping in the Caribbean. Sánchez Barcáiztegui, Jorge Juan, and the screw corvette Tornado were among the Spanish warships that set out to hunt down Moctezuma. Jorge Juan found Moctezuma on 3 January 1878 while patrolling with Tornado off Central America's Mosquito Coast.

=== Loss ===
The Cuban War of Independence broke out in 1895, again pitting Spanish forces in Cuba against insurgents. At midnight on 18 September 1895, Sánchez Barcáiztegui — with the commander of the Havana Naval base, Contraalmirante (Counter Admiral) Manuel Delgado y Parejo embarked — was off Havana near Morro Castle, operating with her lights off in an effort to surprise several Cuban insurgent ships. The Spanish merchant steamer Conde de Mortera, bound from Nuevitas, Cuba, to Havana carrying cargo and passengers, entered the bay on a collision course with Sánchez Barcáiztegui.

When Sánchez Barcáiztegui's crew sighted the approaching steamer, her commanding officer, Capitán de fragata (Frigate Captain) Francisco Ibáñez Varela, ordered his ship to turn to starboard. At that moment, an oiler's hand got stuck in the warship's dynamo, causing the dynamo's drive belt to break, plunging the ship into darkness, and disabling her primary steering mechanism. Sánchez Barcáiztegui's crew tried to correct her course using a servomotor, but the servomotor was too slow for Sánchez Barcáiztegui to answer her helm in time. At the same time, Conde de Mortera made an ill-advised turn to port which kept her on a collision course with Sánchez Barcáiztegui.

Conde de Mortera collided with Sánchez Barcáiztegui, striking her on her port bow. The merchant ship's bow became lodged in the sloop's side. Afraid that Sánchez Barcáiztegui would sink and drag his own ship down with her, Conde de Mortera's captain, José Viñolas y Valle, ordered his ship's engines reversed. This succeeded in breaking Conde de Mortera free of Sánchez Barcáiztegui, but it also opened the hole in Sánchez Barcáiztegui's side completely to the sea, accelerating the ingress of water. Seeing that Sánchez Barcáiztegui could not be saved, Ibáñez ordered his crew to abandon ship. Some sailors jumped overboard, while others manned her lifeboats.

The 67-year-old Delgado declined the offer to be evacuated and remained aboard Sánchez Barcáiztegui until five minutes before she sank, when an alférez de navío (ship-of-the-line ensign, the higher of the Spanish Navy's two ensign ranks) took him to one of the remaining lifeboats. The lifeboat did not have time to reach a safe distance, and when the sinking Sánchez Barcáiztegui capsized she swamped several lifeboats, including Delgado's, causing them to capsize as well. Exhausted, Delgado ordered the two men who were keeping him afloat to leave him to drown and swim away. They refused at first, but at his insistence finally had to leave him to his fate because of the danger of all three of them perishing.

Ibáñez waited until the last moment before jumping into the water. Sharks, attracted to the scene by the smell of blood, attacked and killed him. His mutilated body, headless and armless, was found the next day. In all, 32 men died in the sinking, including Delgado and Ibáñez.

Sánchez Barcáiztegui's wreck posed a navigational hazard, and efforts to salvage it began a few days after the sinking. In 1896, the wreck's masts and funnel were removed, eliminating the hazard.

A court-martial was convened on 17 November 1897 to ascertain responsibility for the loss of Sánchez Barcáiztegui. Although the court could not clearly prove that Viñolas was at fault, it sentenced him to three months' arrest and ordered him to pay compensation.
