= Sierra Almagrera =

Coordinates: 37°17′N 1°45′W

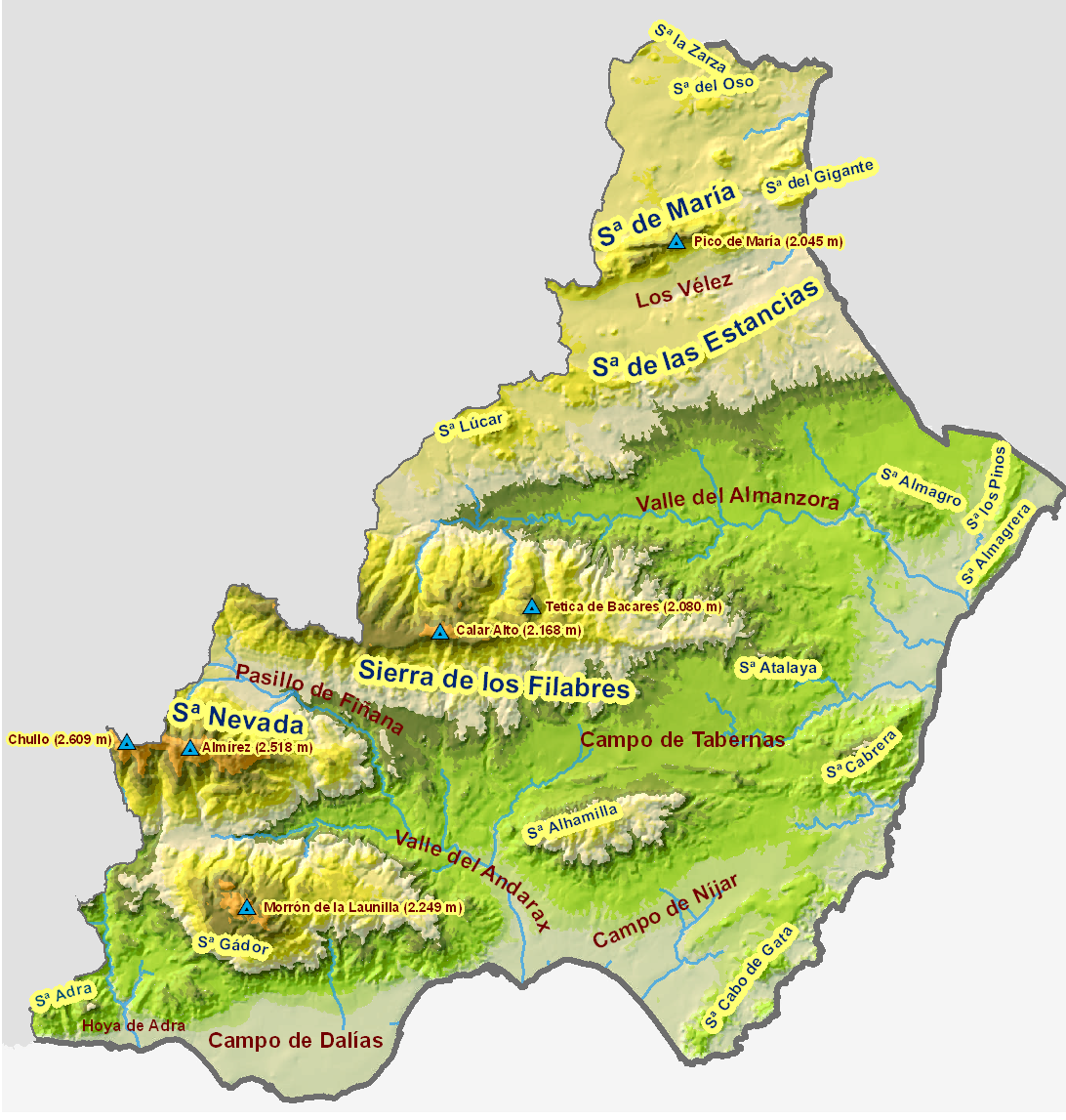

The Sierra Almagrera is a mountain range near the Mediterranean coast in the east of the Province of Almería in Spain. Its highest point is 366 m above sea level. It belong to the Penibaetic System and is entirely located within the municipality of the Cuevas de Almanzora.

Geologically, it rose from the seabed along a multitude of faults, which over geological time became filled with veins of lead and silver ore, such as silver-bearing galena. This made this mountain range an important area for extracting such minerals, beginning in 1838 when the veins were re-discovered (Phoenician colonies in the area such as Baria with its salt factory and necropolis had previously extracted ores in the area).

Mineral extraction transformed the range's landscape during the 19th century and much of the 20th century, filling the area with foundries and bringing railways into the area to transport the minerals to the port of Almería. Typical to the area is the mineral jarosite, named for its abundance in the Almagrera mountain range in the so-called Jaroso ravine (barranco del Jaroso).

It is considered as part of the EU Special Area of Conservation of the Almagrera Range, the los Pinos Range and the Aguilón due to its coastal mountain range home to rugged landscapes, flora and fauna of special interest.

== See also ==
- Cuevas del Almanzora

== Bibliography ==
- (in Spanish) FERNÁNDEZ BOLEA, E. El ingeniero Antonio de Falces Yesares y la capilla de la Virgen del Carmen de Cuevas del Almanzora. Mojácar (Almería): Arráez Editores, S.L., 2004. ISBN 84-89 606-65-X

== External links (in Spanish) ==
- BAJO LOS ESPARTALES
- Paisaje minero de Interés Cultural Sierra Almagrera
