= Manuel Antonio de Emparan y Orbe =

Manuel Antonio Ramón de Emparan y Orbe (16 March 1754 – 12 July 1801) was a Spanish Navy officer.

== Family ==
Emparan y Orbe family tree.

He was the legitimate son of José Joaquín de Emparan (fourteenth lord of the House of Emparan and - in his maternal line - fifteen times great grandson of Alfonso XI of Castille) and María Ana Orbe y Zarauz (niece of Andrés de Orbe y Larreátegui, to whom Philip V granted the Castilian title of Marquis of Valde-Espina).

Manuel's brother Francisco inherited the estate of the House of Emparan, whilst other brothers had distinguished military and political careers - Agustín Ignacio was a knight of the Order of Charles III, Miguel José was a brigadier in the royal fleet, Vicente was president, governor and captain general of Venezuela and Pedro de Emparan (or Amparan), settled in Venezuela as an alcalde ordinario when Vicente was made governor of the province of Cumaná. His descendents were related to the family of the Venezuelan independence hero Antonio José de Sucre, grand marshal of Ayacucho and of general José Tadeo Monagas, president of Venezuela.

The Emparan y Orbe family, lords of Azpeitia and Ermua and Marquises of Valde-Espina was directly descended from the houses of Loyola, Balda, Butrón, Haro and Burgundy and through this family line to the monarchs of Asturias, Castille, Leon, Navarre and Portugal, the French Capetian dynasty, the English House of Plantagenet, the German Hohenstaufens, the Kingdom of Scotland, the House of Normandy and the House of Uppsala.

== Life ==
Born in Azpeitia, he first enlisted as a midshipman in the Company of the Department of Cádiz on 22 July 1766, as did his brother José Joaquín (born in 1751) and on 6 February 1770 another brother don Miguel José (born in 1756).

== Bibliography (in Spanish) ==
- Cervera Pery, José (2004). El Panteón de Marinos Ilustres, trayectoria histórica, reseña biográfica. Ministerio de Defensa. Madrid, 2004.
- Cervera y Jácome, Juan (1926). El Panteón de Marinos Ilustres. Ministerio de Marina. Madrid. 1926.
- Fernández Duro, Cesáreo (1895-1903). La Armada Española desde la unión de los reinos de Castilla y Aragón. Est. Tipográfico «Sucesores de Rivadeneyra» 9 tomos. Madrid.
- Paula Pavía, Francisco de (1873). Galería Biográfica de los Generales de Marina. Imprenta J. López. Madrid, 1873.
- Válgoma y Finestrat, Dalmiro de la. Barón de Válgoma (1944-1956). Real Compañía de Guardia Marinas y Colegio Naval. Catálogo de pruebas de Caballeros aspirantes. Instituto Histórico de Marina. Madrid, 7 volumes.
