= Victoriano Sánchez Barcáiztegui =

Spanish naval officer

Don Victoriano Sánchez Barcáiztegui
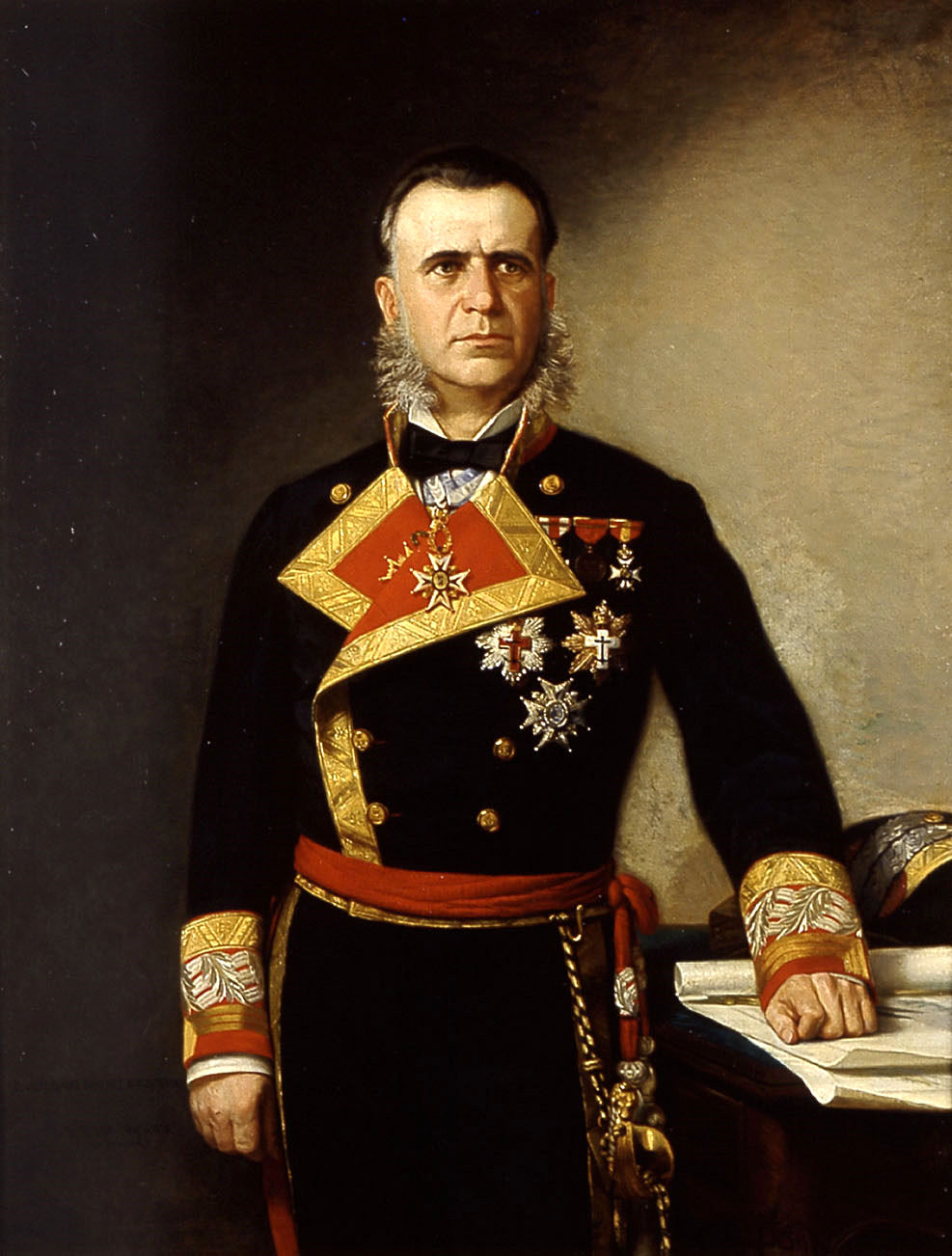
- Born: Victoriano Sánchez Barcáiztegui Acquaroni; 23 April 1826; Ferrol, Spain
- Died: 26 May 1875 (aged 49); Cantabrian Sea off Motrico, Spain
- Cause of death: Killed in action
- Burial place: Panteón de Marinos Ilustres, San Fernando, Spain; 36°28′47″N 006°11′37″W
- Military career
- Allegiance: Kingdom of Spain
- Service: Spanish Navy
- Service years: 1839–1875
- Rank: Capitán de navío de primera clase (Ship-of-the-Line Captain First Class)
- Commands: Terrible; Santa Isabel; Don Juan de Austria; Habanero; Santiago de Cuba naval station; Mazareddo; Rio de la Plata naval station; Almansa; Colegio Naval Militar (Naval Military College) (director); Commander-in-chief of Ferrol Naval Base; Commander-in-chief of naval forces in the Cantabrian Sea
- Conflicts: First Italian War of Independence; Chincha Islands War; Battle of Callao; Glorious Revolution; Third Carlist War; Bombardment of Guetaria

Victoriano Sánchez Barcáiztegui Acquaroni (23 April 1826 – 26 May 1875) was a Spanish Navy officer. He played a role in the First Italian War of Independence in 1849 and gained fame in Spain for his performance in the Battle of Callao in 1866. He was killed in action during the Third Carlist War.

== Biography ==
=== Early life ===
Sánchez Barcáiztegui was born in Ferrol, Spain, on 23 April 1826. His father was a capitán de navío (ship-of-the-line captain) in the Spanish Navy, and his maternal uncle was mayor of San Sebastián. After completing his elementary school studies in the Ferrol naval department and passing the naval entrance exam, he enlisted in the Spanish Navy as a midshipman on 31 January 1839; some sources describe him as 13 years old at the time, although his birth date indicates that he was 12.

=== 1839–1866 ===
Sánchez Barcáiztegui's first assignment was to the frigate Isabel II, which he began on 12 April 1839. As a midshipman, he completed his naval training over the next five years aboard Isabel II, the brig Cortés, the guardia marina (coast guard) schooner Minerva, and the brigs Soberano and Manzanares, and also made his first transatlantic voyage in a visit to the Americas. By a Royal Order of 18 March 1844, he was commissioned as an officer and promoted to the rank of alférez de navío (the lower of the Spanish Navy's two ensign ranks); one source claims he received this promotion at the age of 18, although his birth date indicates he was 17 at the time.

Early in his career as an officer, Sánchez Barcáiztegui received the Royal Navy Diadem Cross of Distinction for services rendered to Queen Isabella II and the king consort, Francisco de Asís, Duke of Cádiz, during a voyage they made aboard Isabel II from Valencia to Barcelona. He received a second award of the Royal Navy Diadem Cross for the roles he played in capturing the guardia marina (coast guard) felucca Veloz and the surrender of a fort on the Medes Islands off Catalonia. According to one source, he also served aboard the schooner Cartagena early in his career.

Sánchez Barcáiztegui received his first command on 28 October 1844, when he became commanding officer of the felucca Terrible, a position he held until 9 February 1847. He subsequently made a voyage to Montevideo, Uruguay, aboard the frigate Cortés.

Aboard the steamer Colón, Sánchez Barcáiztegui took part in an expedition to protect the Papal States during the First Italian War of Independence. The expedition began with the departure of a Spanish Navy squadron from Cádiz on 7 January 1849 which, after embarking the troops of Spain's Expeditionary Army Corps along the coasts of Catalonia and Italy, arrived at Gaeta on 14 February 1849. Its arrival calmed the situation, deterring an attack on the Papal States. Once that threat abated, the expedition got underway on 4 May 1849 for Terracina, disembarking troops there who participated in capturing the city. After that, the expedition's ships performed demonstrations off Naples, Gaeta, and Porto D’Auro which succeeded in deterring attacks on those cities and calmed the situation in those areas. On 18 May 1849, the expedition disembarked at Gaeta, where on 29 May Pope Pius IX reviewed members of the Spanish expedition, who displayed for him enemy flags they had captured. Pius IX also blessed the Spaniards and gave them thanks by royal order. Pius IX made Sánchez Barcáiztegui and the other officers of the expedition Knights Commander of the Cross of the Order of St. Gregory the Great. For his service during the expedition, Sánchez Barcáiztegui also received a commendation from the Kingdom of Spain, Pius IX made him a Knight of the Order of Pope Pius IX, and the Kingdom of the Two Sicilies made him a Knight Grand Cross of the Royal Order of Francis I. By a Royal Order of 20 January 1850, he was promoted to the rank of teniente de navío (ship-of-the-line lieutenant). The expedition returned to Spain at Cádiz in mid-March 1850, and by a Royal Order of 12 September 1850 Sánchez Barcáiztegui received an award of the Laureate Cross of Saint Ferdinand First Class for his service as aide to the general staff of the Mediterranean operations division during the expedition to the Papal States.

Sánchez Barcáiztegui subsequently began a tour of duty at Havana in the Captaincy General of Cuba, and while there served aboard the armed paddle steamer Vulcano and the corvette Mazarredo and commanded the steamer Santa Isabel, the paddle steamer Don Juan de Austria, and the brig Habanero, all of which were based at Havana. He also commanded the naval station at Santiago de Cuba on the southeast coast of Cuba.

By a Royal Order of 23 March 1859, Sánchez Barcáiztegui received a promotion to capitán de fragata (frigate captain) and an appointment as commanding officer of Mazarredo, which was assigned to the Naval Apprentices School in the Ferrol estuary. By a Royal Order of 19 February 1862, he was appointed a commander of the Order of Charles III. He returned to Cuba on 21 July 1862 to become port captain at Cárdenas. He returned to Spain in 1864, and in June 1864 by Royal Order received a promotion to capitán de navío de 2ª clase (ship-of-the-line captain 2nd class). By a Royal Order of 8 September 1865, he took command of the Río de la Plata Naval Station at Montevideo.

=== Chincha Islands War ===
The Chincha Islands War broke out between Spain and Chile in September 1865; Ecuador and Peru joined the war on Chile's side in January 1866, as did Bolivia in March 1866. When the new screw frigate Almansa arrived at Montevideo after a voyage from Spain, her commanding officer left her due to ill health, and Sánchez Barcáiztegui stepped in take command of her. Under Sánchez Barcáiztegui, she rounded Cape Horn, entered the Pacific Ocean, and rendezvoused on 9 April 1866 with the Pacific Squadron, which was under the command of Contralmirante (Counter Admiral) Casto Méndez Núñez. On the morning of 2 May 1866, the squadron entered the harbor at Callao, Peru, beginning the Battle of Callao, the largest engagement of the war. Almansa came so close to shore that on several occasions she nearly ran aground, and Peruvian coastal artillery batteries hit her approximately 160 times during the battle, including a hit by a 500-pound (226.8 kg) shell fired by a Blakely gun which set fire to her gunpowder magazine. While the crew tried to put the fire out, his officers advised him to flood the magazine. He wanted to continue fighting, and their recommendation prompted him to utter a phrase which immortalized him in the history of the Spanish Navy: "Today is not a day to wet the powder," adding "We'll all blow up first." He only consented to withdraw from combat temporarily to allow more of Almansa′s crew to fight the fire, and after it was out, the ship returned to combat after an absence of only 30 minutes.

By a Royal Order of 20 June 1866, Sánchez Barcáiztegui received a promotion to capitán de navío (ship-of-the-line captain). For his exploits in the Battle of Callao, he was named a commander of the Order of Isabella the Catholic and awarded the Cross of Naval Merit with Red Decoration Second Class.

=== 1868–1875 ===
After Spain concluded peace with Chile and Peru, Sánchez Barcáiztegui returned to Spain in 1868. While he was on leave in Cádiz, a Spanish Navy squadron commanded by the port captain of Cádiz, Juan Bautista Topete y Carballo, mutinied, beginning the Glorious Revolution. Sánchez Barcáiztegui opposed what he viewed as the debilitating misrule of Isabella II, which he believed was provoking widespread discontent in Spain, so he quickly placed himself under Topete's command and assumed command of the Cádiz Naval Command, hoping to overthrow Isabella II but not to end the Spanish monarchy. The revolution forced Isabella II to abdicate in 1868 and, after a provisional government ruled Spain, Amadeo I became king in 1870.

In November 1870, Sánchez Barcáiztegui became the first director of the Colegio Naval Militar (Naval Military College), housed in the training hulk Asturias (formerly the screw frigate Princesa de Asturias) anchored at Ferrol. By a Royal Order of 6 September 1872 he assumed additional duties as the commander of the Arsenal de Ferrol and second-in-command of the Ferrol naval department.

=== Third Carlist War ===
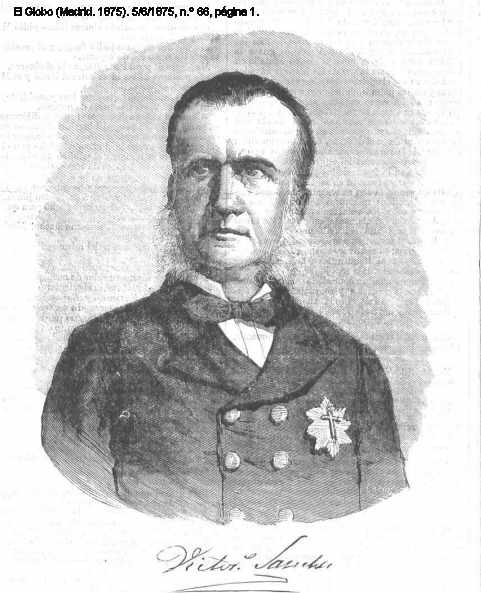
A sketch of Victoriano Sánchez Barcáiztegui, published in El Globo, Madrid, 5 June 1875.

The Third Carlist War broke out in 1872. Suffering from poor health, Sánchez Barcáiztegui requested four months' leave, which he planned to spend in Gijón while he recovered. However, his leave was suspended, and he rushed to Ferrol, resuming his command there as Carlist frigates approached the area. On 7 January 1874, Topete, now Minister of the Navy under the First Spanish Republic, summoned Sánchez Barcáiztegui to Madrid, where Topete gave him command of Spanish naval forces in the Cantabrian Sea along Spain's north coast. When Sánchez Barcáiztegui took command of the Cantabrian naval forces, they consisted of the steamship Cádiz, the corvette Consuelo, three schooners, four small steamships, other smaller vessels, and two merchant ships from Biscay, Cuatro Amigos and Bilbao, which had been militarized to serve as dispatch boats. Over time, other ships arrived to reinforce his squadron.

Sánchez Barcáiztegui's first operation in command of the Cantabrian forces was the transportation of a division of 6,000 men from Santander for an amphibious landing at Bilbao. His naval force for the operation — consisting of the screw frigate Blanca, the armed steamers Ciudad de Cádiz, Ferrolano, and Gaditano, the corvette Consuelo, the schooners Buenaventura, Concordia, and Ferrolano, and the troopships Bilbao, Cervantes, Cuatro Amigos, Fomento, Ibarra, Itálica, Luchana, María Isasi, Matilde, Princesa, and Sofía — disembarked the troops under heavy fire from Carlist coastal artillery batteries. After the landing was complete and Spanish Army operations were underway ashore, Sánchez Barcáiztegui received orders from the Ministry of the Navy to withdraw his squadron to Santander.

Sánchez Barcáiztegui's squadron subsequently sortied from the Estuary of Bilbao and bombarded Carlist coastal positions in order to assist the Spanish Army in its attempts to lift the siege of Bilbao. The squadron supported the government attack on Carlist positions at Saltacaballo on 16 February 1874; bombarded Portugalete, Algorta, Las Arenas, Ciérvan, and the Somorrostro Mountains between 21 and 25 February 1874; attempted an amphibious landing at Las Arenas on 20 March 1874 which had to be abandoned due to bad weather; and bombarded Portugalete, Santurce, Las Arenas, and the Somorrostro Mountains between 25 and 27 March 1874 during the Battle of San Pedro Abanto and again in the final days of the siege of Bilbao between 28 and 30 April 1874. Once Carlist troops withdrew from Portugalete, the squadron reentered the Estuary of Bilbao. From then on, the estuary was the scene only of sporadic fighting.

The First Spanish Republic came to an end during the fighting, when on 29 December 1874 the Bourbon Restoration restored the Spanish monarchy with Alfonso XII as king. On 9 February 1875, Alfonso XII appointed Sánchez Barcáiztegui as his aide-de-camp.

Sporadic fighting continued to occur in the Estuary of Bilbao, such as the Carlist capture of the fort at Axpe on 12 April 1875, which Buenaventura bombarded until the Carlist occupiers withdrew from it on 13 April. In April 1875, three newly completed Somorrostro-class gunboats — the Arlanza, Segura, and Turia — were assigned to serve under Sánchez Barcáiztegui on the Nervión River.

On 12 May 1875, Carlist troops who had been besieging Guetaria since 1873 began bombarding it with artillery positioned on Monte Gárate. The following day, Sánchez Barcáiztegui came to its aid with the corvettes África and Consuelo, the gunboat Segura, and the armed steamers Gaditano and Nieves. The ships conducted a heavy bombardment of the Carlist artillery batteries, but the siege continued.

=== Death and burial ===
On 26 May 1875, a Carlist artillery battery fired shots at Ferrolano while she was off Motrico, the shots apparently coming from somewhere between Guetaria and Motrico. Insisting on personally directing a reconnaissance mission to locate and silence the battery, Sánchez Barcáiztegui got underway from Guetaria at 10:30 aboard the armed paddle steamer Colón in company with other ships — described as África and Ferrolano by one source and as Ferrolano, Concordia, the paddle gunboat Fernando el Católico, and a ship identified as "Victoria" by another — to search the Motrico, Deva, and Zumbaya areas. Soon after they put to sea, a Carlist artillery round passed between Colón′s masts, doing no damage. When the ships were about half a nautical mile (0.6 mile; 0.9 km) off Deva, the Carlists fired another round, but again inflicted no damage. When Colón′s pilot, whom Sánchez Barcáiztegui held in high esteem, hinted to Sánchez Barcáiztegui that he was taking a serious risk by standing on Colón′s open bridge while under enemy fire so close to shore, Sánchez Barcáiztegui half-jokingly replied "Shut up, coward," then began to give an order that started with the word "Forward..." Before Sánchez Barcáiztegui could finish the order, a Carlist shell hit Colón and a piece of shrapnel from it struck him squarely in the chest, killing him instantly. The shell also wounded five other officers.

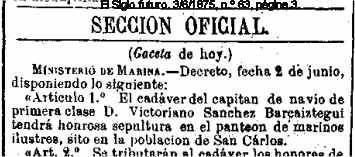
Official decree of 2 June 1875 regarding Sánchez Barcáiztegui's burial.

News of Sánchez Barcáiztegui's death spread quickly, and media outlets reported it as a momentous event. King Alfonso XII and the Government of Spain ordered that his body be embalmed and interred at the Panteón de Marinos Ilustres (Pantheon of Illustrious Mariners) in San Fernando, Spain. On 28 May 1875, the ships of his squadron and Spanish Army forces held a ceremony of mourning with all the honors corresponding to his rank, after which his remains were transported to San Sebastián. On 2 June, the Spanish government decreed that, although he was a capitán de navío (ship-of-the-line captain), he be granted the honors corresponding to the rank of a contralmirante (counter admiral) who died in the line of duty, and therefore his remains were embarked on the flagship itself, Colón, and transferred to the Cádiz Naval Department and from there to the Arsenal de La Carraca in San Fernando.

Sánchez Barcáiztegui was buried in the Pantheon of Illustrious Sailors on either 14 or 15 June 1875, according to different sources. The following day, a solemn requiem mass was celebrated, and the Spanish government ordered that an inscription summarizing his services to the nation be placed there. The inscription reads:

Here lies Mr. Victoriano Sánchez Barcaiztegui, Ship-of-the-Line Captain First Class, Commander General of the naval forces on the coasts of Cantabria. Born April 23, 1826, he distinguished himself from the beginning of his career. He made his name illustrious commanding the Almansa in the Battle of Callao. Flying his flag of command aboard the steamship Colón, he died gloriously off the coast of Motrico, struck down by an enemy shell on May 26, 1875. R.I.P.

Don Victoriano Sánchez Barcáiztegui, for his bravery, chivalry, professional knowledge, and gentle character, which he rarely combined with such great energy, was loved by all who knew him, and his memory constitutes a glory of the Royal Spanish Navy.

== Personal life ==
Sánchez Barcáiztegui married Aurora de Ambrosí Luchi in 1851. She died in childbirth, and their only son died shortly afterward. In 1870 he married Ana Acquaroni Solís, with whom he had four children (Victoriano, Lucía, Fermín, and Tomás). His second wife survived him.

== Honors and awards ==
=== Kingdom of Spain ===
- Royal Navy Diadem Cross of Distinction (two awards)
- Laureate Cross of Saint Ferdinand First Class
- Commander of the Order of Charles III
- Cross of the Order of Isabella the Catholic
- Cross of Naval Merit with Red Decoration
- Cross of the Royal and Military Order of Saint Hermenegild

=== Foreign ===
- Knight Commander of the Order of St. Gregory the Great (Holy See)
- Knight of the Order of Pope Pius IX (Holy See)
- Knight Grand Cross of the Royal Order of Francis I (Kingdom of the Two Sicilies)>

== Commemoration ==
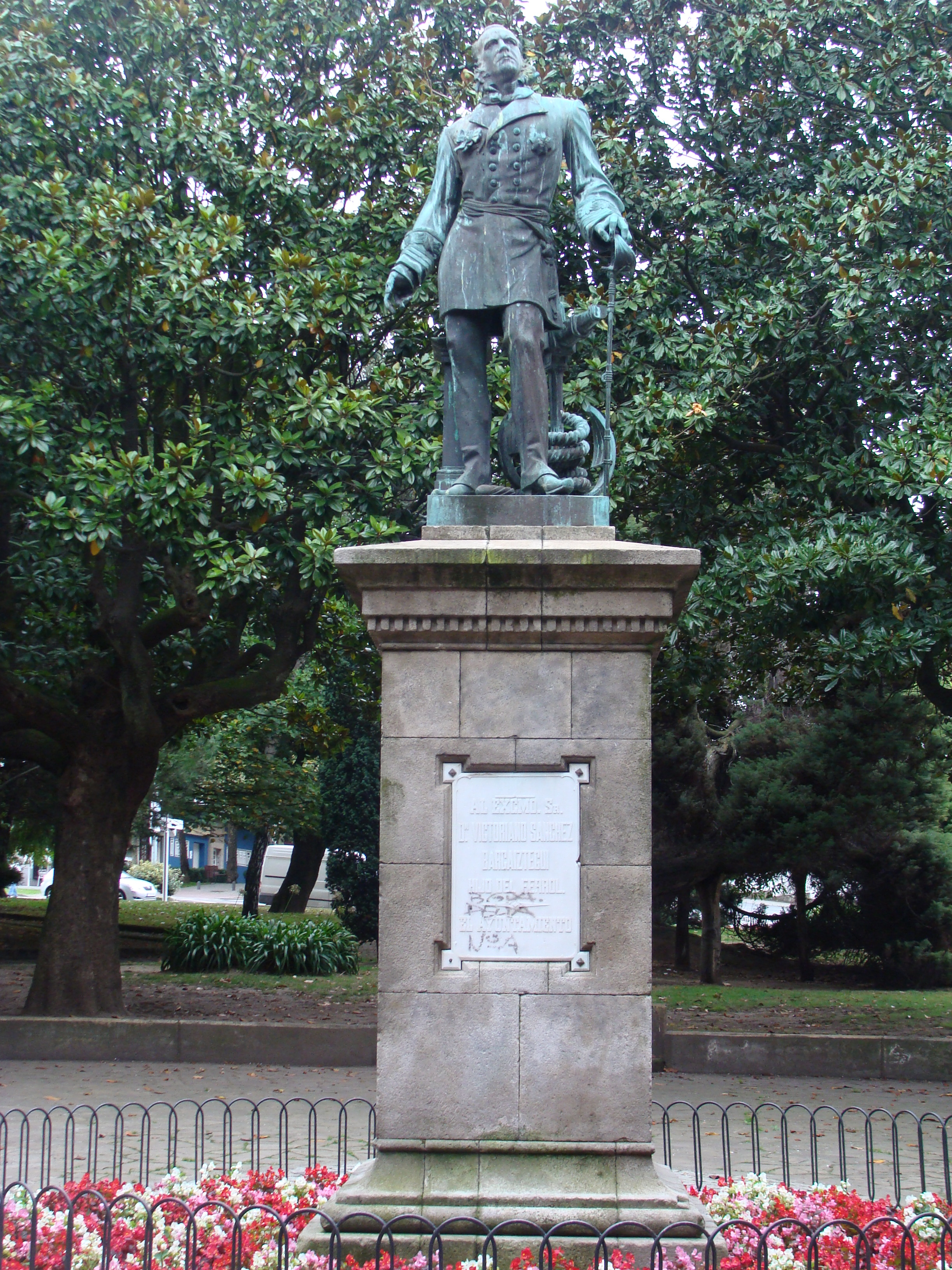
A statue of Victoriano Sánchez Barcáiztegui by the sculptor Ponciano Ponzano in Ferrol, Spain

On 5 June 1875, the Ferrol City Council, approved a motion presented by the city's mayor which stated, "On the 26th of May, off the Deva and Motrico batteries, Mr. Victoriano Sánchez Barcáiztegui, Captain of the Navy and Commander-in-Chief of the Northern Naval Forces, died gloriously...This town, which has always seen its own glories in the glories of the Navy, as demonstrated by the Churruca obelisk, the statue of Jorge Juan, and the names of the streets Gravina, Galiano, and Méndez Núñez, cannot forget the Ferrol native Sánchez Barcáiztegui, a worthy successor to those illustrious mariners...First: it will be agreed that his statue be erected in a promenade or square of this town...” The City Council unanimously approved the motion, which the city of Ferrol communicated to the captain general of the Ferrol Maritime Department. During a brief visit to Ferrol in the summer of 1881, King Alfonso XII and Queen Maria Cristina unveiled the statue in the Canton of Molíns, and Alfonso XII praised Sánchez Barcáiztegui and expressed the hope that his example would serve as an inspiration to Spanish patriots, concluding the ceremony by saying, "Perhaps I was the last to shake his hand upon leaving Madrid, never to return."

Two Spanish Navy ships have borne Sánchez Barcáiztegui's name. The first, the Jorge Juan-class screw sloop-of-war Sánchez Barcáiztegui — which the Spanish Navy classified at various times as an aviso, second-class cruiser, and third-class cruiser — was commissioned in 1877 and sunk in a collision in 1895. The second was the Churruca-class destroyer Sánchez Barcáiztegui, which was commissioned in 1928, participated in the Spanish Civil War (1936–1939) as part of the Spanish Republican Navy, and then served in the Spanish Navy until 1964.

Sánchez Barcáiztegui has a street named after him in the Pacífico neighborhood of Madrid and another in the Magdalena neighborhood of Ferrol. A street in the Sampaloc neighborhood of Manila in the Philippines is named Calle Sánchez Barcáiztegui (Sanchez Barcaiztegui Street).
