= Action of 22 August 1866 =

- Part of the Chincha Islands War
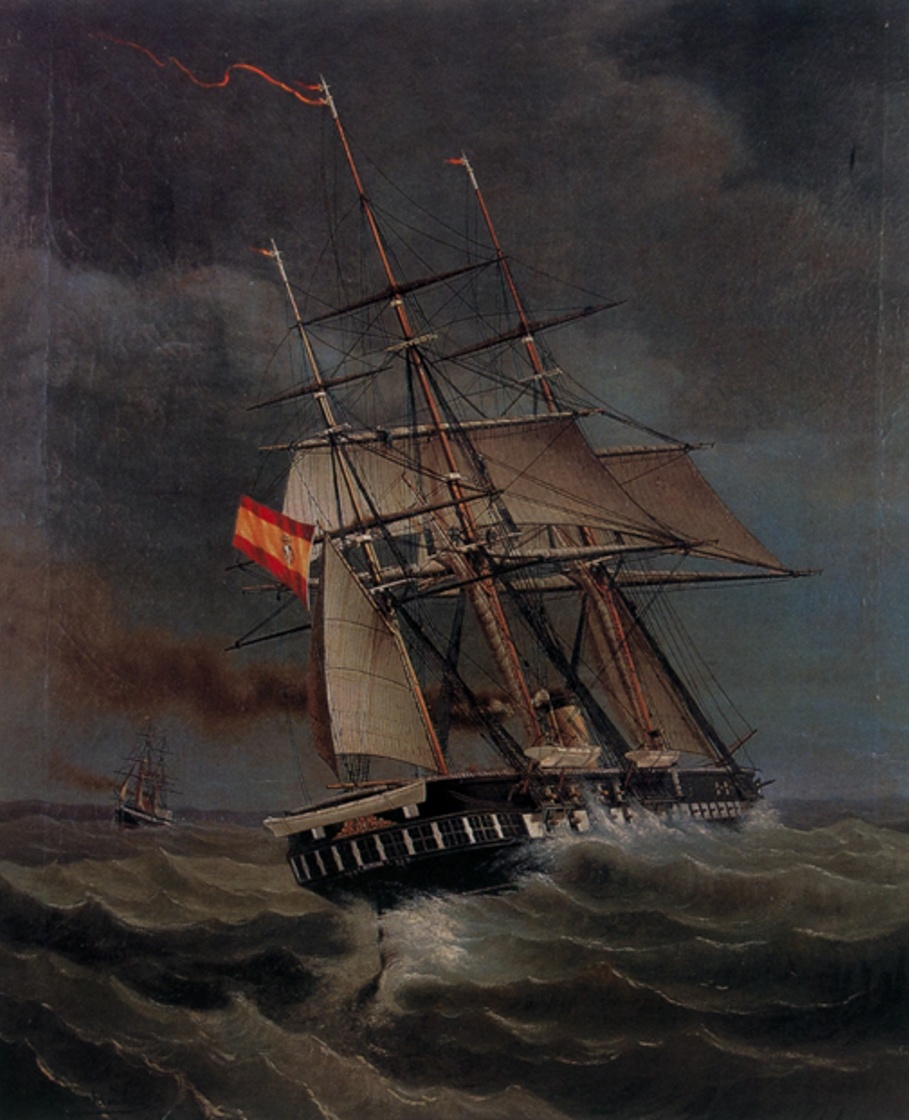
- Painting of Gerona chasing Tornado
Date	22 August 1866
Location	Off Funchal, Madeira 32°55′2″N 17°15′19″W
Result	Spanish victory

Belligerents
Spain	Chile

Commanders and leaders
Benito Ruiz de la Escalera	John McPherson (POW)

Strength
1 screw frigate	1 screw corvette

Casualties and losses
None	60 captured 1 screw corvette captured

The action of 22 August 1866 occurred during the Chincha Islands War off the island of Madeira, and was the final engagement of the war. It was fought between the Spanish Navy frigate Gerona and Tornado, a British-registered screw corvette in Chilean service. Gerona had been sent from Cádiz with orders to capture Tornado and her sister ship Cyclone, spotting the former off Madeira and capturing her bloodlessly after firing five shots. The corvette and her 60-man crew were taken prisoner, which triggered a diplomatic incident between the Spanish and British governments. Tornado was commissioned into the Spanish navy, and saw service during the Ten Years' War.

== Background ==
During the Chincha Islands War between Spain and several South American countries, Chilean authorities sent agents to European shipyards to acquire unsold warships originally laid down for the Confederate navy. The agents purchased the screw corvettes Tornado and Cyclone; the former ship set sail from Leith for Chile on 19 August 1866. When she set sail, Tornado was still British-registered, manned by a British crew and flew the Red Ensign, and as the ship was bound for a neutral destination, there were no Chileans aboard.

She had not been fully fitted out as a warship as Tornado was intended to rendezvous with Greathem Hall, a British supply ship in Chilean service, but this was thwarted by the Royal Navy frigate HMS Caledonia, which had seized Greathem Hall on 11 July off the Isle of Portland. By then, Tornado had set sail from Hamburg for London on 10 July. She had eventually arrived in Leith on 4 August, and Spanish diplomats notified British authorities that the vessel was loading rifles and its crew was possibly being hired by either Peru or Chile for service against Spain.

Once Tornado reached the rendezvous point, her captain John McPherson waited for Greathem Hall before setting sail for Fernando de Noronha in order to collect unpaid wages and bonuses offered for the delivery of the vessel. Meanwhile, Gerona, a screw frigate of the Spanish Navy, had received orders to capture both Tornado and Cyclone. The Spanish ship set sail from Cádiz on the morning of 20 August and arrived at the island of Madeira on 22 August. Tornado had in the meantime taken on five Portuguese sailors at Funchal, Madeira to augment her original 55-man crew.

== Action ==
Having arrived at Funchal on 21 August to take on charcoal, food and extra sailors, McPherson originally planned for Tornado to stay in port until 23 August. However, at 14:00 hours on 22 August the ship's watch alerted him to the presence of Gerona, and McPherson decided to leave all unloaded supplies on the dock and got his ship underway 90 minutes after the Spanish vessel was first sighted. In her haste to leave, Tornado was not inspected or granted permission to leave port by Portuguese authorities in Madeira, who fired two blank warning shots to signal the leaving vessel to stop. However, Tornado continued out of port, hugging the coast northward.

Gerona was alerted to Tornado's departure by lamp signals from a Spanish brigantine moored at Funchal, and the screw frigate's commander, Captain Benito Ruiz de la Escalera, ordered his crew to chase the fleeing ship. At 22:30, 4 nautical miles (7.4 km; 4.6 mi) off Cape Tristao, Gerona fired a blank warning shot at Tornado, which ignored it and continued sailing. In response, the Spanish warship fired four live shots at Tornado, which led McPherson to order his ship's engines to be stopped and her colours to be struck.

== Aftermath ==
The Spanish transferred the crew of Tornado to Gerona, and the captured vessel was manned by a prize crew commanded by Lieutenant Manuel de Bustillo y Pery. Tornado set sail for Cádiz, where she arrived on 26 August, while Gerona returned to Madeira in a fruitless search for Cyclone. Following news of the engagement reaching Britain, it triggered a diplomatic incident between the Spanish and British governments, with the latter arguing that Gerona had no right to attack or capture Tornado and further protesting Spain's harsh treatment of the captured sailors, which included designating them as prisoners of war and chaining them up. However, both governments (at the consular level) eventually agreed that Tornado was, by its construction and equipment, "a man-of-war, or rather a privateer". The captured steamer was condemned by a Spanish admiralty court at Cádiz as a seaworthy prize and Tornado was subsequently commissioned into the Spanish Navy service under the same name. She saw service during the Ten Years' War, triggering another diplomatic incident in 1873 which became known as the Virginius Affair.
