= Spanish frigate Gerona =

Spanish Navy screw frigate of 1865–1899

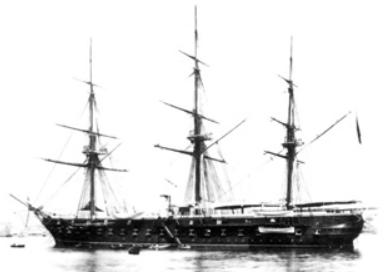

History

Armada Española Ensign First Spanish Republic
- Name: Gerona
- Namesake: Girona, Spain
- Ordered: 4 July 1861
- Builder: Arsenal de Cartagena, Cartagena, Spain
- Cost: 3,664,243.23 pesetas
- Laid down: 21 October 1861
- Launched: 22 March 1864
- Completed: 1865
- Commissioned: May 1865
- Decommissioned: January 1899
- Fate: Hulked 1895; Sold 1901; Scrapped

General characteristics
- Type: Screw frigate
- Displacement: 3,980 t (3,920 long tons)
- Length: 81 m (265 ft 9 in)
- Beam: 15.4 m (50 ft 6 in)
- Height: 7.41 m (24 ft 4 in)
- Draft: 6.33 m (20 ft 9 in)
- Installed power: 600 hp (447 kW) (nominal)
- Propulsion: Two steam engines; 650 tons coal
- Sail plan: Ship-rigged
- Speed: 9 to 12 knots (17 to 22 km/h; 10 to 14 mph)
- Complement: 549 to 600
- Armament: As built: 34 x 68-pounder (31 kg) 200 mm (7.9 in) smoothbore guns; 8 x 32-pounder (14.5 kg) 160 mm (6.3 in) rifled guns; 6 x 32-pounder (14.5 kg) 160 mm (6.3 in) smoothbore guns; 6 x bronze guns (for use in boats); 1870: 32 x 68-pounder (31 kg) 200 mm (7.9 in) smoothbore guns; 14 x 160 mm (6.3 in) rifled guns; 1883: 17 x 160 mm (6.3 in) cased guns; 2 x 160 mm (6.3 in) Hontoria guns; 2 x 150 mm (5.9 in) Armstrong guns; 2 x 150 mm (5.9 in) Krupp guns; 4 x 90 mm (3.5 in) Hontoria guns; 2 x 70 mm (2.8 in) Hontoria guns; 3 x machine guns; 1891: 16 x 160 mm (6.3 in) Palliser guns; 6 x Hontoria 90 mm (3.5 in) and 70 mm (2.8 in) guns; 1 x 37 mm (1.5 in) Hotchkiss gun; 2 x 25 mm (1 in) Nordenfelt machine guns; 1896: 6 x Hontoria guns; 2 x machine guns

Gerona was a Spanish Navy screw frigate in commission from 1865 to 1899. She took part in combat operations during the Chincha Islands War, the Ten Years' War, and the First Melillan Campaign. She was named for Girona, a city in Catalonia in northeastern Spain.

== Characteristics ==
Gerona was a screw frigate with a wooden hull and a ship rig. She had three masts and a bowsprit. She displaced 3,980 tons. She was 81 metres (265 ft 9 in) long and was 15.4 metres (50 ft 6 in) in beam, 7.41 metres (24 ft 4 in) in height, and 6.33 metres (20 ft 9 in) in draft. She had two steam engines rated at a nominal 600 horsepower (447 kW). She could reach a maximum speed of 9 to 12 knots (17 to 22 km/h; 10 to 14 mph). She could carry up to 650 tons of coal. Her armament consisted of thirty-four 68-pounder (31 kg) 200-millimetre (7.9 in) smoothbore guns, six 32-pounder (14.5 kg) 160-millimetre (6.3 in) smoothbore guns, eight 32-pounder (14.5 kg) 160-millimetre (6.3 in) rifled guns, and six bronze guns for disembarkation and use in her boats. She had a crew of 549 to 600 men.

== Construction and commissioning ==
Gerona was ordered on 4 July 1861 and her keel was laid at the Arsenal de Cartagena in Cartagena, Spain, on 21 October 1861. She was launched on 22 March 1864, and was completed in 1865. She was commissioned in May 1865. Her construction cost was 3,664,243.23 pesetas.

== Service history ==
=== Chincha Islands War ===
Gerona was commissioned amidst tensions in the southeastern Pacific Ocean between Spain, Chile, and Peru. She received orders to proceed to Cádiz, Spain, where the Spanish Navy was forming a division composed of Gerona and the screw frigates Navas de Tolosa and Princesa de Asturias, and make ready for wartime operations. The Chincha Islands War broke out between Spain and Chile in September 1865, and Bolivia, Ecuador, and Peru also had declared war on Spain by the time the last ship, Navas de Tolosa, commissioned in March 1866, had arrived at Cádiz to join the division. The division remained in Spain and was assigned to operations in the Atlantic Ocean, patrolling to intercept any enemy ships that attempted to raid Spanish shipping lanes or make delivery voyages from Europe to South America.

With orders from the Spanish government to capture two Peruvian ironclad warships, Independencia and Huáscar, as they made their delivery voyages from France to South America, and the Chilean screw corvettes Cyclone and Tornado as they attempted to make their delivery voyages from the United Kingdom to South America, Gerona departed from Cádiz early on the morning of 20 August 1866, arriving off Madeira, near Funchal, Portugal, on 22 August. As she approached the anchorage at 18:15, she sighted a suspicious steamer weighing anchor and apparently getting ready to put to sea. Gerona′s commanding officer, Capitán de navío (Ship-of-the-Line Captain) Benito Ruiz de la Escalera, decided to approach the steamer to obtain news from her and to follow her if she turned out to be Cyclone or Tornado.

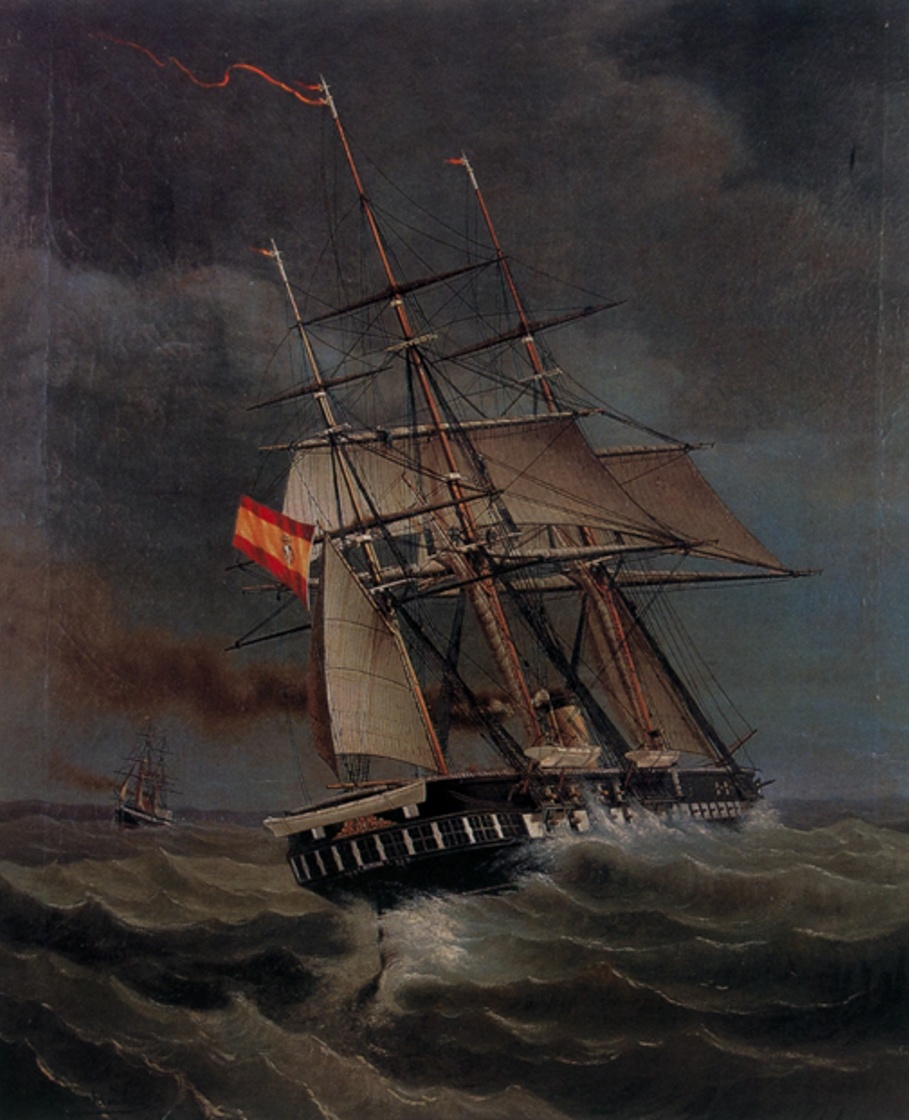
Capture of the screw corvette Tornado by the screw frigate Gerona. (1881 painting by Ángel Cortellini Sánchez)

At 20:00, the steamer appeared to be getting underway, and Gerona set off in pursuit. The steamer took a suspicious route, first keeping as close as possible to the northwest coast of Madeira as far as Ponta do Tristão, where she steered northward toward the open sea. In the ensuing action of 22 August 1866, the steamer was faster than Gerona, but Ruiz de la Escalera ordered Gerona′s chief engineer, an Englishman who was on board because her two steam engines were under warranty, to push her engines to their maximum. When the chief engineer replied that he could not do the impossible, the commanding officer replaced him with the second engineer, who forced the engines to their limits. This allowed Gerona to get close enough to fire warning shots. At 20:30, at a distance of more than 4 nautical miles (7.4 km; 4.6 mi) from the coast, Gerona fired a blank at the steamer. The steamer maintained her course and speed, so Gerona fired four more warning shots, and the steamer stopped.

Gerona sent a boarding party to the steamer in two of her boats and determined that she was Tornado, registered in the United Kingdom, flying the British flag, with a British captain named John MacPherson, and with no Chileans aboard. Tornado was unarmed, although the great amount of coal she had aboard made it impossible for the boarding party to ascertain what, if any, munitions were aboard. MacPherson was brought aboard Gerona, where he displayed an insolent attitude and answered questions in an insulting way, prompting Ruiz de la Escalera to upbraid him. Returning MacPherson to Tornado, Gerona took Tornado as a prize and brought her 55-man crew aboard Gerona. A prize crew of 57 men from Gerona took Tornado to Cádiz. Tornado later entered service with the Spanish Navy under the same name.

Gerona searched for Cyclone without success before returning to Cádiz. MacPherson and his crew were placed in chains and treated with great severity both aboard Gerona and after their disembarkation at Cádiz. During subsequent negotiations between the British and Spanish governments, British representatives expressed the opinion that the Spanish government had no right to treat the crew as prisoners of war, much less place them in chains.

=== 1868–1882 ===
After the conclusion of the Chincha Islands War, Gerona began a tour of duty with the Mediterranean Squadron under the overall command of Contralmiramte (Counter Admiral) Juan Bautista Antequera y Bobadilla. In September 1868, the Glorious Revolution against the rule of Queen Isabella II broke out in Spain and Antequera received orders to take his squadron from Cartagena to Cádiz to support Teniente general (Lieutenant General) Antonio Caballero y Fernández de Rodas, whose forces were fighting against the rebels. The revolution quickly resulted in the deposition of Isabella II and the formation of a provisional government.

The Mediterranean Squadron anchored off Málaga on 1 January 1869 to quell a revolt that broke out there. After the uprising was put down, it returned to Cartagena. It got back underway on 30 January 1869 and proceeded to Santa Pola, where it remained for about three months while politicians discussed a new constitution. In 1870, Gerona underwent changes to her armament which left her with thirty-two 200-millimetre (7.9 in) smoothbore guns and fourteen 160-millimetre (6.3 in) rifled guns, eight of which were on her quarterdeck and six on her forecastle.

Meanwhile, the Ten Years' War broke out in the Captaincy General of Cuba in 1868, pitting Spanish forces against insurgents of the Cuban Liberation Army. Gerona deployed to Cuba and, based at Havana, participated in several operations. In 1870, she took part in an amphibious landing at the Bay of Pigs and the Zapata Swamp. She was the flagship of Contralmiramte (Counter Admiral) Manuel de la Rigada when the Austro-Hungarian Navy screw corvette SMS Helgoland arrived at Havana in April 1873 during a training cruise and she exchanged gun salutes with Helgoland. She returned to Cartagena in 1877.

As part of the Training Squadron, Gerona participated in maneuvers off Galicia on 9 August 1881 presided over by King Alfonso XII and Queen Maria Christina. On 13 August the king and queen embarked on the armoured frigate Sagunto to head for La Coruña escorted by the rest of the squadron. The ships called at Villagarcía de Arosa from 15 to 18 August and reached Vigo on 19 August. The king and queen embarked on the gunboat Pelícano, and the squadron arrived at Bayonne in southwestern France on 25 August. The squadron continued to escort the king and queen as they visited the Galician estuaries and was present at the laying of the keel of the unprotected cruiser Reina Cristina at Ferrol, Spain, on 12 August 1881.

=== 1883–1901 ===
After leaving the Training Squadron, Gerona underwent a major reconstruction in 1883, from which she emerged with seventeen 160-millimetre (6.3 in) cased guns, two 160-millimetre (6.3 in) Hontoria guns, two 150-millimetre (5.9 in) Armstrong guns, two 150-millimetre (5.9 in) Krupp guns, four 90-millimetre (3.5 in) Hontoria guns, two 70-millimetre (2.8 in) Hontoria guns, and three machine guns. She also received new boilers manufactured in Cartagena which did not deliver their expected performance. She became a gunnery training ship in 1883, replacing the screw frigate Villa de Madrid in that role.

At the beginning of 1885, Gerona took on an additional role as a cadet training ship, replacing the screw frigate Lealtad, while continuing to operate as a gunnery training ship. At the beginning of September 1885, she began a tour of duty with the Training Squadron. Amid tensions with the German Empire over control of the Caroline Islands in the Spanish East Indies, the squadron assembled at Mahón on Menorca in the Balearic Islands on 18 March 1886 with orders to prepare to steam to the Pacific Ocean to defend the Carolines, as well to prepare to defend the Balearics in case Germany tried to seize them as a bargaining chip in peace talks. In the end, no conflict broke out between Spain and Germany.

In mid-January 1887 the Training Squadron, consisting of Gerona, the armoured frigate Numancia (serving as the squadron's flagship), and the unprotected cruiser Castilla, made a cruise in the Mediterranean Sea, during which the ships visited several ports. The ships called at Genoa, Italy, from 24 January to 2 February 1887, then departed bound for La Spezia. Scheduled visits to ports in Sicily were canceled when cholera broke out in Catania, but the squadron visited Algiers and other ports in North Africa before concluding the cruise.

Gerona was among Spanish Navy ships at Barcelona on 20 May 1888 for the opening of the 1888 Barcelona Universal Exposition. In 1889, she began another assignment with the Training Squadron, serving as its flagship. The squadron departed Cádiz in September 1889 and anchored at Tangier, where it rendezvoused with a number of other Spanish warships to make several claims against the sultan of Morocco after Moroccan attacks on Spanish ships and citizens.

In 1891, Gerona′s armament again underwent modification, leaving her with sixteen 160-millimetre (6.3 in) Palliser guns, six Hontoria 90-millimetre (3.5 in) and 70-millimetre (2.8 in) guns, a 37-millimetre (1.5 in) Hotchkiss gun, and two 25-millimetre (1 in) Nordenfelt machine guns. During the First Melillan Campaign of 1893–1894 she made several deployments to the coast of North Africa with a Spanish Navy squadron and transported troops and materiel from Málaga to Melilla several times.

In 1895 Gerona was hulked as a floating jetty and depot ship for sailors at Cádiz. Her armament was reduced to six Hontoria guns and two machine guns in 1896. She was decommissioned in January 1899 and sold in 1901 for scrapping.
