= Chilean corvette Abtao =

Ship launched in 1863

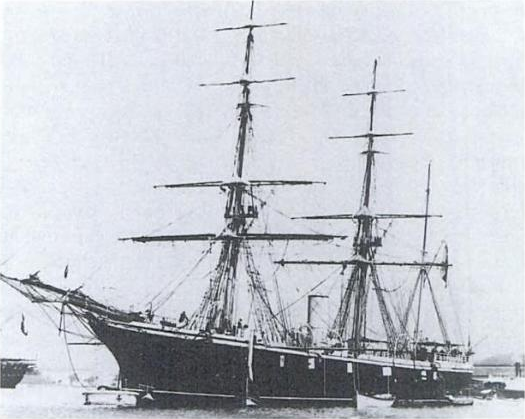
- Chilean corvette Abtao

History

Chile
- Name: Abtao
- Namesake: Battle of Abtao
- Ordered: by the Confederate States Navy
- Builder: Dennis Brothers, Scotland
- Launched: 29 October 1863
- Commissioned: 1 June 1867
- Decommissioned: 1922
- Renamed: ex Texas, Cyclone
- Honours and awards: Naval Campaign of the War of the Pacific

General characteristics
- Displacement: 1,600 t
- Length: 211 ft 6 in (64.47 m)
- Beam: 12.7 m (42 ft)
- Draft: 8 ft (2.4 m)
- Installed power: 800 ihp (600 kW)
- Speed: 10 knots (19 km/h; 12 mph)
- Crew: 200
- Armament: 1 × 5.8" and 4 × 4.7" guns

The corvette Abtao was a wooden ship built in Scotland during 1864 of 1,600 tons and 800 IHP. She fought in the War of the Pacific and was in service for the Chilean Navy until 1922.

== Two hulls in Glasgow ==
During the Chincha Islands War, the Chilean Government sent her agent in Belgium Manuel Carvallo to British shipyards in search of unsold warships originally laid down for the Confederate States Navy; he found in Glasgow and Greenock, on the River Clyde, the hulls of the 1600-ton commerce-raider Texas (not the ironclad CSS Texas) and the 1200-ton Pampero. In order to conceal the true owner of the ship and to elude the Foreign Enlistment Act, several names were used for the ships. Both ships used the name Pampero but the 1600-ton Texas was also named Cyclone and finally Abtao and the 1200-ton true original Pampero was also named Canton and finally Tornado under Spanish command.

The 1600-ton hull was christened Pampero by a Mrs. Galbraith and launched on 29 October 1863. Through the efforts of the American consul in Glasgow, Warner Underwood, she was placed under a 24-hour scrutiny by British customs officers and as late as January 1865 she was still considered to be Confederate property, and apparently remained so until the end of the American Civil War. She was purchased by Chile for £75,000 through Isaac Campbell & Co.in January or February 1866.

Robert Winthrop Simpson on behalf of the Chilean Government ordered both ships, Pampero and Texas to be manned in Hamburg and later to the Faroe Islands.

Texas arrived at Valparaíso in November 1866 and was rechristened Abtao after the Naval Battle of Abtao.

== Fate of Pampero ==
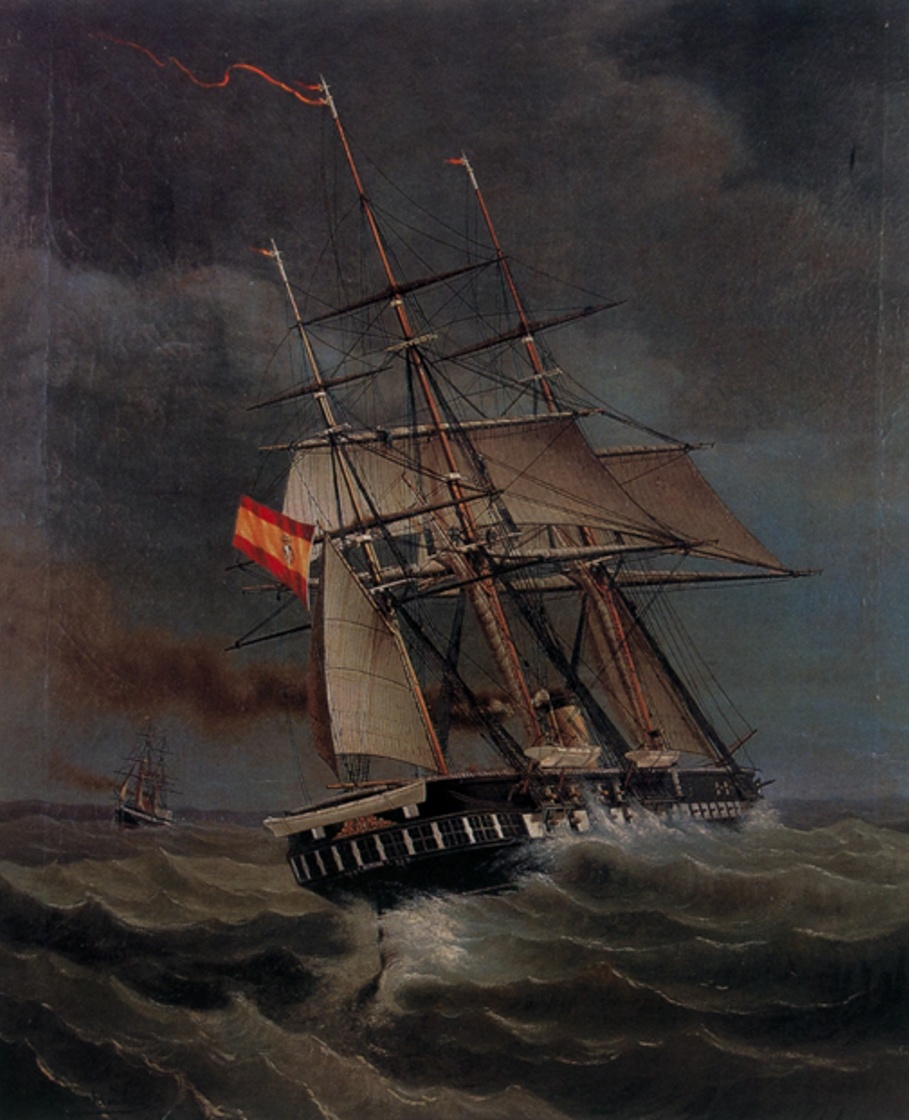
The Spanish frigate Gerona captures the Chilean ship Pampero

But the Pampero (later the Spanish corvette Tornado) should have been in rendezvous with the British filibustering ship steamer Greathem Hall, aiming to interfere against the Spanish trade, as planned by the Chilean Government. But the later was captured by the armoured frigate HMS Caledonia and taken into Portland. Pampero waited patiently in the rendezvous point, until the crew were ordered to re-coal and head for the desolate islands of Fernando de Noronha, an old pirate haunt off the Brazilian coast, in order to collect unpaid wages and bonuses offered by the delivery of the vessel.

The Spanish frigate Gerona, brought strict orders from the Spanish government to capture the Chilean ships and the Peruvian Independencia and Huáscar. The Peruvian vessels made it to Latin American waters but the Chilean Pampero was about to be captured. Gerona sailed from Cádiz early on the morning of 20 August 1866, arriving at Madeira, Portugal, on 22 August. At 18:15; before arriving at the anchoring ground, she discovered a suspicious steamer weighing anchor and apparently getting ready to put to sea, for which reason the Commander of Gerona, Don Benito Escalera, thought fit to proceed towards her to see if he could obtains news, and to be at the same time in readiness to follow in her track, should she turn out to be either of the vessels indicated to him by the Spanish government.

== Career of Abtao ==
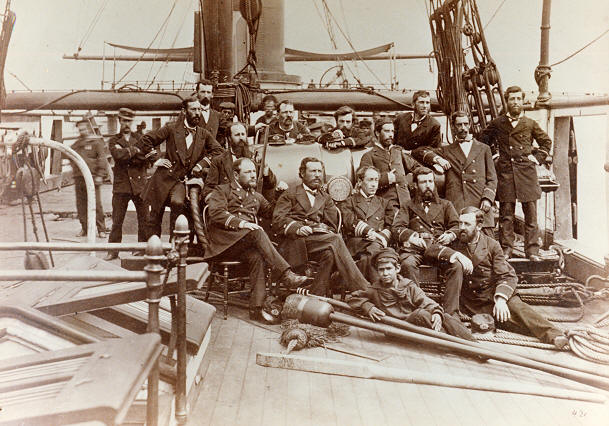
Officers of Abtao during the War of the Pacific

Abtao was commissioned on 1 June 1867, after the Chinchas war, under the command of Capitán de Fragata Enrique Simpson Baeza later was she under command of Galvarino Riveros Cárdenas and 1868 she brought help to Arica after the 1868 Arica earthquake.

Under Capitan de Corbeta Francisco Rondizzoni de la Cotera she made a hydrographic survey of the Chilean coast between Mataquito River and the Tumán Bay.

On 12 February 1873 she was put under the command of Capitán de Corbeta Jorge Montt Alvarez and she sail to the Strait of Magellan to a hydrographic survey as she did up 1876 between the Parallel 23°S and the Caleta del Cobre.

According to Oscar Bermudez Miral, the corvette Abtao set sail under the command of Commander F. Rondizzoni, member of the Northern Atacama Coastal Exploration Committee, tasked with making studies as proposed by Minister Victorio Lastarria. Also aboard the steamship Abtao were the engineers Eugenio Plazolles and Macario Sierralta who were under government orders to do reconnaissance work along the northern Atacama coast. They set sail on 21 October 1876 from Mejillones, arriving the next night at Antofagasta. There, the engineers Sierralta and Plazolles chose the elderly miner Secundino Corvalan, who was familiar with the area, to help them reach the interior of the desert in the area between the 24th parallel and Caleta el Cobre, some 15 or 16 nautical miles south of that parallel.

According to Bermudez, as the corvette Abtao continued further south of Caleta el Cobre, the members of the expedition observed that the mountain range was further and further from the coast and, in its place, a wide plane appeared. In front of the expedition was Caleta de Remiendos and the ravine of the same name. The members of the expedition had located the conditions necessary for the establishment of a port, as well as an overland means of communication with the desert interior.

1877 Abtao could not be sold and was used as transporter until 1878 when she was sold for $18,000.

At the beginning of the War of the Pacific she was bought by the Chilean Government for $25,000 and armed with four 150 lb and four 40 lb guns and set sail for Callao with the Chilean Fleet as planned by Almirante Juan Williams Rebolledo.

On 28 August 1879 she fought off Antofagasta together with Magallanes against Huáscar.

She was involved in almost all Chilean expeditions and landings during the war. In the final stages of the war she was refitted completely.

At the beginning of the 1891 Chilean Civil War she sailed out of Valparaíso harbour and adhered to the cause of the Congress.

== See also ==
- List of decommissioned ships of the Chilean Navy
