= Seixal (Porto Moniz) =

- Civil parish
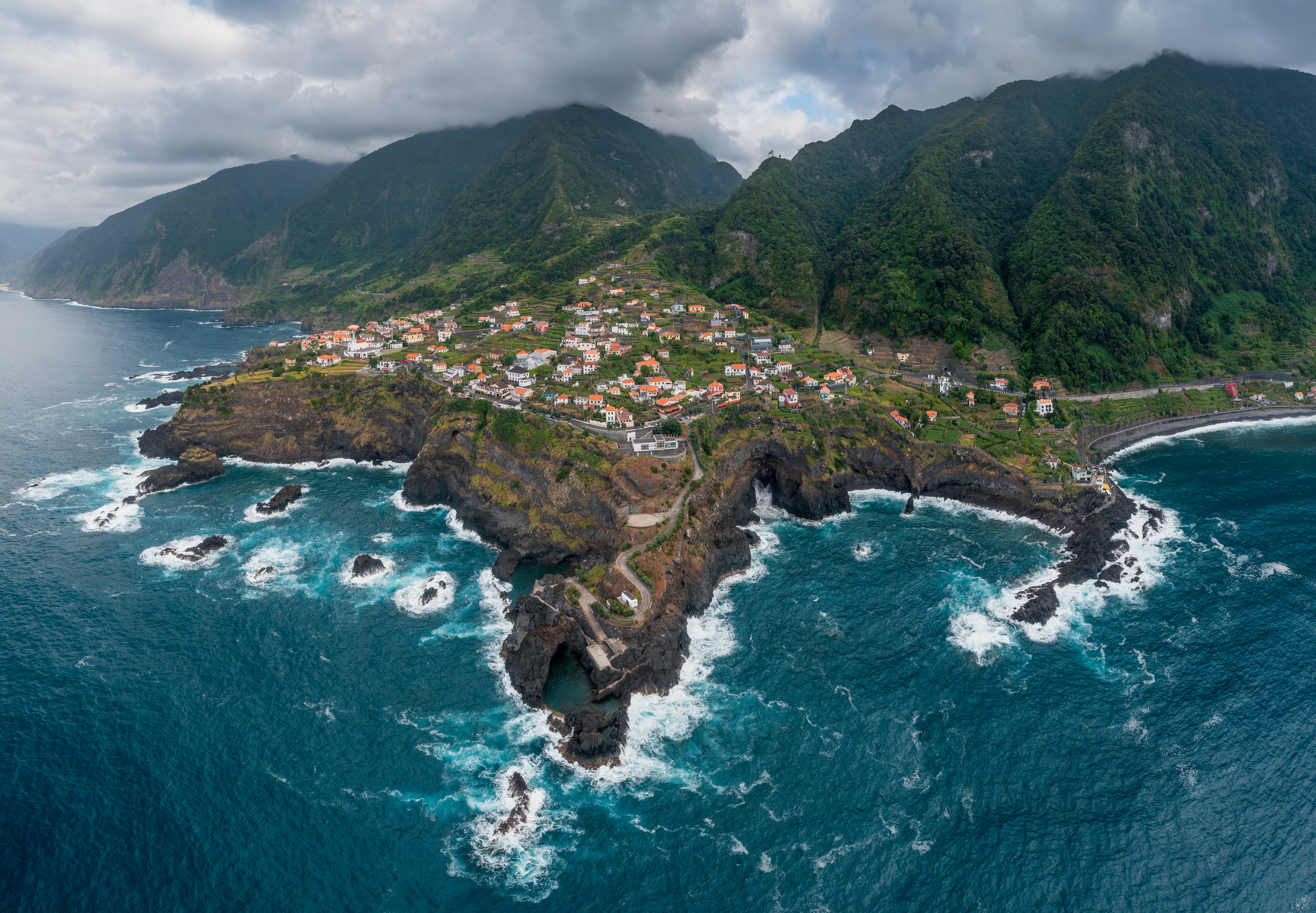
- The seaside village of Seixal

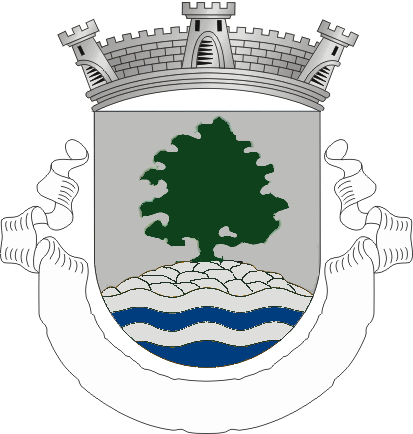
- Coat of arms

- Location in Madeira
- Coordinates: 32°48′17″N 17°6′37″W
- Country: Portugal
- Auton. region: Madeira
- Island: Madeira
- Municipality: Porto Moniz

Area
  - Total: 36.37 km^{2} (14.04 sq mi)
- Elevation: 598 m (1,962 ft)

Population (2011)
  - Total: 656
  - Density: 18.0/km^{2} (46.7/sq mi)
- Time zone: UTC+00:00 (WET)
  - Summer (DST): UTC+01:00 (WEST)
- Postal code: 9270-124
- Area code: 291
- Patron: Santo Antão
- Website: www.freguesiaseixal.pt

Seixal is a civil parish in the municipality of Porto Moniz in the Portuguese island of Madeira. The population in 2011 was 656, in an area of 36.37 km^{2}.

== History ==
Much like its continental twin, Seixal's name origin came from the abundance of pebbles on the beach.

== Geography ==
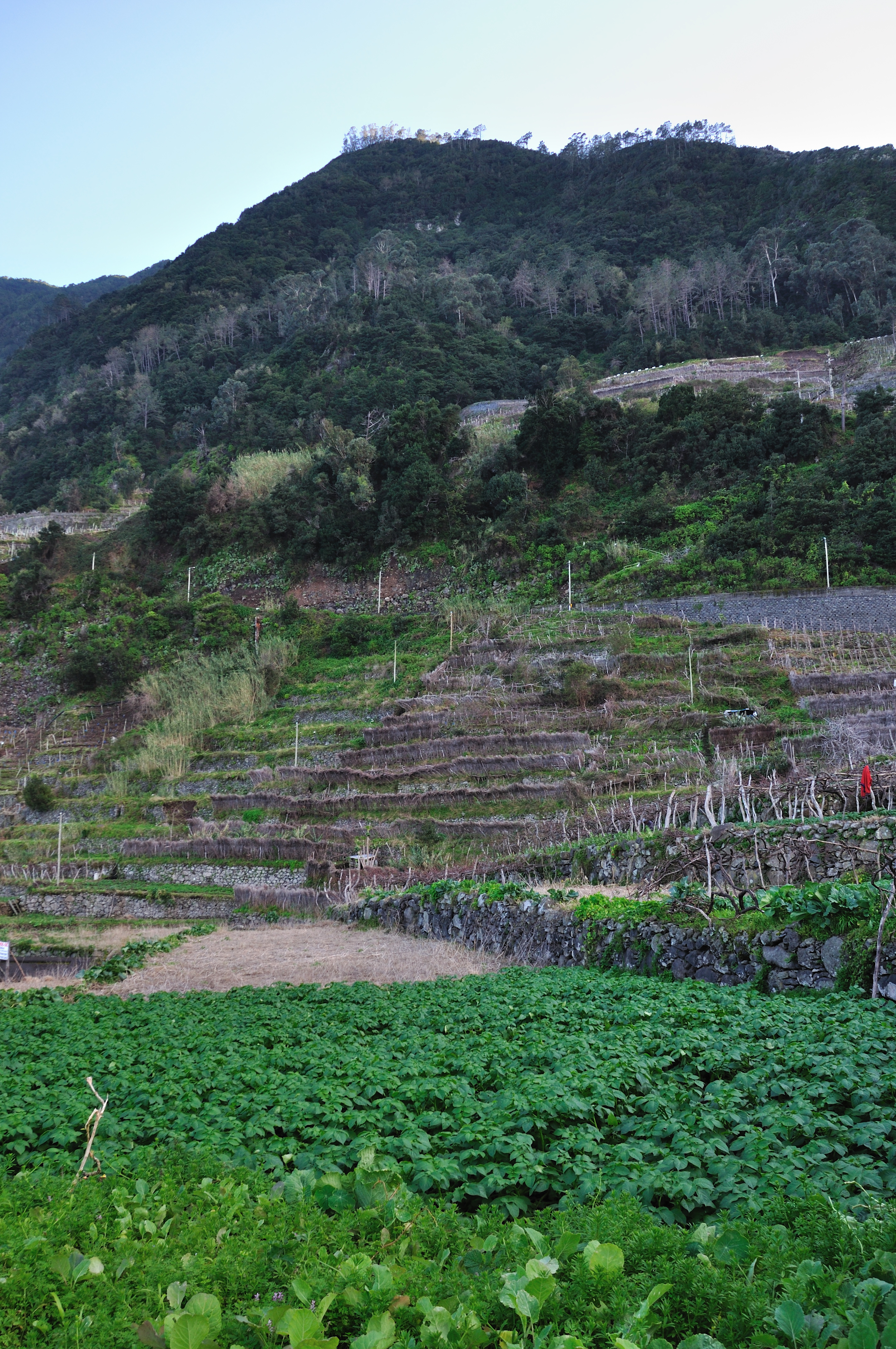
Agricultural fields along the slopes of Seixal

It is located on the eastern frontier of Porto Moniz on the border with the municipality of São Vicente. The largest parish in Porto Moniz by area, it extends from the Atlantic Ocean into the interior of Paul de Serra.

== Climate ==
Seixal has a subtropical Mediterranean climate (Köppen climate classification: Csa).

Climate data for Seixal, 2021–2023, altitude: 112 m (367 ft)
Month	Jan	Feb	Mar	Apr	May	Jun	Jul	Aug	Sep	Oct	Nov	Dec	Year
Record high °C (°F)	24.5 (76.1)	26.0 (78.8)	26.9 (80.4)	29.1 (84.4)	30.4 (86.7)	32.0 (89.6)	33.5 (92.3)	33.9 (93.0)	33.2 (91.8)	33.8 (92.8)	27.5 (81.5)	25.1 (77.2)	33.9 (93.0)
Mean daily maximum °C (°F)	19.2 (66.6)	19.7 (67.5)	20.4 (68.7)	22.9 (73.2)	24.6 (76.3)	26.2 (79.2)	28.1 (82.6)	28.9 (84.0)	28.2 (82.8)	26.6 (79.9)	23.5 (74.3)	20.8 (69.4)	24.1 (75.4)
Daily mean °C (°F)	15.2 (59.4)	15.0 (59.0)	16.0 (60.8)	17.0 (62.6)	18.6 (65.5)	20.0 (68.0)	21.7 (71.1)	22.5 (72.5)	22.0 (71.6)	21.0 (69.8)	18.1 (64.6)	16.3 (61.3)	18.6 (65.5)
Mean daily minimum °C (°F)	12.7 (54.9)	12.2 (54.0)	12.6 (54.7)	13.2 (55.8)	14.9 (58.8)	16.1 (61.0)	17.7 (63.9)	18.5 (65.3)	18.5 (65.3)	17.7 (63.9)	15.2 (59.4)	14.0 (57.2)	15.3 (59.5)
Record low °C (°F)	8.4 (47.1)	8.5 (47.3)	9.6 (49.3)	10.4 (50.7)	11.9 (53.4)	13.4 (56.1)	14.9 (58.8)	15.6 (60.1)	16.1 (61.0)	14.8 (58.6)	11.6 (52.9)	9.9 (49.8)	8.4 (47.1)
Average precipitation mm (inches)	207.6 (8.17)	120.8 (4.76)	132.0 (5.20)	46.3 (1.82)	36.9 (1.45)	106.4 (4.19)	16.2 (0.64)	23.4 (0.92)	71.0 (2.80)	76.8 (3.02)	79.2 (3.12)	170.1 (6.70)	1,086.7 (42.79)
Average relative humidity (%)	79	76	77	79	78	78	77	77	78	79	81	78	78
Source: Seixal - ISEIXA2 - WUNDERGROUND
