= Ribeira da Janela =

- Civil parish
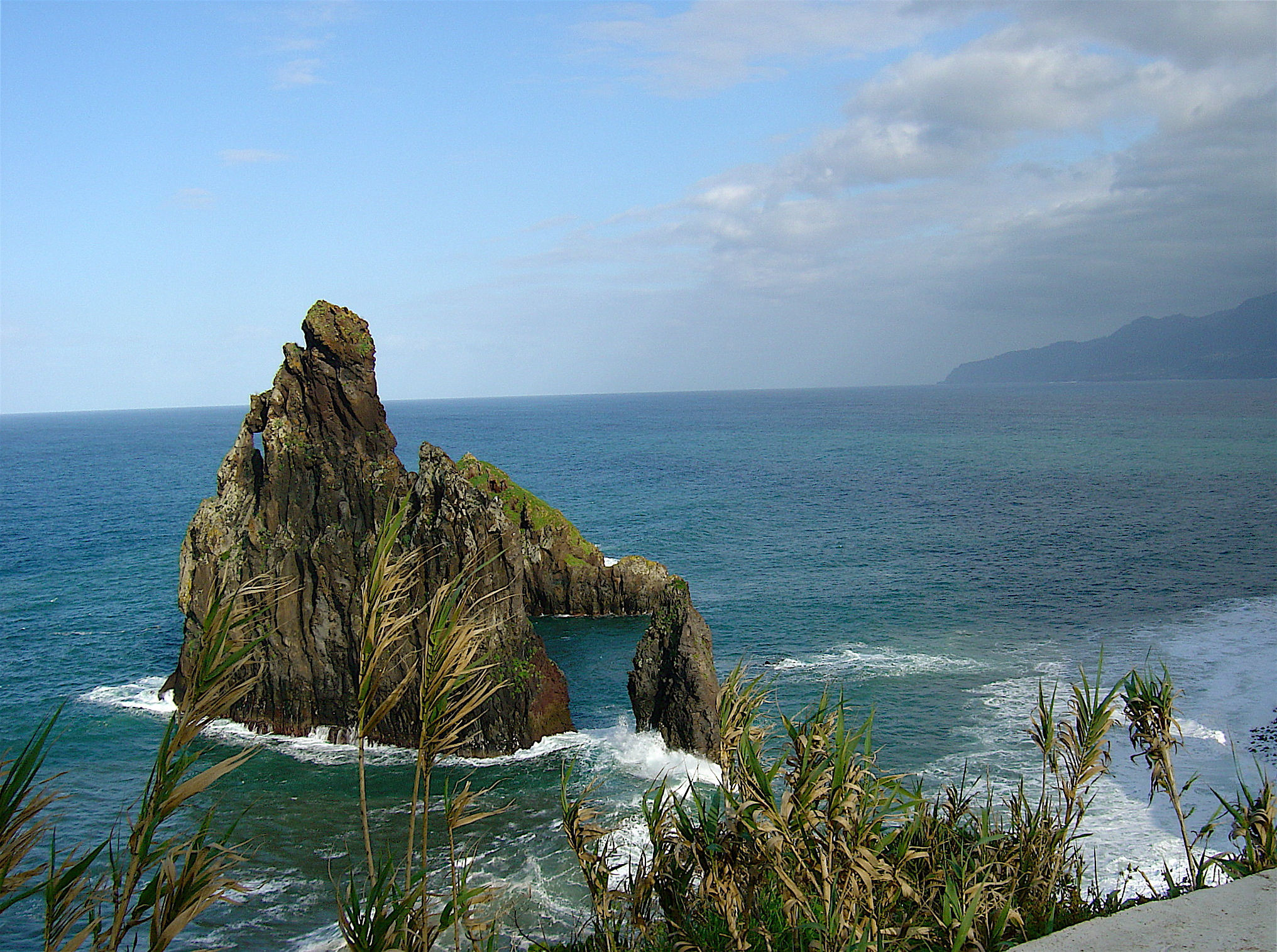
- Rocky coast and islet of Ribeira da Janela

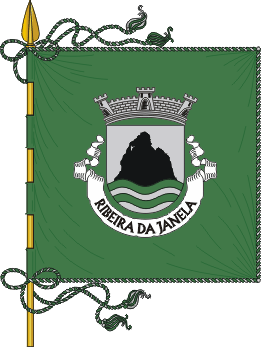
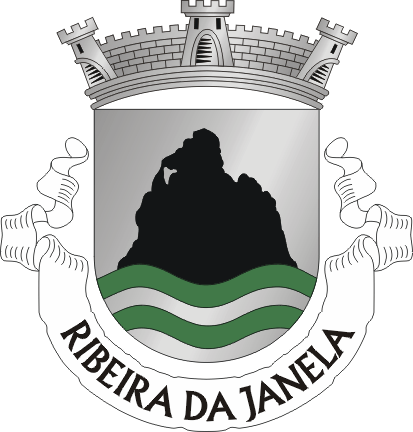
- Flag Coat of arms

- Location in Madeira
- Coordinates: 32°48′35″N 17°9′10″W
- Country: Portugal
- Auton. region: Madeira
- Island: Madeira
- Municipality: Porto Moniz

Area
  - Total: 18.48 km^{2} (7.14 sq mi)
- Elevation: 924 m (3,031 ft)

Population (2011)
  - Total: 228
  - Density: 12.3/km^{2} (32.0/sq mi)
- Time zone: UTC+00:00 (WET)
  - Summer (DST): UTC+01:00 (WEST)
- Postal code: 9270-101
- Area code: 291
- Patron: Nossa Senhora da Encarnação

Ribeira da Janela is a civil parish (Portuguese: freguesia) in the municipality of Porto Moniz in the Portuguese islands of Madeira. The population in 2011 was 228, in an area of 18.48 km^{2}.

== History ==
The parish was marked by a massive exodus in the 1960s, from which it has yet not recovered.

== Geography ==
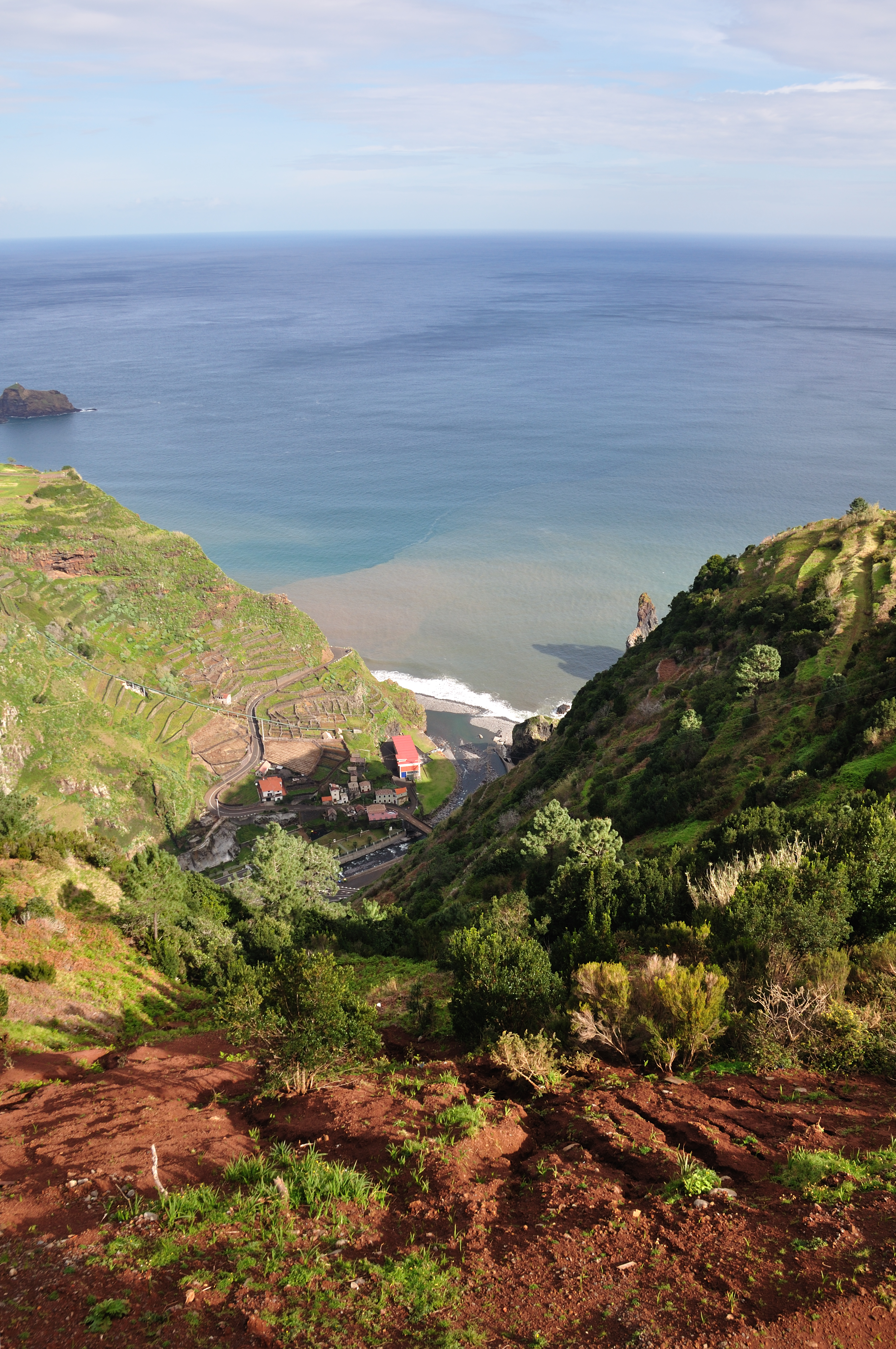
The mouth of the Ribeira da Janela river valley, in the community of the same name

It is located northeast coast of the municipality of Porto Moniz, connected by the main roadway that circles the island to the principal communities in Funchal and Calheta. Mountainous, the parish is cut by several river valleys extending into the Atlantic Ocean from the interior plateau of Paul da Serra, where it borders the municipalities of Ponta do Sol and Calheta. The ravine, Ribeira da Janela, meanders through the parish from Paul da Serra (springing from the plateau at around 1,420 metres altitude) and flows at various intervals along the water course. The valley cut by this ravine is one of the longest in Madeira. Forests dominate the northern and the western parts of the valley and while brush characterises the remaining areas.
