= CSS Texas =

CSS Texas is the name of two ships in the Confederate States Navy:

- CSS Texas (1863), a steam commerce raider better known as the Spanish screw corvette Tornado
- CSS Texas (1865), an ironclad ram unfinished at the end of the war
