= Spanish ironclad Sagunto =

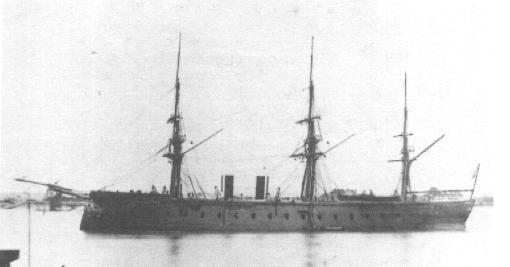
- Sagunto at anchor

History

Spain
- Name: Principe Alfonso or Principe Don Alfonso (see text)
- Namesake: Alfonso, Prince of Asturias
- Ordered: As ship of the line; By 1858 or in December 1862 (see text); As armored frigate; 5 October 1862 (see text)
- Builder: Reales Astilleros de Esteiro, Ferrol, Spain
- Cost: 7,230,049 pesetas
- Laid down: 1858 or 21 March 1863
- Renamed: Sagunto 13 October 1868
- Namesake: Siege of Saguntum
- Launched: 26 April 1869
- Renamed: Amadeo I 13 February 1871
- Namesake: King Amadeo I of Spain
- Renamed: Sagunto 4 March 1873
- Namesake: Siege of Saguntum
- Completed: 1 February 1877
- Commissioned: 1 February 1877
- Stricken: 1891
- Fate: Sold 1896; Scrapped 1897
- Notes: In reserve from 1886, then hulked

General characteristics
- Type: Central-battery ironclad
- Displacement: 7,352 t (7,236 long tons)
- Length: 89.5 m (293 ft 8 in) (waterline)
- Beam: 17.3 m (56 ft 9 in)
- Draft: 8.4 m (28 ft)
- Installed power: 8 boilers; 3,700 ihp (2,800 kW)
- Propulsion: 1 shaft, 2 compound-expansion steam engines
- Sail plan: Ship rig
- Speed: 12.5 knots (23.2 km/h; 14.4 mph)
- Complement: 554
- Armament: 8 × single 229 mm (9 in) rifled muzzle-loader (RML) guns; 3 × 180 mm (7.1 in) RML guns
- Armor: Belt: 150 mm (5.9 in); Battery: 150 mm (5.9 in)

Sagunto was a wooden-hulled Spanish Navy (Armada Real) armored frigate commissioned in 1877. A very lengthy construction period and design flaws in her construction led to a short service life of only ten years, and she was decommissioned in 1887 and stricken from the naval register in 1891.

Sagunto was named for the Siege of Saguntum, an event in 219 BC that triggered the Second Punic War.

== Design and description ==
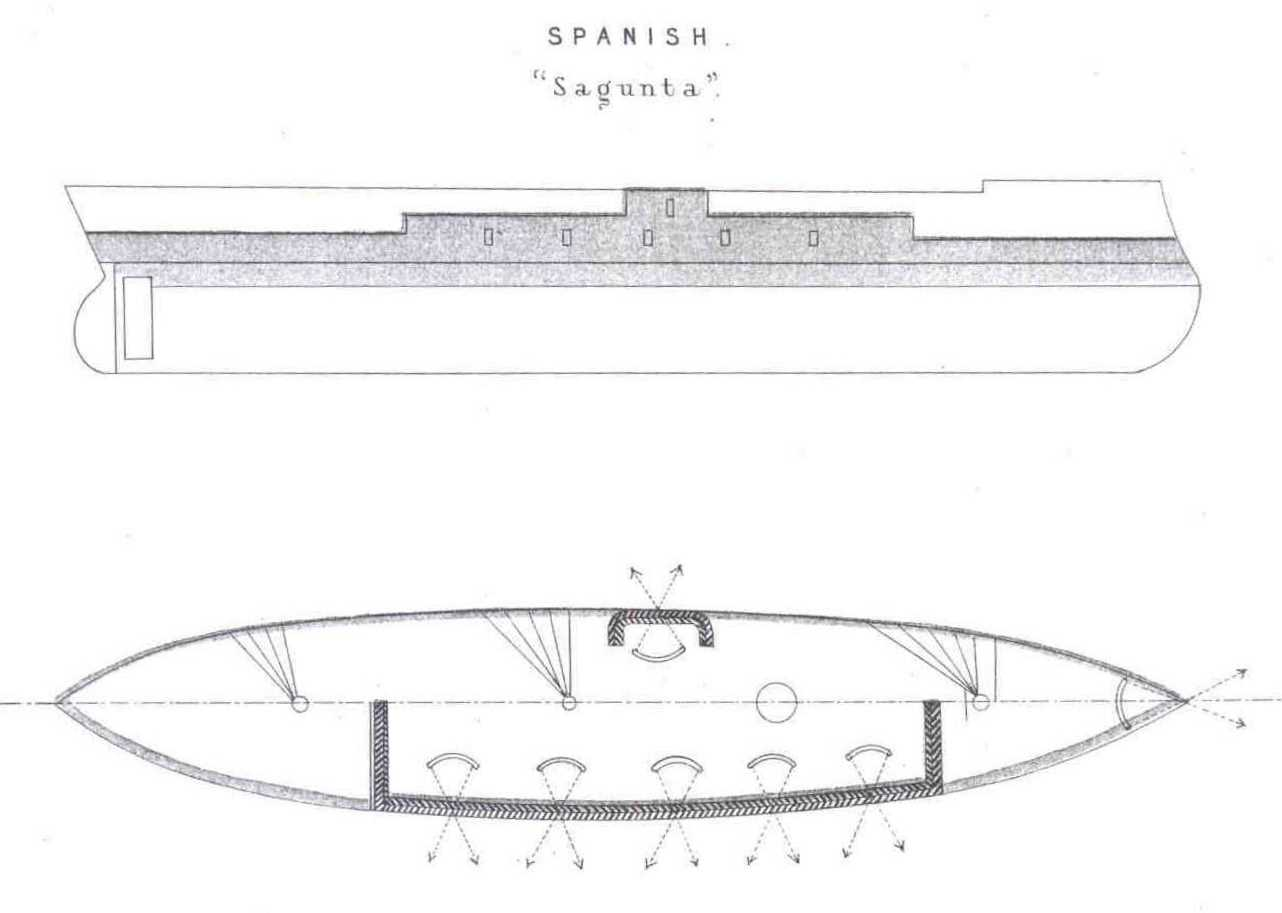
Plan and right-elevation drawing of Segunto; the shaded areas show armor protection

Segunto was 89.5 meters (293 ft 8 in) long at the waterline, had a beam of 17.3 meters (56 ft 9 in) and a draft of 8.4 meters (27 ft 7 in). She displaced 7,352 metric tons (7,236 long tons) and was fitted with a ram bow. Her crew consisted of 554 officers and enlisted men.

The ship was fitted with a pair of imported Forges et Chantiers de la Méditerranée compound-expansion steam engines that drove one propeller shaft using steam provided by eight cylindrical boilers. The engines were rated at a nominal total of 1,000 horsepower (746 kW) or 3,700 indicated horsepower (2,759 kW) and gave Sagunto a speed of 12.5 knots (23.2 km/h; 14.4 mph) The ironclad carried a maximum of 900 metric tons (886 long tons) of coal. She was fitted with a three-masted ship rig with a sail area of 2,400 square meters (26,000 sq ft).

The frigate's main battery was originally intended to consist of thirty 200-millimeter (7.9 in) smoothbore guns mounted on the broadside, but she was completed with eight single Armstrong-Whitworth 229-millimeter (9 in) rifled muzzle-loading (RML) guns on the main deck arranged on the central-battery principle. On the upper deck were two Trubia 180-millimeter (7.1 in) RML guns, one on each broadside, and another in the forecastle as the forward chase gun. By 1883, the Trubia guns had been replaced by Palliser RMLs of the same caliber.

Sagunto had a complete wrought iron waterline belt of 150-millimeter (5.9 in) armor plates. Above the belt, the guns, except for the chase gun, were protected by an equal thickness of armor. The ends of the ship and the deck were unarmored.

== Construction and commissioning ==
Sources provide two different accounts of Sagunto′s construction. According to one, she was ordered in December 1862 as the 100-gun ship of the line Principe Don Alfonso. She was laid down at the Reales Astilleros de Esteiro (Esteiro Royal Shipyard) in Ferrol, Spain, on 21 March 1863 and renamed Segunto in 1868 while she was being converted into a central battery ironclad. She was launched on 26 April 1869 and commissioned on 1 February 1877.

According to another source, Sagunto was laid down in 1858 as the 100-gun ship of the line Principe Alfonso. In 1860, the Spanish government decided to construct her as an armored frigate instead, and this was authorized on 5 October 1862 at a cost of an additional 1,401,151 pesetas. She was renamed Sagunto on 13 October 1868 and was launched on 26 April 1869. Designed to reach a speed of 10 to 12.5 knots (18.5 to 23.2 km/h; 11.5 to 14.4 mph), she could do no better than 5 knots (9.3 km/h; 5.8 mph) during sea trials. Modifications to her stern and propeller followed to correct the problem, and these changes resulted in her achieving a speed of 10.5 knots (19.4 km/h; 12.1 mph). Renamed Amadeo I by a Royal Order of 13 February 1871 and Sagunto again by an order of 4 March 1873, she finally was completed in 1877, 19 years after she was laid down as a ship of the line and 15 years after the authorization of her construction as an ironclad. Her total construction cost was 7,230,049 pesetas.

== Service history ==
In 1880, Sagunto began an assignment to the Training Squadron, commanded by Contralmirante (Counter Admiral) José Polo de Bernabé y Mordella. During the summer of 1881, Sagunto and other ships of the squadron (the armored frigate Zaragoza, the screw frigates Almansa, Carmén, and Villa de Madrid, the screw corvette Tornado, the screw schooner Concordia, and the gunboat Pelícano) operated in the waters off Galicia during a visit to the Galician estuaries by King Alfonso XII and Queen Maria Christina. With Sagunto serving as Polo de Bernabé's flagship, the squadron conducted maneuvers in their presence on 9 August, after which the monarchs and the Minister of the Navy, Admiral Francisco de Paula Pavía Pavía, embarked on Sagunto on 13 August and the squadron proceeded to La Coruña and then to Villagarcía de Arosa, which it reached on 15 August. On 18 August, the squadron departed Marín with the king and queen aboard Sagunto; the monarchs disembarked at Vigo on 19 August. On 25 August, the king and queen boarded Pelícano to visit Bayonne, France. Finally, Alfonso XII and Maria Christina concluded their visit to the squadron with a voyage to Santander aboard Sagunto, while Villa de Madrid remained behind at Vigo and the rest of the ships proceeded to Ferrol at the end of August 1881.

By 1885 Sagunto′s wooden hull was entirely rotten, and she was placed in reserve in 1886 and declared obsolete in 1887 after only ten years of service. Her lengthy construction period and the rapid deterioration of her hull both contributed to her short service life.

== Final disposition ==
Sagunto was stricken from the naval register in 1891. In February 1893, the Spanish government ordered her sale at auction, but she attracted no buyers. She continued to serve, hulked as a floating jetty, until 1896, when a scrap dealer in Palma de Mallorca on Mallorca in the Balearic Islands acquired her. She was scrapped at Palma de Mallorca in 1897.

== Bibliography ==
- Bordejé y Morencos, Fernando de (1995). Crónica de la Marina española en el siglo XIX, 1868-1898 (in Spanish). Vol. II. Madrid: Ministry of Defence.
- Brassey, Thomas (1888). The Naval Annual 1887. Portsmouth, England: J. Griffin. OCLC 669097244.
- de Saint Hubert, Christian (1984). "Early Spanish Steam Warships, Part II". Warship International. XXI (1): 21–45. ISSN 0043-0374.
- González, Marcelino (2009). 50 Barcos españoles (in Spanish). Gijón, Spain: Fundación Alvargonzález.
- González, Marcelino (2012). Otros 50 Barcos españoles (in Spanish). Gijón, Spain: Fundación Alvargonzález.
- González-Llanos Galvache, Santiago (1996). La construcción naval en Ferrol durante el siglo XIX. Cuaderno monográfico nº 29 (in Spanish). Madrid: Instituto de Historia y Cultura Naval.
- Lledó Calabuig, José (1998). Buques de vapor de la armada española, del vapor de ruedas a la fragata acorazada, 1834-1885 (in Spanish). Agualarga Editores. ISBN 8495088754.
- Lyon, Hugh (1979). "Spain". In Chesneau, Roger & Kolesnik, Eugene M. (eds.). Conway's All the World's Fighting Ships 1860–1905. Greenwich, UK: Conway Maritime Press. pp. 380–386. ISBN 0-8317-0302-4.
- Rodríguez González, Agustín Ramón; Coello Lillo, José Luis (2003). La fragata en la Armada española. 500 años de historia (in Spanish). IZAR. Construcciones Navales, S.A.
- Silverstone, Paul H. (1984). Directory of the World's Capital Ships. New York: Hippocrene Books. ISBN 0-88254-979-0.
- VV.AA (1999). El Buque en la Armada española (in Spanish). Madrid: Editorial Sílex.
