= Igreja de Nossa Senhora da Conceição, Porto Moniz =

Igreja de Nossa Senhora da Conceição
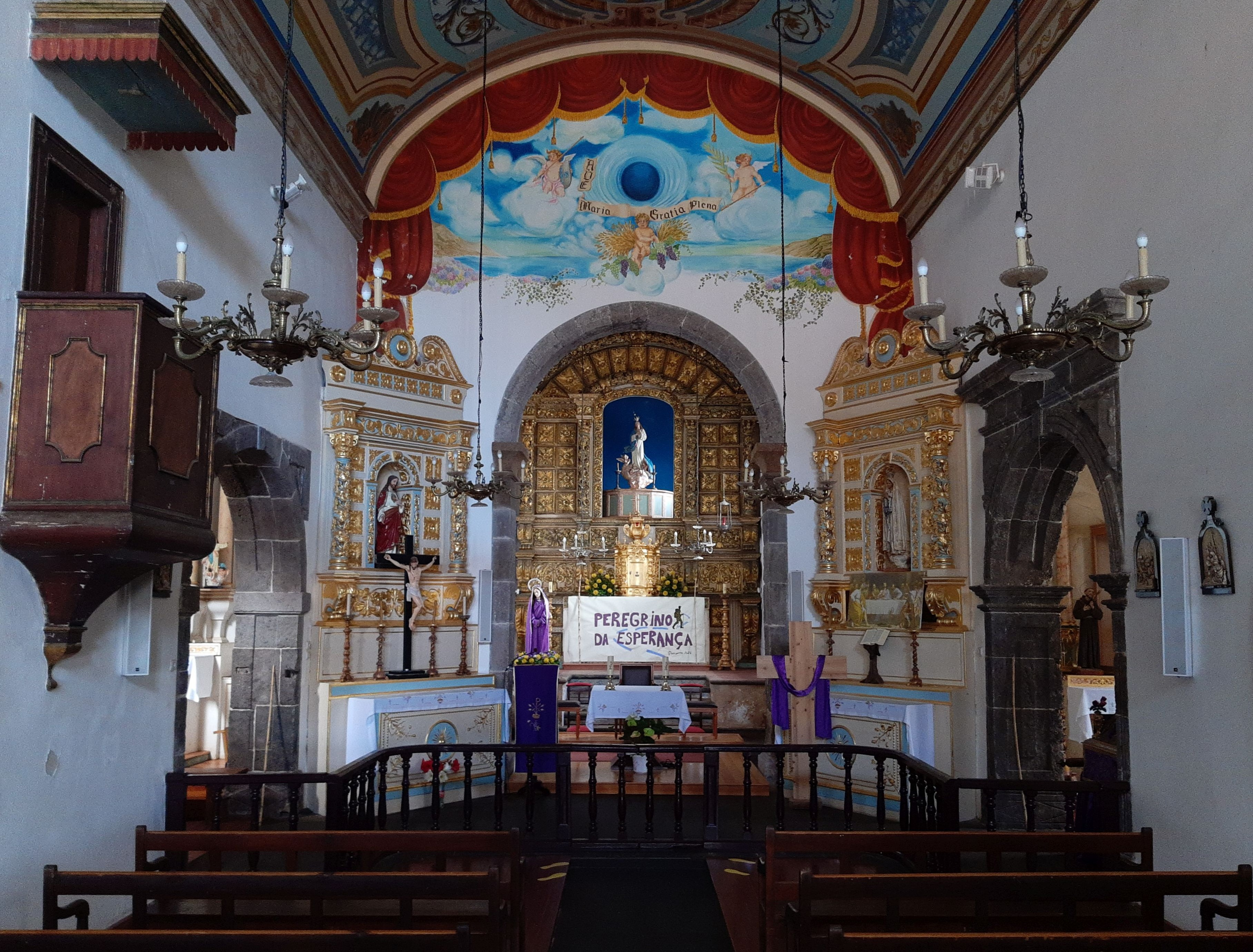
- Interior in 2024
- Igreja de Nossa Senhora da Conceição
- 32°51′56″N 17°10′19″W
- Address: Porto Moniz, Madeira
- Country: Portugal
- Denomination: Catholic

History
- Status: Parish church
- Dedication: Our Lady of the Conception

Administration
- Diocese: Funchal

The Igreja de Nossa Senhora da Conceição is the main church in the parish of Porto Moniz, Madeira, built in the 18th century.

== History ==
Francisco Moniz founded a small chapel near the coast at Porto Moniz and dedicated to Our Lady of the Conception. It was destroyed by an earthquake in 1748. The present church was built, on a higher property. It became the mother church (Igreja Matriz) of the parish. The parish belongs to the Diocese of Funchal.

The high altar was created by Manuel Pereira de Almeida and Manuel da Silva in the 17th century. The organ was built by a workshop in Lamego. The altar paintings in two side chapels date to the transition from rococo to neoclassical.
