= Porto Moniz =

- Municipality
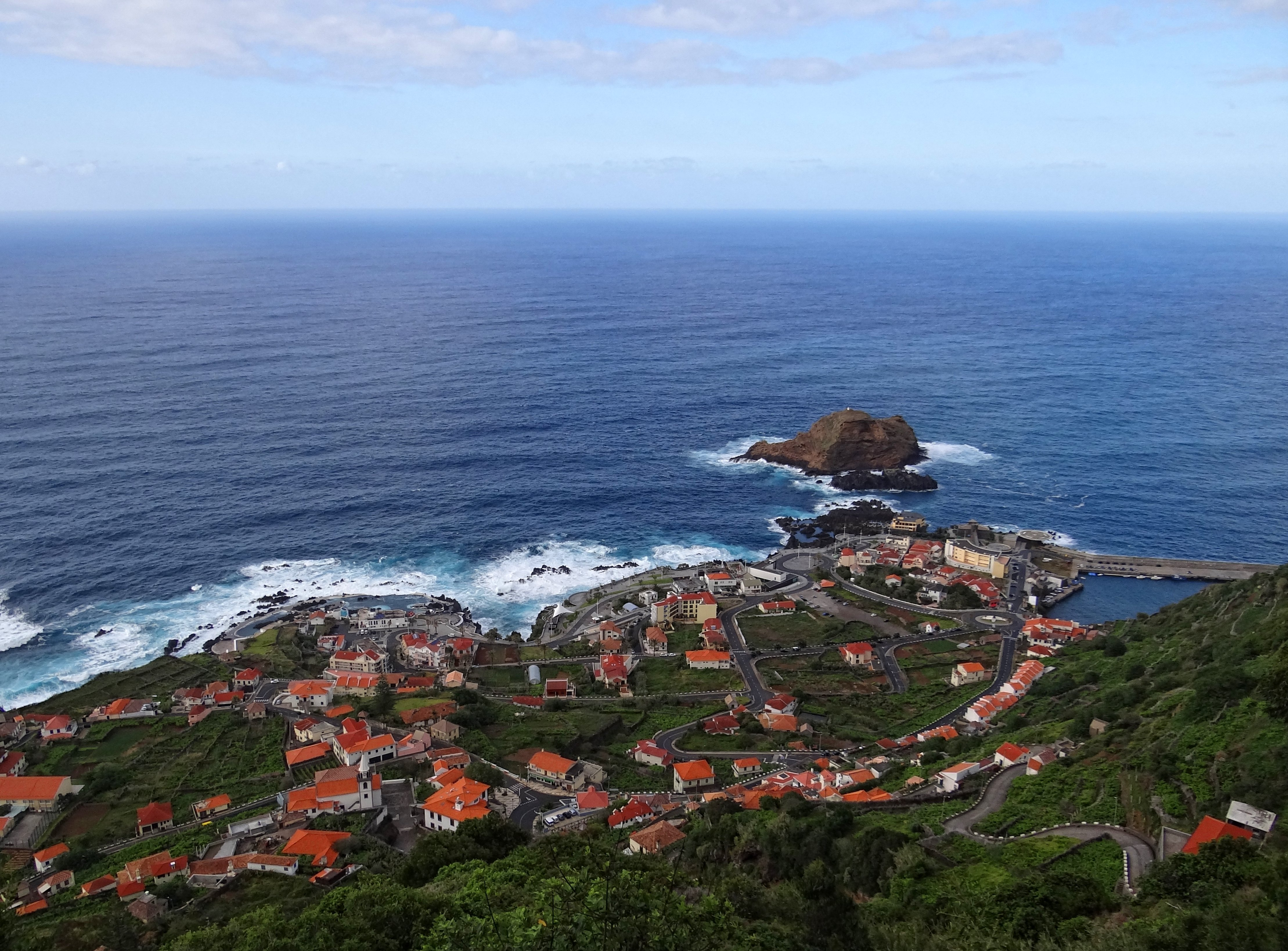
- The main settlement of Porto Moniz

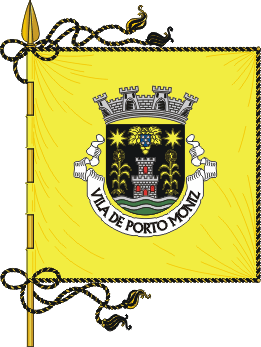
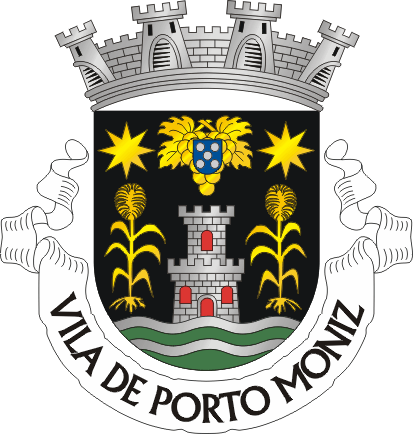
- Flag Coat of arms
- Interactive map of Porto Moniz
- Coordinates: 32°48′45″N 17°8′45″W
- Country: Portugal
- Auton. region: Madeira
- Island: Madeira
- Established: Settlement: fl. 1475; Municipality: 13 October 1835
- Parishes: 4

Area
  - Total: 82.93 km^{2} (32.02 sq mi)

Population (2011)
  - Total: 2,711
  - Density: 32.69/km^{2} (84.67/sq mi)
- Time zone: UTC+00:00 (WET)
  - Summer (DST): UTC+01:00 (WEST)
- Postal code: 9270-053
- Area code: 291
- Patron: Nossa Senhora da Conceição
- Local holiday: 22 July
- Website: http://www.portomoniz.pt

Porto Moniz (Portuguese pronunciation: [ˈpoɾtu muˈniʃ]) is a municipality in the northwest corner of the island of Madeira. It is located west of Santana and Machico, and northwest of Funchal. The population in 2011 was 2,711, in an area of 82.93 km^{2}.

The municipality features a natural complex of lava pools that are popular with locals and tourists.

== History ==
It is unclear when the area of Porto Moniz was first colonized, although it is likely that it occurred at the beginning of the last quarter of the 15th century. Francisco Moniz O Velho, is referred to as one of these first settlers, who had uncultivated lands in this area and was responsible for establishing a farm and chapel. The first settlers were mainly engaged in grain cultivation, cattle breeding and timber harvesting. Francisco Moniz was a nobleman from the Algarve, who married Filipa da Câmara (daughter of Garcia Rodrigues da Câmara). He was one of the sons of João Gonçalves Zarco, the discoverer of Porto Santo (1418) with Tristão Vaz Teixeira and later the island of Madeira with Bartolomeu Perestrelo (1419).

From the 18th century, vines were cultivated in the area around Porto Moniz, and from the 19th century, potatoes were grown.

The municipality was created on 31 October 1835, but was quickly abolished and reestablished successively in 1849-1855, 1867-1871 and again in 1895-1898.

Porto Moniz lava pools

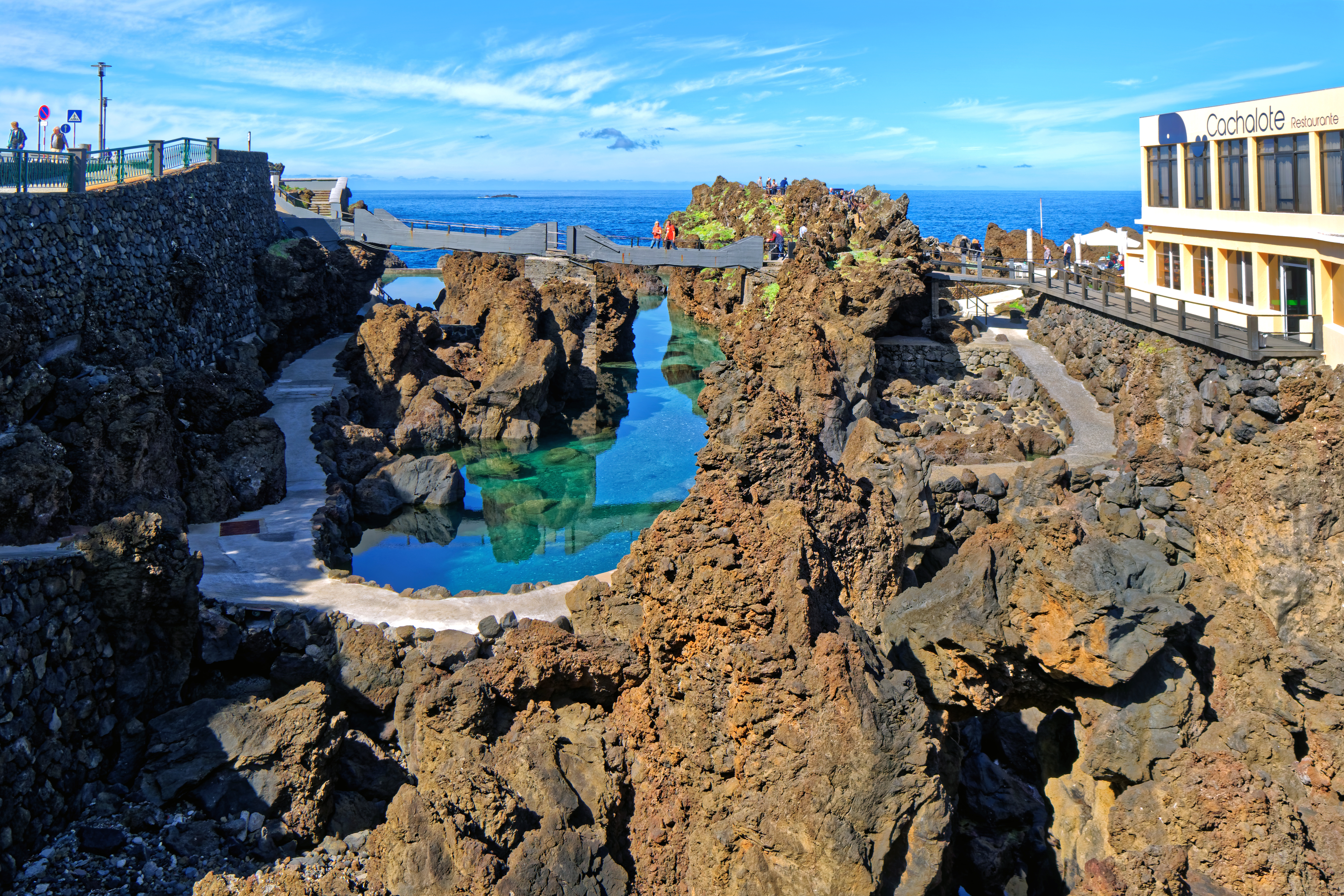

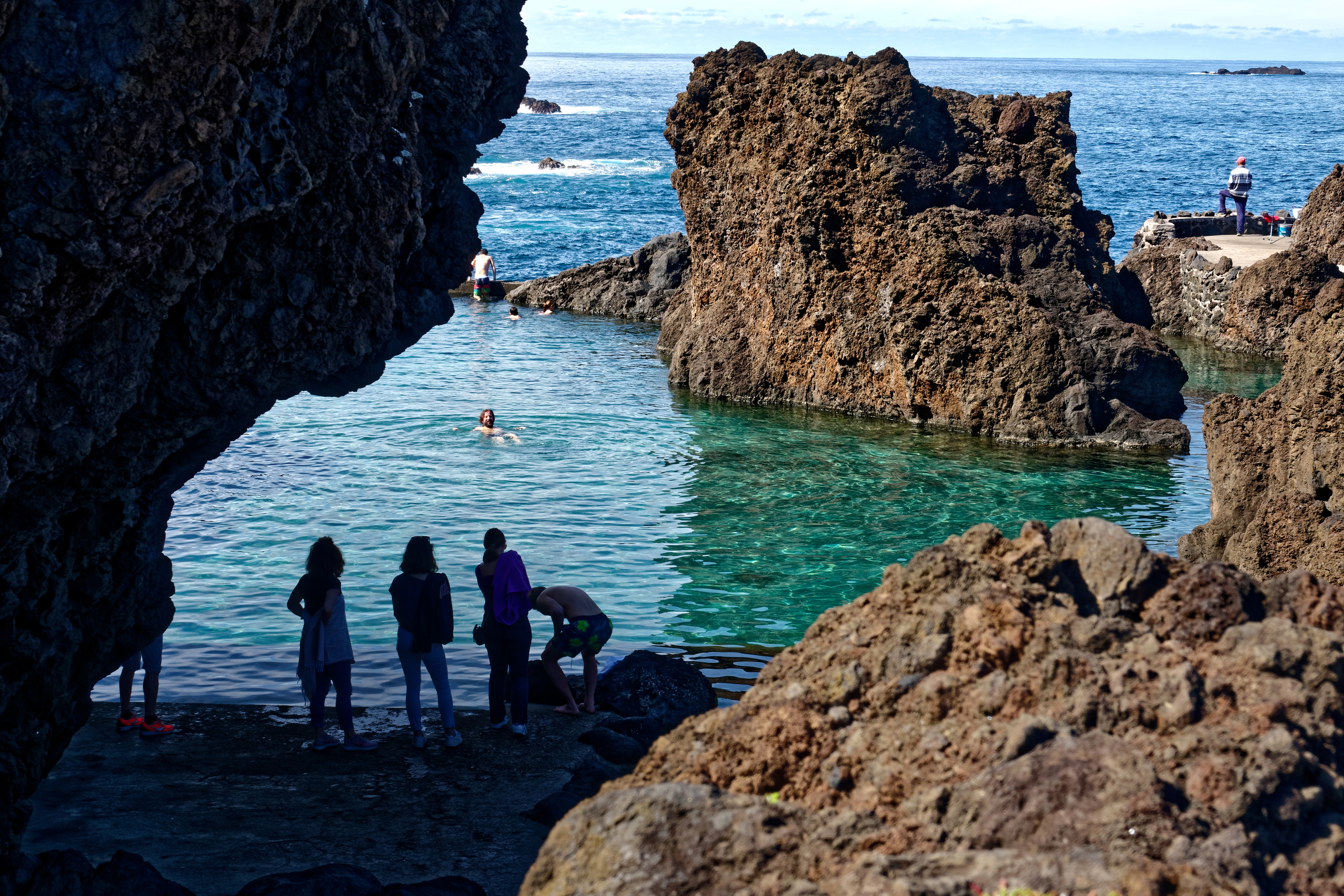

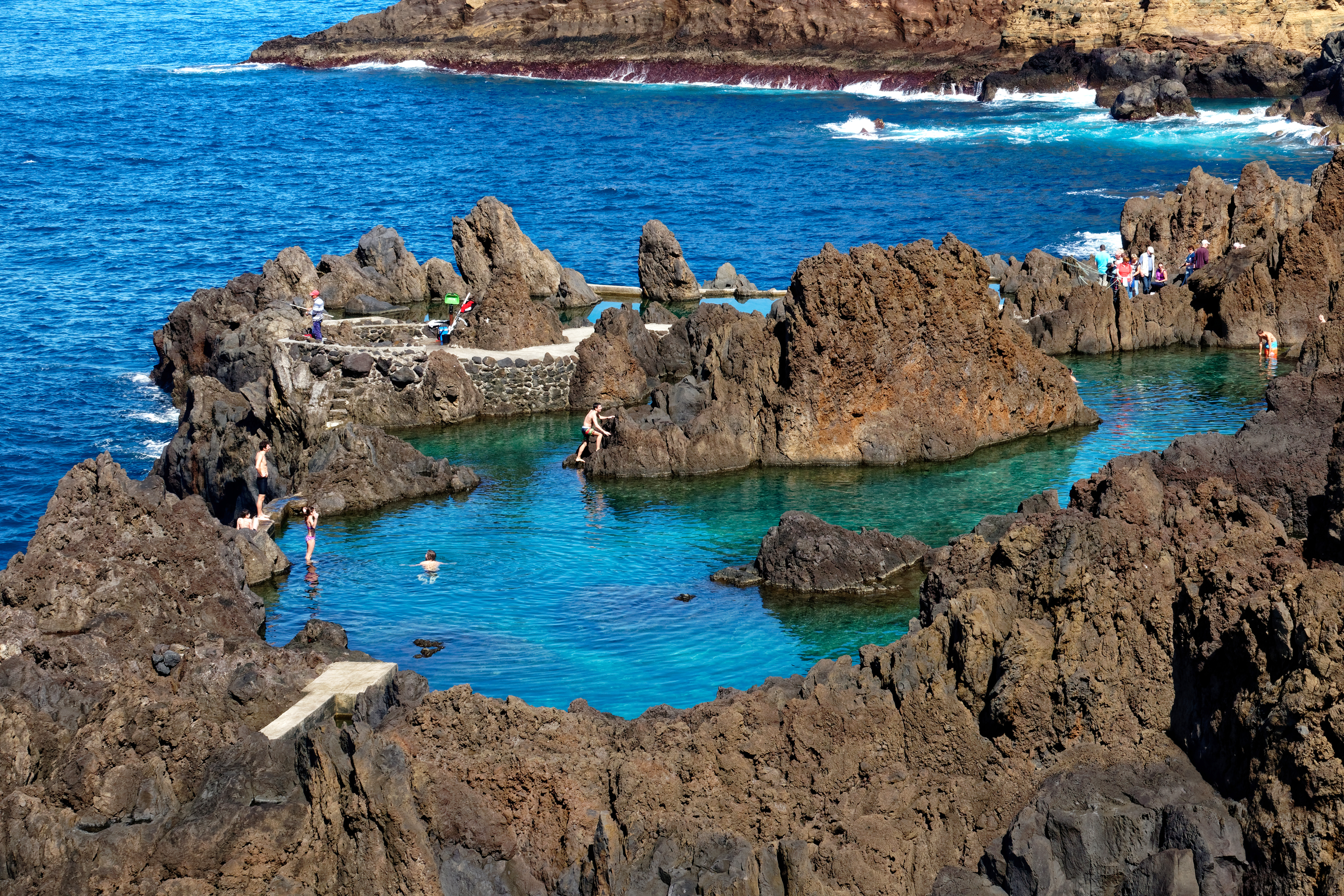

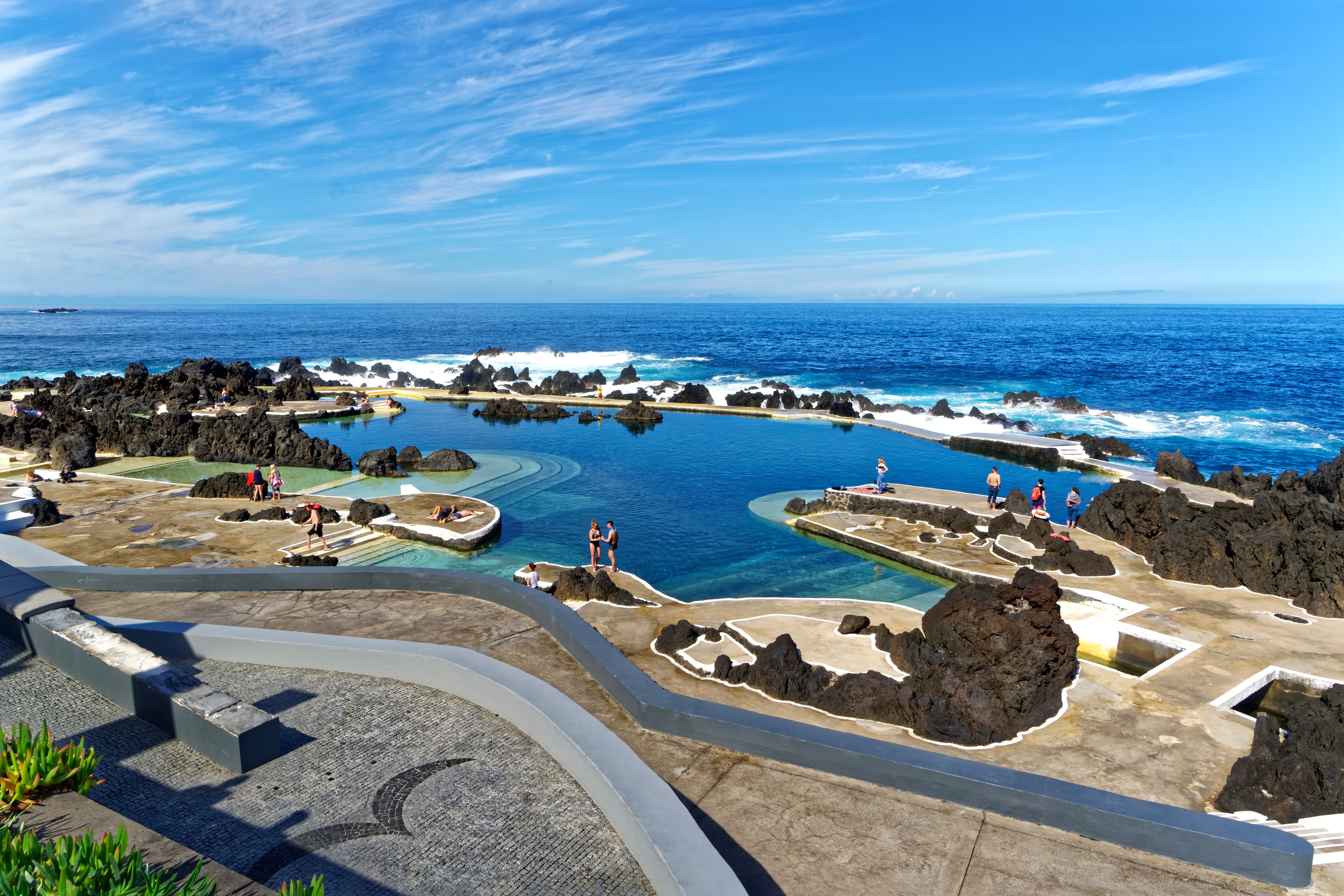

== Geography ==
Administratively, the four parishes of Porto Moniz are:

- Achadas da Cruz - the smallest parish in population and area, sharing the highest parish definition with Ribeira da Janela;
- Porto Moniz - the largest parish by population (1668 inhabitants), it includes the settlement of Santa Maria Madalena and main settlement of Porto Moniz, which is located southeast of Ponta do Tristão, which is the northernmost point on the island (at 332 m above sea level)
- Ribeira da Janela - the smallest parish in density, but one of the two highest parishes in the municipality;
- Seixal - the largest parish by area.

== Culture ==
The main church, Igreja de Nossa Senhora da Conceição, was built in the 18th century.
