= Achadas da Cruz =

Civil parish in Porto Moniz

- Civil parish
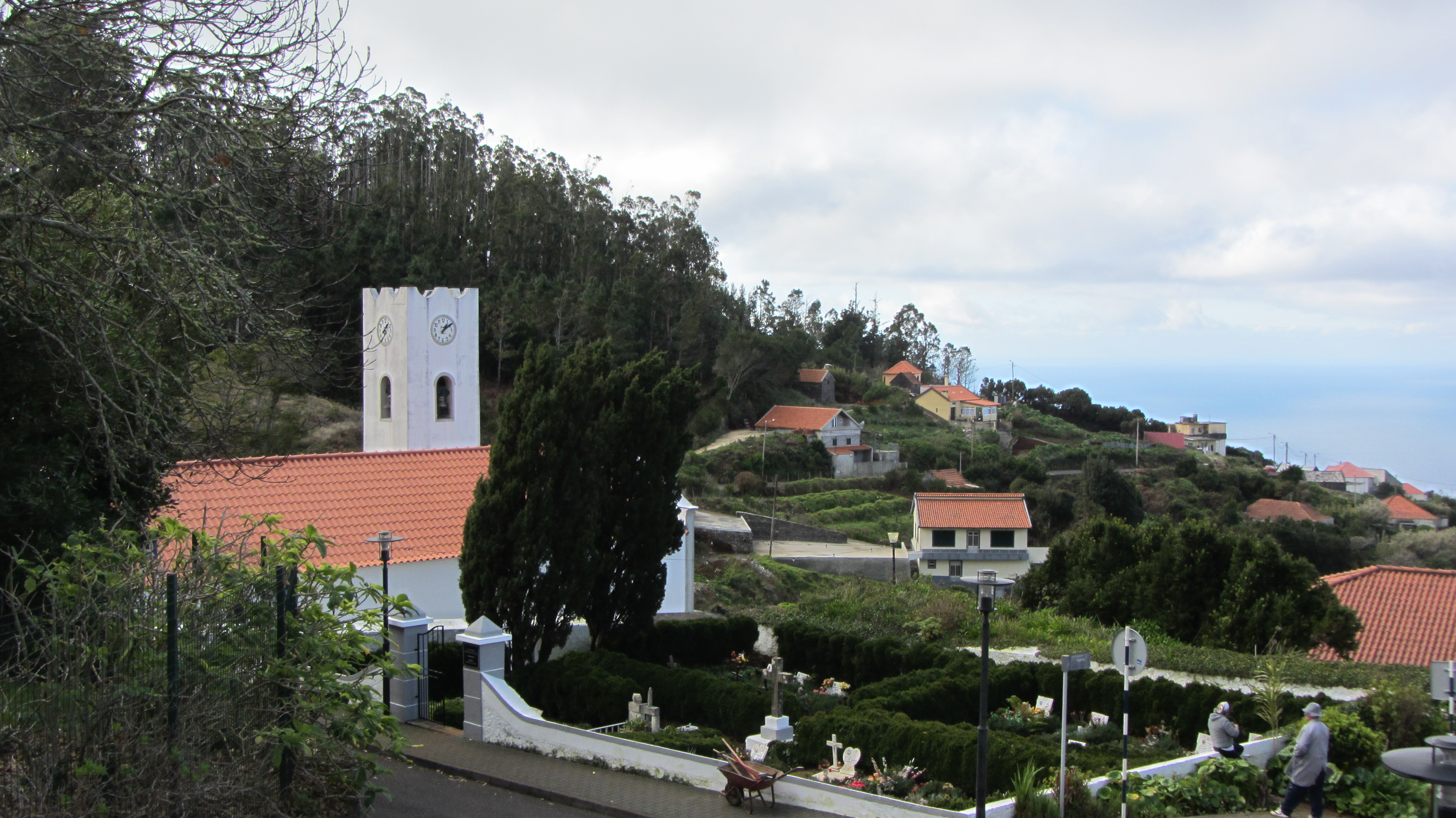
- Parish church and cemetery of Achadas da Cruz

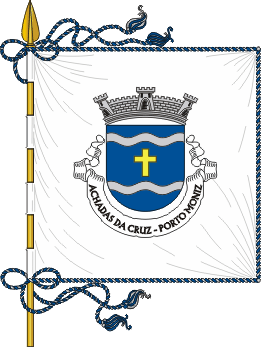
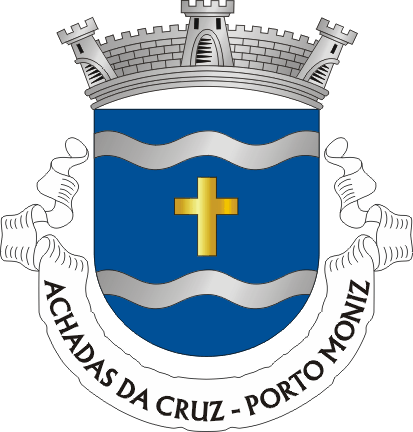
- Flag Coat of arms

- Location in Madeira
- Coordinates: 32°50′28″N 17°12′36″W
- Country: Portugal
- Auton. region: Madeira
- Island: Madeira
- Municipality: Porto Moniz

Area
  - Total: 7.88 km^{2} (3.04 sq mi)
- Elevation: 705 m (2,313 ft)

Population (2011)
  - Total: 159
  - Density: 20.2/km^{2} (52.3/sq mi)
- Time zone: UTC+00:00 (WET)
  - Summer (DST): UTC+01:00 (WEST)
- Postal code: 9270-013
- Area code: 291
- Patron: Nossa Senhora do Livramento

Achadas da Cruz is a civil parish in the municipality of Porto Moniz in the Portuguese island of Madeira. The population in 2011 was 159, in an area of 7.88 km^{2}. It is situated on the north-western coast of the island. No children were born in the parish between 2001 and 2009.

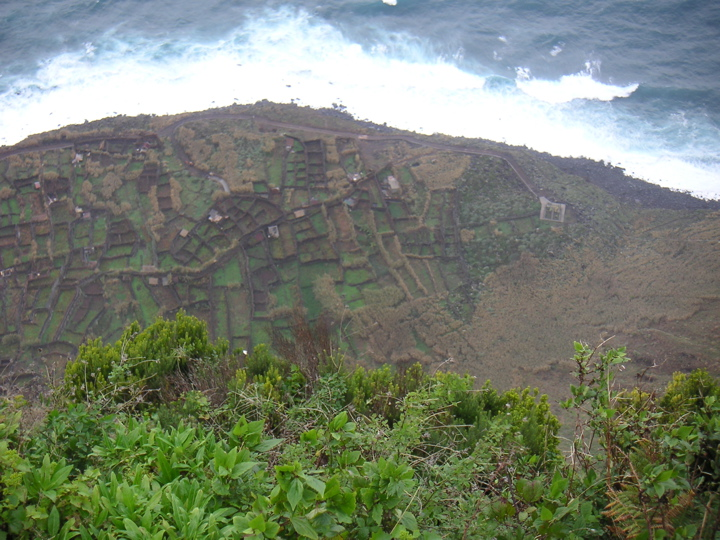
The fields of Quebrada Nova, as seen from the cable car along the western coast of Achadas da Cruz

Society

Between 1835 And 1840 this parish registered 18 marriages. The first registered marriage in this parish was in the year 1827. From 1860 to 1911 this parish witnessed 824 baptisms. Between 1910 and 1911, there were 14 deaths associated with this parish, 4 of which were of people who died at that time with an age over 18.

== Architecture ==
- Chapel of Nossa Senhora do Livramento
