= Ponta do Tristão =

Point of Madeira, Portugal

Coordinates: 32°52′00.8″N 17°12′01.1″W

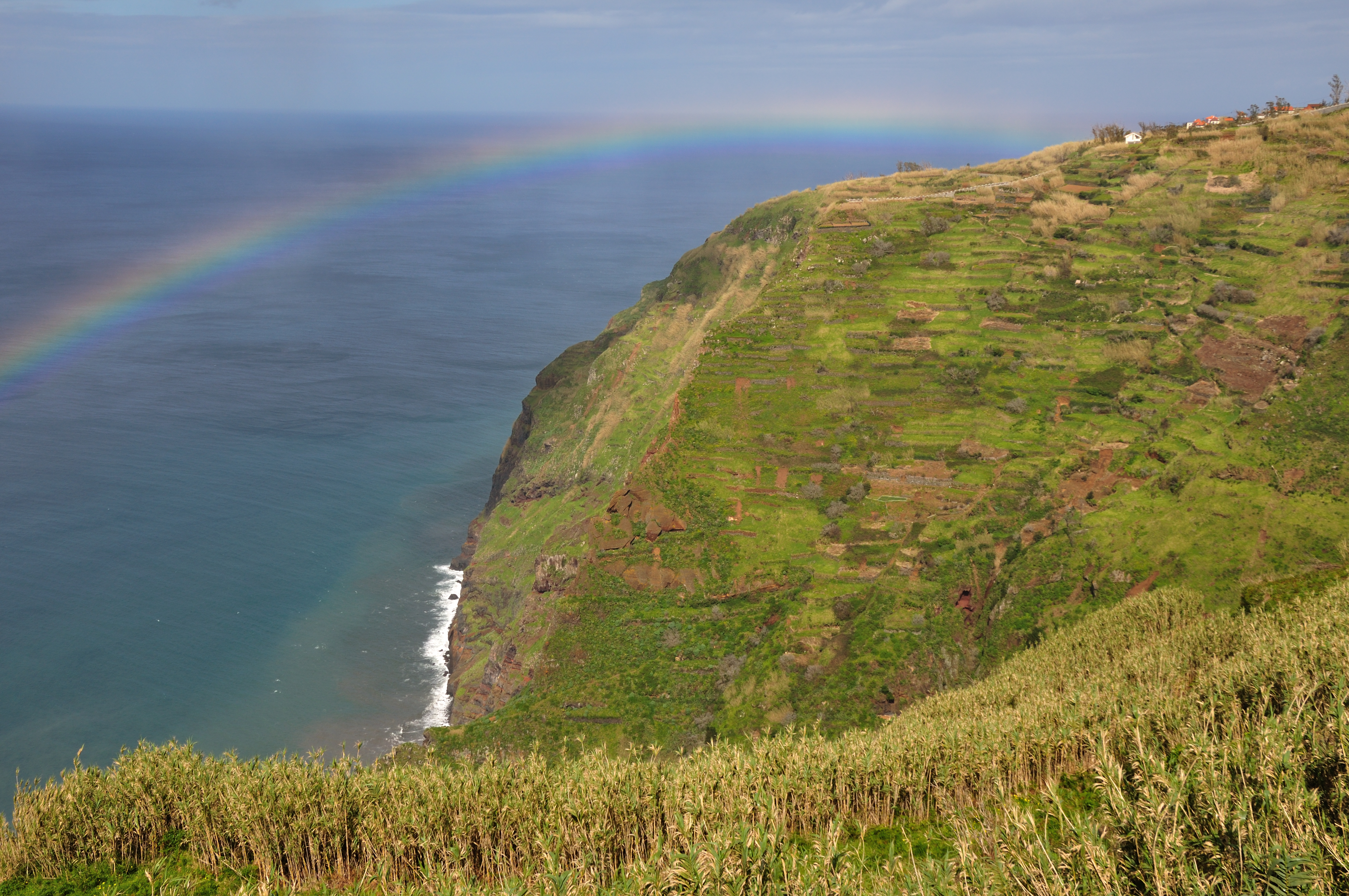

Ponta do Tristão is the northernmost point of the island of Madeira. It is located in Porto Moniz parish, to the northwest of the settlement of Santa Maria Madalena.
