= Spanish ship Navarra =

Various Spanish Navy ships

Three ships of the Spanish Navy have borne the name Navarra, after the Kingdom of Navarre:

- Spanish cruiser Navarra, an Aragon-class unprotected cruiser commissioned in 1882 and either hulked 1896 and sold for scrap in 1899 or relegated to duty as a cadet training ship in 1900.
- Spanish cruiser Navarra (1923), a light cruiser commissioned in 1923 as Reina Victoria Eugenia, renamed República in 1931 and Navarra in 1936, and decommissioned in 1956.
- Spanish frigate Navarra, a Santa Maria-class frigate commissioned in 1994.
