= Navarre (disambiguation) =

Navarre (Spanish: Navarra, Basque: Nafarroa), also known as Upper Navarre (Spanish: Alta Navarra, Basque: Nafarroa Garaia), is an autonomous community of Spain.

Navarre may also mean:

== Places ==
- Lower Navarre, historical region of southern France
- Kingdom of Navarre, historical state of Western Europe
- New Navarre, one of the provinces in New Spain

=== Australia ===
- Navarre, Victoria

=== United States ===
- Navarre, Florida
- Navarre, Kansas
- Navarre, New Orleans, Louisiana, a neighborhood
- Navarre, Ohio

== People ==
- Élodie Navarre (born 1979), French actress
- Henri Navarre (1898–1983), French general best known for his defeat at the Battle of Dien Bien Phu
- Jean Navarre (1895–1919), French aviator during World War I
- Marguerite de Navarre (1492–1549), queen consort of King Henry II of Navarre
- Peter Navarre (1785–1874), early settler in the Maumee River valley
- Yves Navarre (1940–1994), French writer

== Other uses ==
- Navarre (restaurant), a restaurant in Portland, Oregon, U.S.
- Navarre Corporation, a publishing/distribution company
- College of Navarre (Collège de Navarre), a historical college in Paris

== Navarra ==
Navarra may also mean:

- Navarra (DO), Spanish quality wine-producing region
- Navarra (Spanish Congress Electoral District)
- Spanish ship Navarra, more than one Spanish Navy ship
- André Navarra (1911–1988), French cellist
- Michele Navarra (1905–1958), Italian Sicilian mafia boss
- Nissan Navara, a pickup truck
