= Spanish frigate Lealtad (1860) =

Spanish Navy screw frigate of 1861–1893

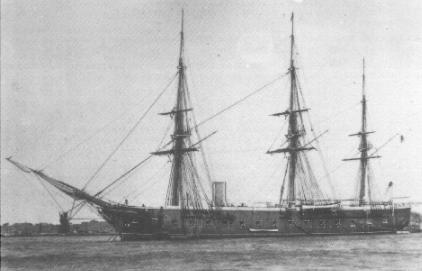

History

Armada Española Ensign First Spanish Republic
- Name: Lealtad
- Namesake: Loyalty
- Ordered: 19 September 1859 {authorized)
- Builder: Reales Astilleros de Esteiro, Ferrol, Spain
- Cost: 3,518,068 pesetas
- Laid down: 1860
- Launched: 15 October 1860
- Commissioned: 6 September 1861
- Decommissioned: 1893
- Fate: Sold for scrapping 1897

General characteristics
- Type: Screw frigate
- Displacement: 3,200 t (3,100 long tons)
- Length: 70 m (229 ft 8 in)
- Beam: 14 m (45 ft 11 in)
- Draft: 6.16 m (20 ft 3 in)
- Depth: 7.33 m (24 ft 1 in)
- Installed power: 500 hp (373 kW) (nominal)
- Propulsion: One John Penn and Sons steam engine, one shaft; 500 tons coal
- Speed: 9.5 to 11 knots (17.6 to 20.4 km/h; 10.9 to 12.7 mph)
- Complement: 500
- Armament: As built: 14 x 68-pounder (31 kg) 200 mm (7.9 in) smoothbore guns; 26 x 32-pounder (14.5 kg) 160 mm (6.3 in) rifled guns; 4 x smaller bronze guns; 1870: 21 x 68-pounder (31 kg) 200 mm (7.9 in) smoothbore guns; 6 x 32-pounder (14.5 kg) 160 mm (6.3 in) rifled guns; 1883: 24 x 68-pounder (31 kg) 200 mm (7.9 in) smoothbore guns; 2 x Hontoria 90 mm (3.5 in) guns; 2 x Hontoria 70 mm (2.8 in) guns; 2 x machine guns

Lealtad (Loyalty) was the lead ship of the Spanish Navy′s Lealtad-class of screw frigates. Commissioned in 1861, she operated in the Caribbean during the Chincha Islands War of 1865–1866 and in Cuba during the Ten Years' War of 1868–1878. From 1883 she served as a training ship. She was decommissioned in 1893 and sold for scrapping in 1897.

== Characteristics ==
Lealtad was a Lealtad-class frigate screw frigate with a wooden hull. She had three masts and a bowsprit. She displaced 3,200 tons. She was 70 metres (229 ft 8 in) long, 14 metres (45 ft 11 in) in beam, 7.33 metres (24 ft 1 in) in depth, and 6.16 metres (20 ft 3 in) in draft. She had a John Penn and Sons steam engine rated at a nominal 500 horsepower (373 kW) that generated 1,900 indicated horsepower (1,417 kW), giving her a speed of 9.5 to 11 knots (17.6 to 20.4 km/h; 10.9 to 12.7 mph). She could carry up to 550 tons of coal. Sources disagree on her armament, one claiming it consisted of fourteen 68-pounder (31 kg) 200-millimetre (7.9 in) smoothbore guns and twenty-six 32-pounder (14.5 kg) 160-millimetre (6.3 in) guns as well as four smaller bronze guns for disembarkation and use in her boats, while another asserts that she was armed with one 220-millimetre (8.7 in) swivel gun on her bow, twenty 68-pounder (31 kg) 200-millimetre (7.9 in) smoothbore guns, fourteen 32-pounder (14.5 kg) 160-millimetre (6.3 in) guns, and six guns — two 150-millimetre (5.9 in) howitzers, two 120-millimetre (4.7 in) rifled guns, and two short 80-millimetre (3.1 in) rifled guns — for use in her boats. She had a crew of 480 or 500 men, according to different sources.

== Construction and commissioning ==
Lealtad′s construction was authorized on 14 September 1859. Her keel was laid at the Reales Astilleros de Esteiro in Ferrol, Spain, in 1860. She was launched on 15 October 1860 and commissioned on 6 September 1861. Her construction cost was 3,518,068 pesetas.

== Service history ==
After commissioning, Lealtad deployed to the Caribbean with her base at Havana in the Captaincy General of Cuba. A break in relations between Spain and Mexico occurred in 1861 when Spain insisted on the settlement of damage claims it had made. A Spanish squadron under the command of Joaquín Gutierrez de Rubalcava which included Lealtad departed Havana to transport a landing force under the command of General Juan Prim to Veracruz as part of a mulitnational intervention in Mexico. The ships and landing force seized Veracruz on 14 December 1861, and French and British forces arrived in January 1862. Spanish and British forces withdrew from Mexico in April 1862 when it became apparent that France intended to seize control of Mexico, and Lealtad returned to Cuba. She returned to Spain in August 1864, but when the Spanish government learned that France intended to make Maximilian I emperor of Mexico, she received orders to return to Cuba.

During the Chincha Islands War of 1865–1866, Lealtad and the screw frigate Nuestra Señora del Carmén operated in the Caribbean. Lealtad returned to Spain in 1868 and was at Cádiz in September 1868 when Queen Isabella II was deposed in the Glorious Revolution. The Ten Years' War broke out in Cuba in 1868, and in 1869 Lealtad once again deployed there to support Spanish Empire forces fighting against insurgents of the Cuban Liberation Army. Her armament underwent alterations in 1870, leaving her with one 200-millimetre (7.9 in) smoothbore gun on her bow and twenty 68-pounder (31 kg) 200-millimetre (7.9 in) smoothbore guns and fourteen 32-pounder (14.5 kg) 160-millimetre (6.3 in) guns in her battery.

Lealtad returned to Spain in 1882 and was assigned to the Training Squadron under the overall command of Contralmirante (Counter Admiral) Luis Bula y Vázquez. She became a training ship for midshipmen in February 1883, with her armament becoming twenty-four 200-millimetre (7.9 in) smoothbore guns, two Hontoria 90-millimetre (3.5 in) guns, two Hontoria 70-millimetre (2.8 in) guns, and two machine guns. She made a training cruise to the United Kingdom in April and May 1883 in which she visited Southampton and Portsmouth.

Tasked with transporting the remains of Admiral Casto Méndez Núñez from Ferrol to Cádiz, Lealtad anchored at Vigo on 4 June 1883. There she embarked Méndez Núñez′s remains, joined by a British Royal Navy squadron under the command of Vice-Admiral William Dowell and Rear-Admiral John Wilson consisting of the ironclad armoured frigates HMS Achilles, HMS Agincourt, HMS Minotaur, and HMS Northumberland, the centre battery ironclad HMS Sultan, and the ironclad turret ship HMS Neptune. She disembarked Méndez Núñez′s remains at San Fernando at 08:30 on 16 June 1883, and Méndez Núñez was reburied at the Panteón de Marinos Ilustres (Pantheon of Illustrious Sailors) in Cádiz.

On 22 November 1883 the Imperial German Navy corvette SMS Prinz Adalbert arrived at Valencia with the German Crown Prince Frederick on board, accompanied by the corvette SMS Sofía and the aviso SMS Loreley. The ships of the Training Squadron — Lealtad, Carmén (as Nuestra Señora del Carmén had been renamed), and the armoured frigates Numancia and Vitoria — escorted the German ships. In the summer of 1884, Lealtad was part of a Training Squadron commanded by Contralmirante (Counter Admiral) Francisco de Paula Llanos y Herrera when King Alfonso XII and Queen Maria Christina embarked on Vitoria on 19 August 1884 for a voyage to La Coruña and Ferrol escorted by Numancia, Carmén, Lealtad, and the gunboat Paz. The unprotected cruiser Navarra joined the squadron at Ferrol, and they continued the journey along the coast of Spain until Alfonso XII and Maria Christina disembarked at Vigo on 25 August 1884.

At the beginning of 1885, the screw frigate Gerona replaced Lealtad as the midshipmen training ship. Although tensions with the German Empire over the Carolines Question — the status of the Caroline Islands in the Spanish East Indies in the Pacific Ocean — had peaked in 1885, Spanish concerns over possible German aggression continued well into 1886. As a result, the Training Squadron — made up of Lealtad, Numancia, and Vitoria — anchored at Mahón on Menorca in the Balearic Islands on 18 March 1886 with orders to prepare to deploy to the Pacific Ocean to defend the Carolines. Shortly afterwards, Navarra and the screw frigate Almansa joined them, and on 24 October the Ministry of the Navy ordered additional ships to reinforce the squadron out of a fear that Germany would attack the Balearic Islands and use them as bargaining chips in peace talks after a possible war. In the end, no conflict broke out between the countries.

In 1890, Lealtad was awaiting careening. She was decommissioned in 1893 and thereafter was hulked at Cartagena to serve as a veterans' asylum until she was sold for scrapping in 1897.
