= Spanish cruiser Castilla =

Spanish cruiser of 1882/1886–1898

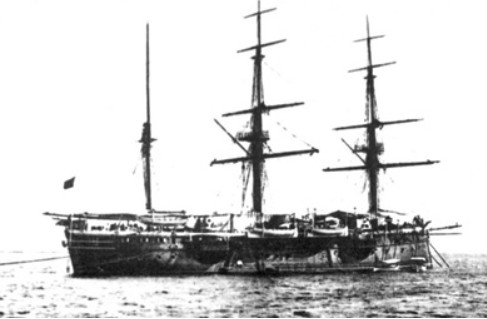

History

Spain
- Name: Castilla
- Namesake: Castile, an historical region of Spain
- Ordered: 1869
- Builder: Arsenal de La Carraca, San Fernando, Spain
- Laid down: May 1869
- Launched: August 1881 or 9 September 1881 (see text)
- Completed: 1881 or 1886 {see text)
- Commissioned: 1882 or 1886 {see text)
- Fate: Sunk 1 May 1898

General characteristics
- Class & type: Aragon-class unprotected cruiser
- Displacement: 3,289 tons
- Length: 236 ft 0 in (71.93 m)
- Beam: 44 ft 0 in (13.41 m)
- Draft: 23 ft 6 in (7.16 m) maximum
- Installed power: 1,400 ihp (1,000 kW)
- Propulsion: 1-shaft, 3-cylinder, horizontal compound
- Sail plan: Barque-rigged
- Speed: 14 knots (26 km/h; 16 mph)
- Complement: 392 officers and enlisted
- Armament: As completed, included 8 x 8 in (203 mm) 180-pounder rifled muzzle-loading guns; By 1885: 4 × 5.9 in (150 mm) guns; 2 × 4.7 in (119 mm) breech-loading guns; 2 × 87 mm guns; 4 × 75 mm guns; 10 × machine guns; 2 × 14 in (356 mm) torpedo tubes
- Notes: 460 tons of coal (normal)

Castilla was an Aragon-class unprotected cruiser of the Spanish Navy that fought in the Battle of Manila Bay during the Spanish–American War. Originally designed as an armored corvette with a central battery ironclad design, she instead was completed as an unprotected cruiser or wooden corvette. After early service in the Mediterranean Sea, she spent the rest of her career in the Philippine Islands. She took part in combat operations during the first two years of the Philippine Revolution in 1896–1897. When the Spanish–American War broke out 1898, she was part of the squadron of Contralmirante (Counter Admiral) Patricio Montojo y Pasarón in Manila Bay and was sunk in the Battle of Manila Bay.

== Technical characteristics ==
In 1869, the Provisional Government of Spain ordered the three Aragon-class ships as armored corvettes, intended for colonial service in the Spanish Empire. Accordingly, Castilla′s construction began in 1869 with the intention of completing her to a central battery ironclad design with 890 tons of armor and 500 millimetres (19.7 in) of armor at the waterline. In either 1870 or 1877, according to different sources, her design was changed to that of an unprotected cruiser or wooden corvette, a change which left her with an overly heavy wooden hull that was obsolescent by the time she was launched in 1881.

Castilla had a ram bow and two funnels and was rigged as a barque. Her machinery was manufactured at the Reales Astilleros de Esteiro at Ferrol, Spain. The original main battery of Armstrong-built 8-inch (203 mm) guns was obsolescent when she was completed, and were quickly replaced with more modern Krupp-built guns, with the 5.9-inch (150 mm) guns mounted in sponsons. Designed for colonial service, including intercepting contraband and pirates, she was never intended to fight a battle against heavily armed, armored, steel-hulled warships like she faced in the Battle of Manila Bay.

== Construction and commissioning ==
Castilla was laid down in May 1869 at the Arsenal de La Carraca in San Fernando, Spain. Sources give different accounts of her construction. According to one, political events thereafter delayed her construction until 1876, Minister of the Navy Vicealmirante (Vice Admiral) Juan Bautista Antequera y Bobadilla ordered her to be completed as a wooden warship in 1877, and she was completed in 1881 and commissioned in 1882. Another source claims that the decision to complete her as a wooden, rather than ironclad, warship was made in 1870 and that she was launched in August 1881 and completed in 1882. Still another states that her construction was suspended in 1873 and delayed by political events before resuming in January 1877, after which she was launched on 9 September 1881, that her fitting-out then suffered from several years of delays, and that as a result she was not completed and commissioned until 1886, beginning operations in August 1886.

== Operational history ==
=== 1886–1897 ===
After commissioning, Castilla was assigned to the Training Squadron. Although tensions with the German Empire over Carolines Question — the status of the Caroline Islands in the Spanish East Indies in the Pacific Ocean — had peaked in 1885, Spanish concerns over possible German aggression in the Caroline Islands continued well into 1886, and she was among Spanish warships receiving orders on 24 October 1886 to prepare for action, but in the end no armed conflict broke out.

Ordered in mid-January 1887 to undertake a voyage to visit several foreign ports on the Mediterranean Sea, the Training Squadron — consisting of the armored frigate Numancia (serving as the squadron's flagship), the screw frigate Gerona, and Castilla — anchored at Genoa, Italy, from 24 January to 2 February, then proceeded to La Spezia, Italy. Planned visits to ports in Sicily were canceled due to an outbreak of cholera in Catania, but the squadron continued its voyage by visiting Algiers and other ports in North Africa before concluding the cruise.

On 25 August 1887, Queen Regent Maria Christina, Minister of the Navy Rafael Rodríguez de Arias Villavicencio, and President of the Council of Ministers Práxedes Mateo Sagasta boarded Castilla at San Sebastián, Spain. From Castilla, the dignitaries observed maneuvers by the new torpedo boat destroyer Destructor.

Castilla and her sister ship Navarra got underway from San Sebastián on 4 September 1887 to escort the steamship Ferrolano as Ferrolano transported Queen Maria Christina for a visit to Getaria (Spanish: Guetaria), Spain. The ships returned to San Sebastián that night.

Castilla and Navarra visited Tangier in Morocco in October 1887. Castilla returned to Tangier on 10 February 1888 to embark an embassy from the Sultan of Morocco for transportation to Italy. She departed Tangier on 12 February and proceeded to Naples, Italy, where she arrived on 17 February. The Moroccan diplomats disembarked there and journeyed overland to Rome. Castilla remained at Naples until 10 March, when the Moroccans came back aboard and she got underway for Tangier. A storm forced her to divert to Cartagena, Spain, but after the weather moderated she resumed her voyage to Tangier, which she reached on 19 March 1887.

Castilla was part of a squadron of Spanish Navy ships — which also included Numancia, Navarra, Gerona, Destructor, the screw frigate Blanca, the protected cruisers Isla de Cuba and Isla de Luzón, the gunboats Pilar and Cóndor, and the transport Legazpi — which was at Barcelona, Spain, on 20 May 1888 for the opening of the 1888 Barcelona Universal Exposition, with Castilla serving as the flagship of the Training Squadron's commander, Contralmirante (Counter Admiral) José Carranza y Echevarría. From July to September 1888, the Training Squadron, including Castilla, made a voyage to the main ports of France, Italy, Austria-Hungary, and Greece. During the voyage, Castilla arrived on 27 August at Toulon, France, where on 9 September she, Numancia, and Isla de Luzón attended the delivery of the battleship Pelayo from her builders to the Spanish Navy.

On 10 January 1889, Castilla departed Mahón on Menorca in the Balearic Islands bound for Puente Mayorga in southern Spain, where the disabled screw frigate Carmén was awaiting assistance. She took Carmén under tow on the evening of 14 January and the two ships arrived in Cádiz Bay on the morning of 15 January. On 23 March 1889, Castilla transported the new Spanish representative to the Sultan of Morocco, Undersecretary of State Francisco Rafael Figueras, from Cádiz to Tangier.

In September 1889, fighting broke out in Morocco that culminated in a Moroccan attack on the Spanish gunboat Cocodrilo. On 23 September the Training Squadron — consisting of Castilla, Pelayo, and Numancia — proceeded from Cádiz to Al Hoceima (known to the Spanish as Alhucemas) in Morocco, where it rendezvoused with Gerona and Isla de Luzón. Meanwhile Isla de Cuba headed for Tangier and Navarra got underway from Tangier bound for Al Hoceima carrying emissaries from the Sultan of Morocco to free prisoners from the captured vessel Miguel y Teresa.

On 7 March 1890, Capitán de navío (Ship-of-the-Line Captain) Manuel de la Cámara — a future almirante (admiral) — took command of the Philippine Division, a naval force composed of Castilla and the unprotected cruisers Don Antonio de Ulloa and Don Juan de Austria designated to reinforce the Spanish Navy′s Asiatic Squadron in the Philippines. The division departed Cádiz on 9 April 1890. Transiting the Mediterranean Sea, Suez Canal, and Indian Ocean, the division encountered rough weather in the Gulf of Lyons at the beginning of its voyage, but not thereafter. It called at Barcelona, Port Said, Suez, Aden, and Colombo before arriving at Singapore on 2 June 1890. The three cruisers resumed their voyage the next day and arrived at Manila on 17 June 1890. The voyage marked the first time that Castilla had ever ventured beyond the waters of the Mediterranean. In the Philippines, the division became known as the "Black Squadron" because its ships were painted black instead of the regulation white for colonial vessels in the Spanish Empire, as other Asiatic Squadron ships were. Although a captain, Cámara commanded the division with the title of "commodore" of the division until December 1890, when illness forced him to relinquish command.

After Cámara′s departure, Castilla stayed on in the Philippines. In June 1893, she visited Yokohama, Japan. During the first two years of the Philippine Revolution in 1896–1897, referred to by the Spaniards as the "Tagalog Revolt," Castilla patrolled to intercept contraband destined for the Philippine insurgents and supported Spanish Army forces fighting ashore in Cavite Province on Luzon, including in several operations in August 1896.

=== Spanish-American War ===
When the Spanish–American War broke out on 25 April 1898 — with the United States stipulating that its declaration of war was retroactive to 21 April — Castilla was part of the squadron of Contralmirante (Counter Admiral) Patricio Montojo y Pasarón in Manila Bay. At 11:00 on 25 April, Castilla and five other ships of the squadron set out for Subic Bay, where Montojo hoped to take advantage of minefields and shore batteries in the likely event of an attack by United States Navy forces on his squadron. During the voyage, Castilla began to take on water through her propeller shaft housing. Her machinery and boilers had been in such poor shape that she was capable only of low speed already, and the only method of stopping the flooding—plugging the hole with concrete—immobilized her propeller shaft, leaving her to rely on sails or towing for propulsion. Montojo's flagship, the unprotected cruiser Reina Cristina, took her under tow.

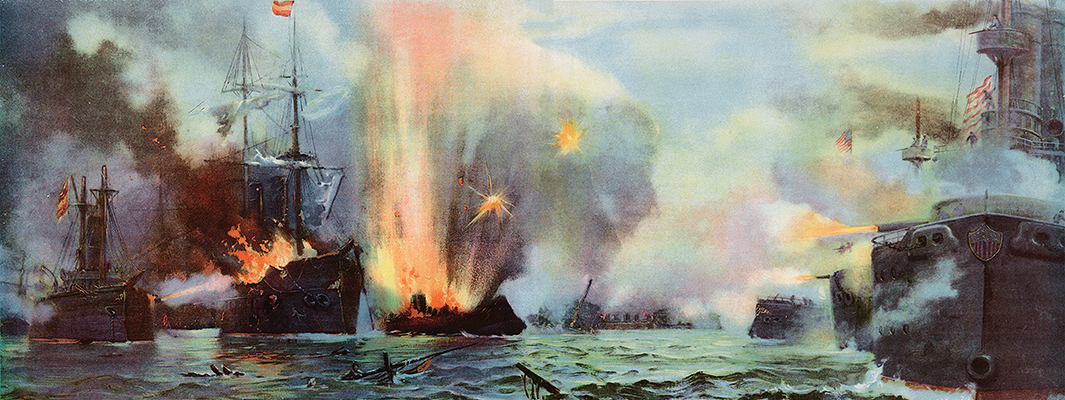
In this 1898 painting of the Battle of Manila Bay by J. G. Tyler, Castilla is the second ship from the left.

Arriving at Subic Bay, Montojo found that few of the mines had been laid and the shore batteries had not yet been mounted. At 1030 hours on 29 April 1898, Montojo's ships departed Subic Bay to return to Manila Bay, where shore batteries could support Montojo's squadron and where the shallow water might reduce the loss of life if the Spanish ships were sunk; Castilla again was towed by Reina Cristina on this return voyage. The squadron anchored later that day in Cañacao Bay off Sangley Point, in the lee of the Cavite Peninsula, about 8 miles (13 km) southeast of Manila. Don Juan de Austria made a quick trip to Manila to procure small craft, such as lighters, small boats, and barges, to be tied up alongside Castilla to protect her wooden hull from hostile gunfire. Castilla also was sandbagged along the side exposed to enemy fire.

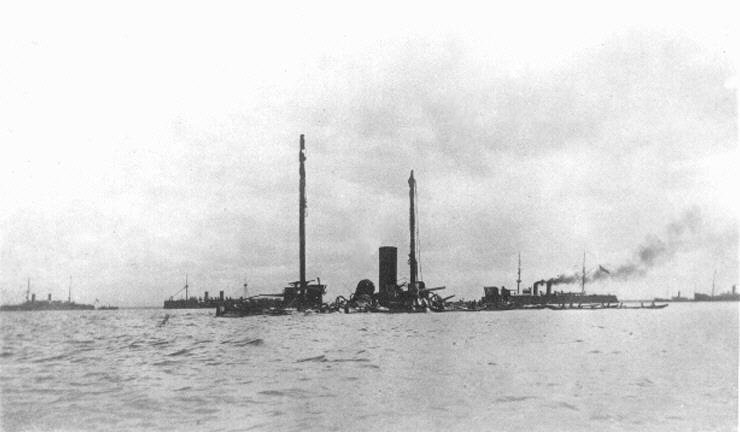
The wreck of Castilla, with Dewey's squadron and merchant ships in the background.

At 04:00 on 1 May 1898, Montojo signaled the anchored squadron to prepare for imminent action. The U.S. Navy's Asiatic Squadron under Commodore George Dewey was sighted approaching the anchorage at 04:45. Castilla and the other Spanish ships opened fire at 05:20, beginning the Battle of Manila Bay, the first major action of the Spanish–American War.

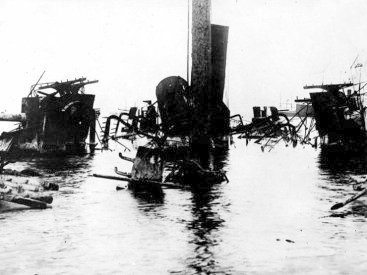
A view aboard the wreck of Castilla.

Dewey's squadron made a series of slow firing passes at the Spanish squadron. Still unable to get underway, Castilla had to fight it out at anchor. She had not been repainted, and still sported her peacetime white sides and yellow funnels, making her an easy and attractive target for American gunners. At 06:30, Castilla had one 5.9-inch (150 mm) and one 4.7-inch (119 mm) gun disabled by an American shell hit, which also killed several of her crew. American shellfire cut her anchor cables, and she drifted to expose her unprotected side to Dewey's squadron. Three 8-inch (203 mm) hits started a large fire, which by 07:15 had begun to destroy her deck, and she was ordered abandoned at 08:30; Don Juan de Austria rendered assistance to Castilla under enemy fire.

Hit by five 8-inch (203 mm) and 6-inch (152 mm), twelve 5-inch (127 mm), and about 33 smaller shells, Castilla soon sank, a total loss, having suffered 23 to 25 men killed and 80 wounded during the battle.

== Trophy cannon ==
In 1902, one of the breech-loading guns from Castilla was presented by Oscar F. Williams, U.S. Consul at Manila, to the city of Rochester, New York. It is currently located in Highland Park in Rochester. The Vermont State House features a pair of the same cannon, with an almost identical plaque, as decoration on the front lawn. The only difference in the plaque is the parts pertaining to the locality the gun was presented to.

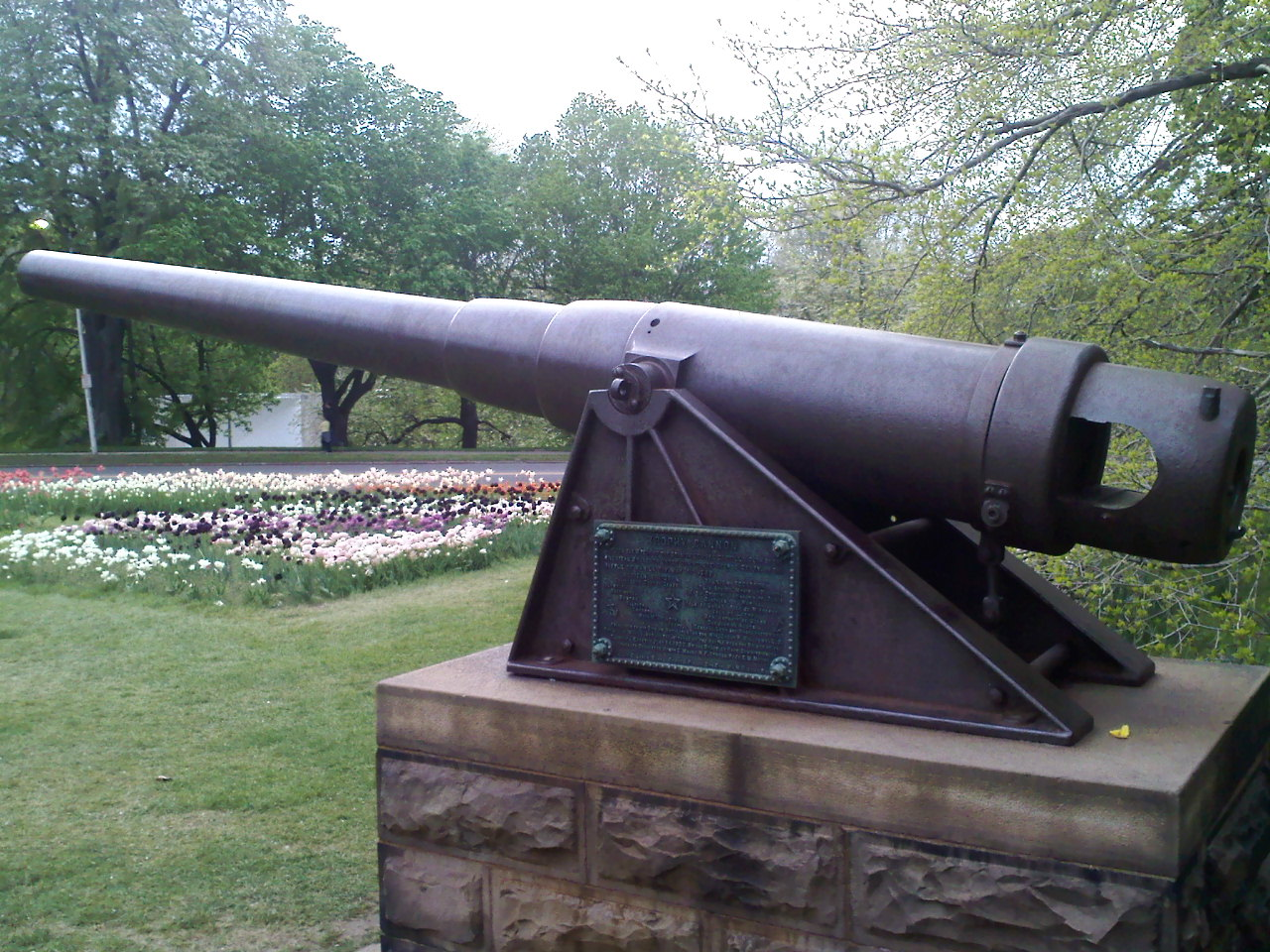
Breech-loading trophy cannon from Castilla.

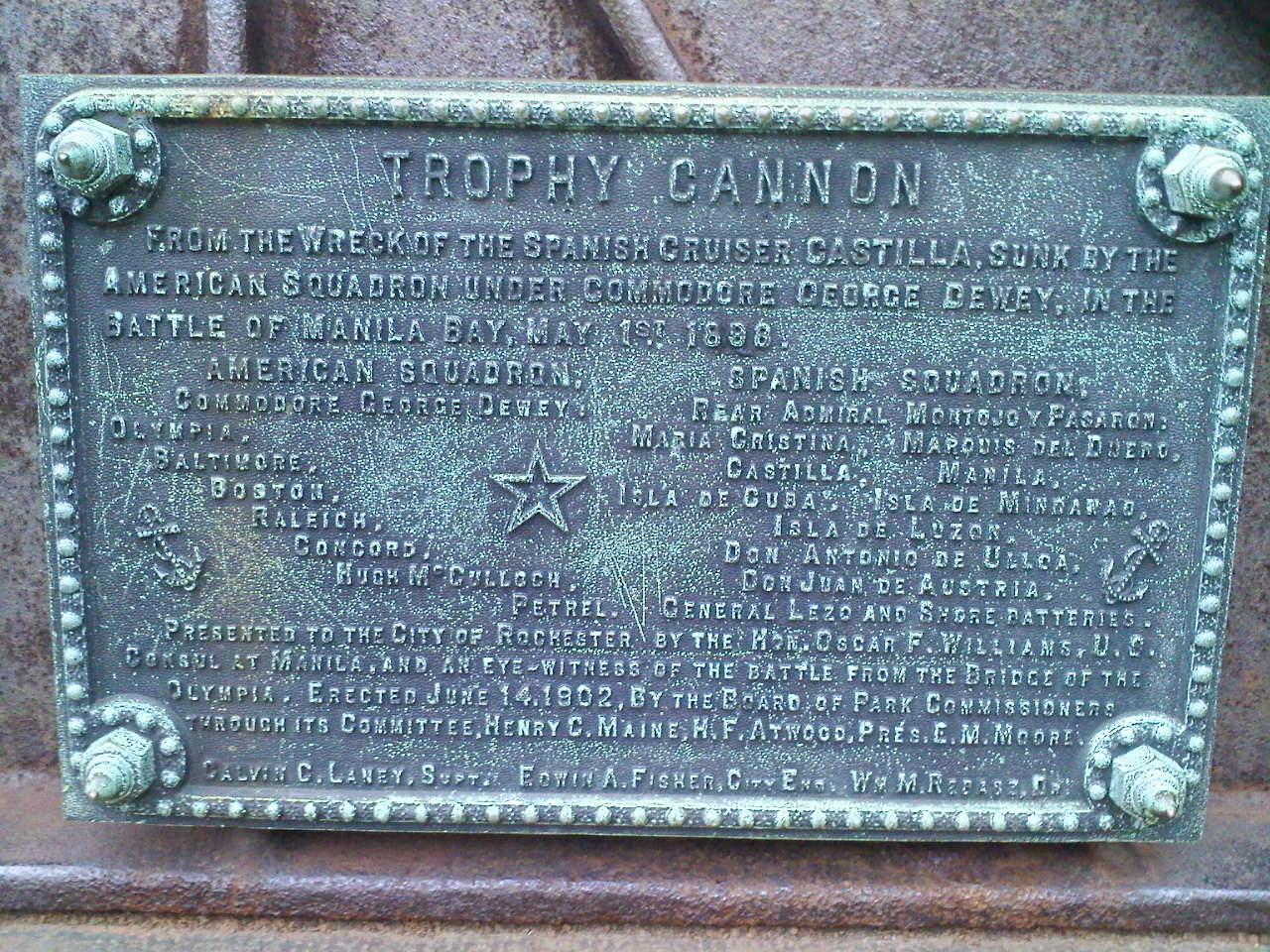
Close-up of the trophy cannon's plaque.

== See also ==
- Patricio Montojo y Pasaron
