= Spanish ironclad Vitoria =

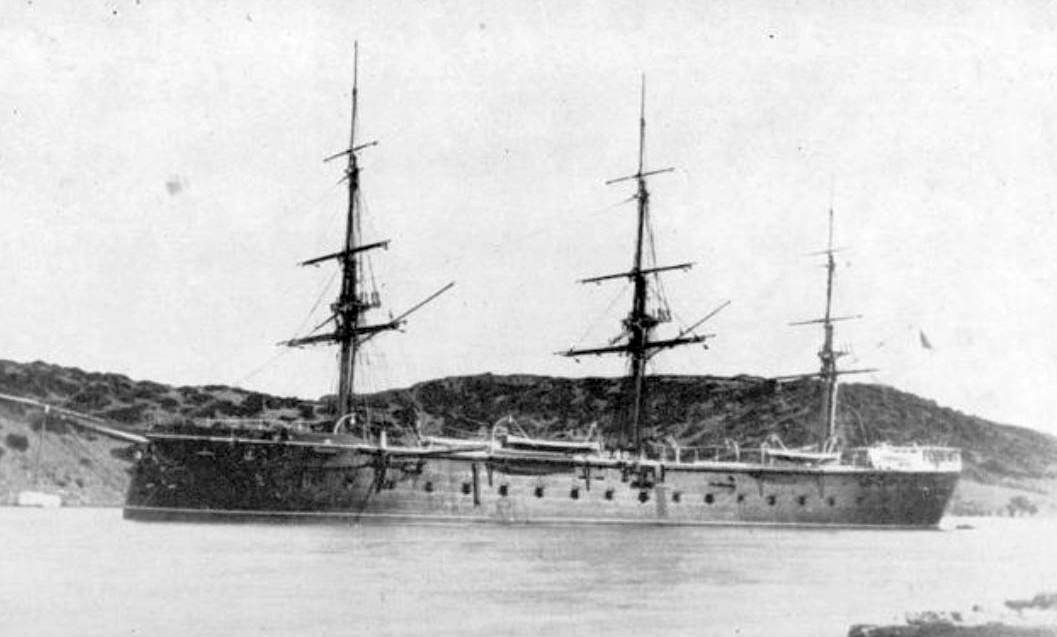
- Vitoria in Mahón, c. 1885

History

Spain
- Name: Vitoria
- Namesake: Battle of Vitoria
- Ordered: 11 December 1862
- Builder: Thames Ironworks, Blackwall, London, United Kingdom
- Cost: 8,168,120.17 pesetas
- Laid down: 15 January 1863
- Launched: 4 November 1865
- Completed: January or May 1867 (see text)
- Acquired: November 1867 (delivered to Spanish Navy)
- Commissioned: February 1868
- Renamed: Victoria ca. 30 December 1871
- Renamed: Vitoria ca. February 1873
- Decommissioned: 27 February 1874
- Recommissioned: ca. spring 1875
- Decommissioned: 1887
- Recommissioned: 1890
- Decommissioned: 1908
- Stricken: 1912
- Fate: Scrapped 1912
- Notes: Served Canton of Cartagena during 1873; Hulked mid-1903

General characteristics (as built)
- Type: Broadside ironclad
- Displacement: 7,250 t (7,140 long tons)
- Length: 96.8 m (317 ft 7 in)
- Beam: 17.3 m (56 ft 9 in)
- Draft: 7.7 m (25 ft)
- Installed power: 8 boilers; 4,500 ihp (3,400 kW)
- Propulsion: 1 shaft, 1 trunk steam engine
- Sail plan: Ship rig
- Speed: about 14 knots (26 km/h; 16 mph)
- Range: 2,400 nmi (4,400 km; 2,800 mi) at 10 knots (19 km/h; 12 mph)
- Complement: 561
- Armament: As built: 4 × 9 in (229 mm) 250-pounder (113 kg) rifled muzzle-loader (RML) guns; 3 x 8 in (203 mm) 180-pounder (81.6 kg) RML guns; 14 x 200 mm (7.9 in) Rivera smoothbore guns; 2 x 150 mm (5.9 in) howitzers (for boats); 2 x 120 mm (4.7 in) rifled guns (for boats); 2 x 80 mm (3.1 in) rifled guns (for boats); 1870; 4 × 9 in (229 mm) 250-pounder (113 kg) rifled muzzle-loader (RML) guns; 3 x 8 in (203 mm) 180-pounder (81.6 kg) RML guns; 12 x 160 mm (6.3 in) Palliser rifled guns; 2 x 150 mm (5.9 in) howitzers (for boats); 2 x 120 mm (4.7 in) rifled guns (for boats); 2 x 80 mm (3.1 in) rifled guns (for boats); 1875; 4 × 220 mm (9 in) 250-pounder (113 kg) Woolwich guns; 3 x 8 in (203 mm) 180-pounder (81.6 kg) Woolwich guns; 12 x 160 mm (6.3 in) Palliser rifled guns; 1880; 8 × 9 in (229 mm) 250-pounder (113 kg) rifled muzzle-loader (RML) guns; 3 x 8 in (203 mm) 180-pounder (81.6 kg) Woolwich guns; 6 x 80 mm (3.1 in) rifled guns (for boats); "A few years later": 8 × 9 in (229 mm) 250-pounder (113 kg) rifled muzzle-loader (RML) guns; 2 x 8 in (203 mm) 180-pounder (81.6 kg) Woolwich guns; 1 x 200 mm (7.9 in) 180-pounder (81.6 kg) Woolwich guns; 2 x 90 mm (3.5 in) Hontoria guns; 2 x 70 mm (2.8 in) Hontoria guns; 8 x machine guns; 2 x torpedo tubes; 1898: 4 x 200 mm (7.9 in) Hontoria guns; 4 x 160 mm (6.3 in) Hontoria guns; 12 × 150 mm (5.9 in) Škoda quick-firing guns; 8 × 57 mm (2.2 in) Nordenfelt guns; 4 × 47 mm (1.9 in) Škoda guns; 4 x 37 mm (1.5 in) Maxim guns; 2 x 75 mm (3.0 in) guns (for boats); 2 x Hotchkiss machine guns (for boats); 1903: 4 x 200 mm (7.9 in) Hontoria guns; 4 x 160 mm (6.3 in) Hontoria guns; 8 × 150 mm (5.9 in) Škoda quick-firing guns; 8 × 57 mm (2.2 in) Nordenfelt guns; 4 × 47 mm (1.9 in) Škoda guns; 4 x 37 mm (1.5 in) Maxim guns; 2 x 75 mm (3.0 in) guns (for boats); 2 x Hotchkiss machine guns (for boats)
- Armor: Belt: 140 mm (5.5 in); Battery: 120 mm (4.7 in); Barbettes: 114 mm (4.5 in)

Vitoria was an iron-hulled Spanish Navy armored frigate commissioned in 1868. She took part on the rebel side in the Glorious Revolution of 1868. She participated on both sides during the Cantonal Rebellion of 1873–1874, first on the side of the Canton of Cartagena and then, after her crew surrendered to neutral warships, on the side of the central government of the First Spanish Republic. During the rebellion, she played a major role on the central government side in the Battle of Portmán in 1873. Vitoria bombarded rebel towns in northern Spain in 1875 during the Third Carlist War. She was reconstructed in the late 1890s and reclassified as a coast defense ship, serving as such during the Spanish-American War in 1898. She was hulked in 1903 and thereafter hosted training activities until 1907. She was decommissioned in 1908 and stricken and scrapped in 1912.

Vitoria was named after the Battle of Vitoria, a victory by a British, Portuguese and Spanish army against French forces on 21 June 1813 during the Napoleonic Wars. After the accession of King Amadeo I on 30 December 1871, she was renamed Victoria, but she reverted to her original name Vitoria when he abdicated in February 1873.

== Design and description ==
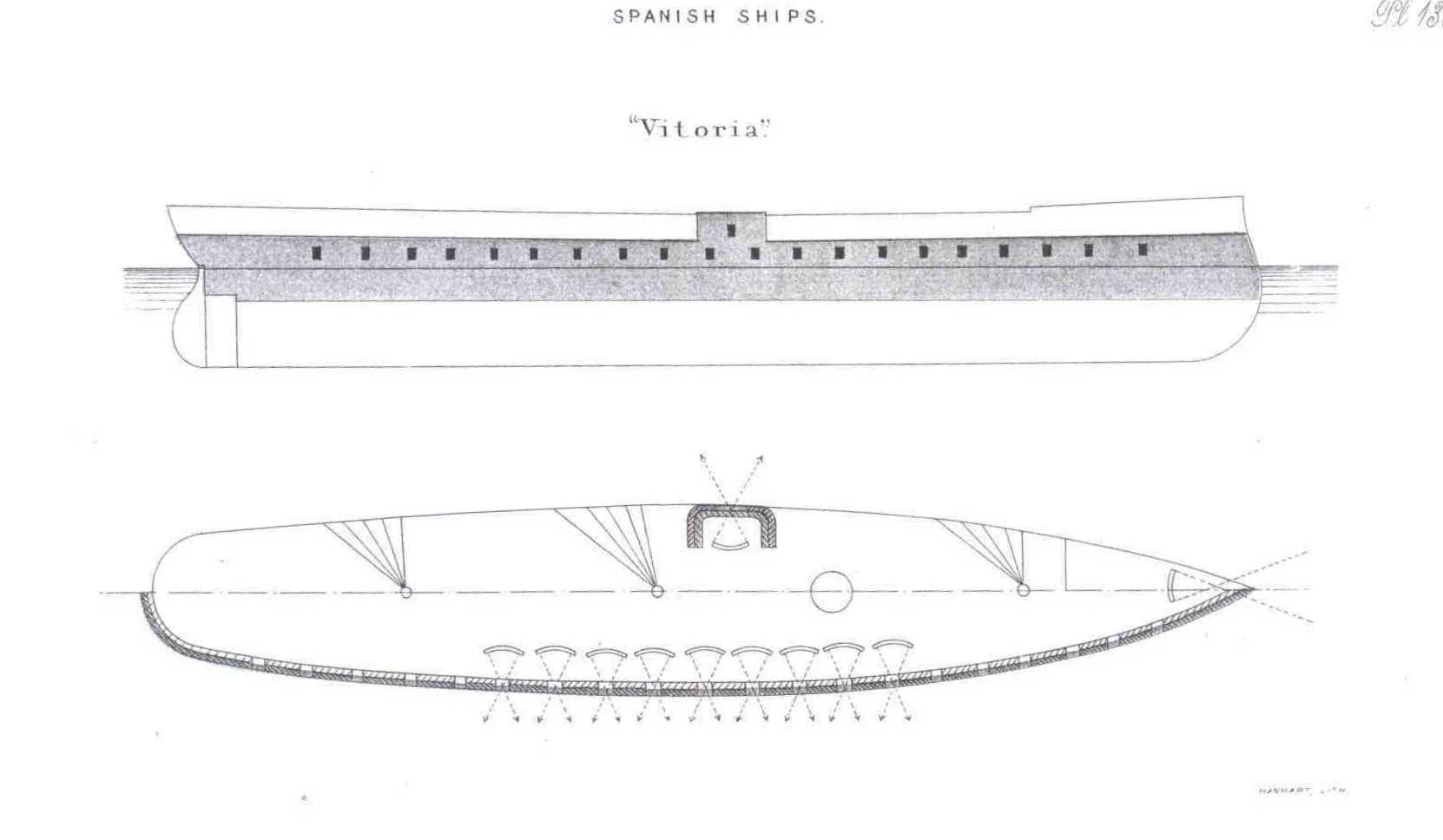
Plan and right-elevation drawing of Vitoria; the shaded areas show armor protection

Vitoria was 96.8 meters (317 ft 7 in) long at the waterline, had a beam of 17.3 meters (56 ft 9 in) and a draft of 7.7 meters (25 ft 3 in). She displaced 7,250 metric tons (7,135 long tons). Her crew consisted of 561 officers and enlisted men.

The ship was fitted with a John Penn and Sons trunk steam engine that drove the single propeller shaft using steam provided by eight boilers. The engines were rated at a total of 1,000 nominal horsepower or 4,500 indicated horsepower (3,400 kW), and gave Vitoria a speed of 14 knots (26 km/h; 16 mph) The ironclad carried a maximum of 875 metric tons (861 long tons) of coal that gave her a range of 2,400 nautical miles (4,400 km; 2,800 mi) at 10 knots (19 km/h; 12 mph). She was fitted with a three-masted ship rig with a sail area of around 1,800–1,900 square meters (19,000–20,000 sq ft).

The frigate's main battery was originally intended to consist of thirty 68-pounder gun smoothbore guns mounted on the broadside, but she was fitted with four Armstrong nine-inch (229 mm) and three Armstrong eight-inch (203 mm) rifled muzzle-loading guns, and fourteen Trubia 160-millimeter (6.3 in) smoothbore guns. The nine-inch and 160-millimeter guns were situated on the gun deck while the eight-inch guns were positioned on the main deck, one on each broadside, and another in the forecastle as the forward chase gun. By 1883, the Trubia guns had been replaced by four more nine-inch guns. When Vitoria was refitted in France in 1896–1898, her armament was changed to six Hontoria 160 mm and eight Canet 140-millimeter (5.5 in) rifled breech-loading guns and a pair of 354-millimeter (14 in) torpedo tubes.

Vitoria had a complete wrought iron waterline belt of 140-millimetre (5.5 in) armor plates. Above the belt, the guns, except for the chase gun, were protected by 130 millimeters (5.1 in) of armor. The ends of the ship and the deck were unarmored.

== Construction and commissioning ==
The Spanish Ministry of the Navy authorized the construction in the United Kingdom of two armoured frigates, Vitoria and Sagunto, on 14 July 1862. The ministry ordered Vitoria from Thames Iron Works at Blackwall, London, England on 11 December 1862. She was laid down on 15 January 1863 and launched on 4 November 1865. She was completed in January or May 1867, according to different sources, and delivered to the Spanish Navy in November 1867. Her construction cost was 8,168,120.17 pesetas.

According to one source, Vitoria was commissioned in February 1868. However, Spain was fighting the Chincha Islands War with Bolivia, Chile, Ecuador, and Peru at the time, and the United Kingdom, as a neutral country, embargoed her, delaying her departure for Spain. She remained in the United Kingdom until the United Kingdom, Spain, and Chile — which was awaiting the delivery from England of the screw corvettes Chacabuco and O'Higgins for the Chilean Navy — worked out an agreement allowing Vitoria to make her delivery voyage.

== Service history ==
=== 1868–1873 ===
Vitoria finally departed London on 16 August 1868 and arrived at Ferrol, Spain, on 18 August. When the Glorious Revolution against the rule of Queen Isabella II broke out on 19 September 1868, Vitoria sided with the rebel forces led by Juan Bautista Topete and Juan Prim. On 23 September 1868, she captured the paddle gunboat Colón, which had aboard the captain general of the Department of Ferrol, Admiral Francisco de Paula Pavía, who was loyal to Isabella II. She disembarked him in La Coruña. The revolution ended on 27 September 1868 in the deposition of Isabella II and the proclamation of a Provisional Government.

In June 1869, Vitoria was part of the Mediterranean Squadron, with also included the armoured frigates Numancia and Zaragoza, the screw frigates Asturias and Villa de Madrid, and several smaller vessels. In 1870, her 200-millimetre (7.9 in) Rivera cannons were replaced by twelve 200-millimetre (7.9 in) rifled and cased Palliser guns.

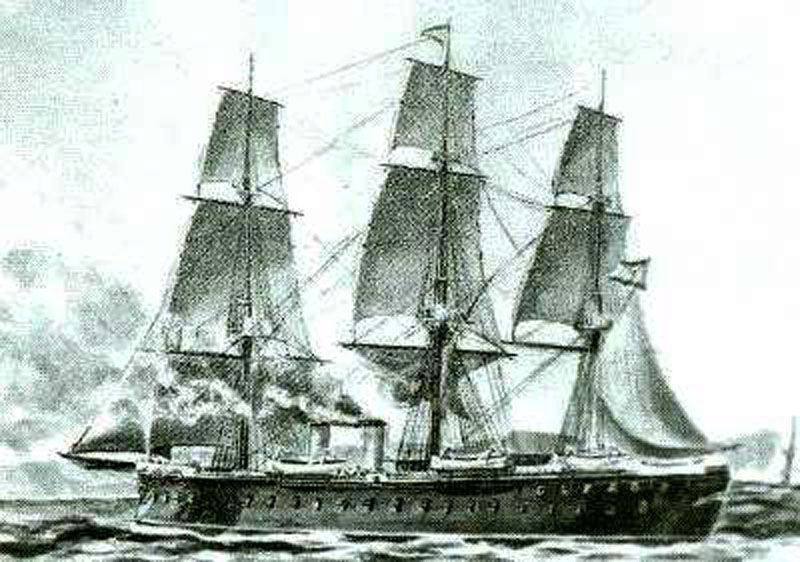
An engraving of Vitoria, before 1870.

On 24 November 1870 at Cartagena, Spain, Minister of the Navy José María Beránger Ruiz de Apodaca and President of the Congress of Deputies Manuel Ruiz Zorrilla came aboard Villa de Madrid, the flagship of Contraalmirante (Counter Admiral) José Ignacio Rodríguez de Arias, who commanded a squadron that also included Vitoria and Numancia. The three ships departed Cartagena on 26 November 1870 and steamed in company to La Spezia, Italy, where the Spanish dignitaries offered the Spanish crown to Prince Amadeo of Savoy. Amadeo boarded Numancia and the Spanish ships returned to Spain, arriving at Cartagena on 30 December 1870. Upon Amadeo's accession to the throne, Vitoria′s name was changed to Victoria. She remained in the Mediterranean Squadron until the Cantonal Rebellion broke out in 1873.

King Amadeo I abdicated and the First Spanish Republic was proclaimed in February 1873. Victoria returned to her original name, Vitoria after the king's abdication.

=== Cantonal Rebellion ===
==== Cantonal service ====
On 12 July 1873 the Canton of Cartagena declared its independence from the First Spanish Republic, beginning the Cantonal Rebellion. The central government regarded the Cantonalists as separatists, and combat broke out between it and the Cantonalists. Vitoria was at Cartagena at the time and came under Cantonalist control. On 20 July, the central government of the First Spanish Republic declared that ships flying the red flag of the Canton were pirates, and other naval powers made similar declarations and sent warships to Spanish waters to protect their interests.

On 22 July, Vitoria captured the central government paddle gunboat Vigilante. Vitoria and Vigilante then steamed to Alicante and persuaded the city government to join the rebels. However, the city government returned its loyalty to the central government when the two Cantonalist ships departed later the same day.

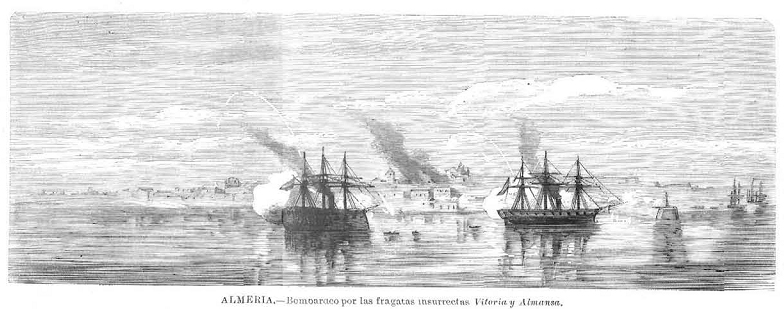
Vitoria (left) and Almansa bombard Almería on 30 July 1873. (Illustration from La Ilustración Española y Americana, 8 August 1873.)

Vitoria got underway from Cartagena on the evening of 28 July 1873 with the screw frigate Almansa, which also had joined the Cantonalists, to steam along the coast of Spain to recruit Spaniards to the Cantonalist cause and to raise money for the Canton from coastal cities. The Cantonal squadron lacked naval officers, and the ships were under the command of a cavalry general, Juan Contreras y Román, commander of the Canton's army, who was aboard Vitoria. The two ships arrived off Almería early on the morning of 29 July, and after negotiations between Contreras and local officials that lasted all day, Contreras informed the officials that if they did not pay him US$100,000 and give him the city's books and all the money in its treasury, his ships would destroy the town at daybreak on 30 July. In return, the local authorities informed him that they would not comply and would not allow him to disembark.

At 08:30 on 30 July, a messenger from the ships came ashore to deliver a notice to the city's consular officials that the ships would open fire in an hour, but he was unsuccessful. At 10:00, Almansa provided covering fire for four armed launches attempting to land Cantonalist troops, but rifle fire from shore drove off the launches without a landing, reportedly with eight men killed and 16 wounded aboard the launches. Vitoria and Almansa then fired about a dozen 100-pound (45 kg) projectiles at the city before hoisting a white flag of truce. When the city's forces hoisted a black flag in response, the ships resumed fire, this time with 200-pound (91 kg) projectiles. With occasional lulls, the ships continued firing until 16:30. Sometime between 18:30 and 19:00, they weighed anchor and headed west. Vitoria and Almansa next stopped at Motril, where they extorted a payment of US$12,000 to be paid to them at Málaga. They then headed for Málaga.

Learning of the incident at Almería, the German commander of the international squadron off Spain, Reinhold von Werner, sent his flagship, the Imperial German Navy armored frigate SMS Friedrich Carl, and the British Royal Navy battleship HMS Swiftsure to intervene. Before Vitoria and Almansa could reach Málaga, Friedrich Carl and Swiftsure intercepted them on 1 August 1873. The wooden Almansa, with Contreras aboard, stood little chance against the two armored ships, and after a brief exchange of gunfire, the two Cantonalist ships surrendered to avoid Contreras and Almansa′s 400-man crew being killed or injured. Facing little opposition from the Cantonalist crews, Swiftsure and Friedrich Carl detained the two ships without prior approval from London or Berlin. Swiftsure and Friedrich Carl officially took custody of Vitoria and Almansa as pirate ships on 2 August. After laborious negotiations, Werner turned over the two Spanish ships to Royal Navy Vice-Admiral Hastings Yelverton, who in turn sent them to Gibraltar, where the British returned them to the Spanish central government on 26 September 1873. The Spanish central government incorporated them into its squadron under the command of Contralmirante (Counter Admiral) Miguel Lobo y Malagamba, who made Vitoria his flagship.

==== Central government service ====
The central government squadron, composed of Vitoria, Almansa, the screw frigates Carmén and Navas de Tolosa, the paddle gunboats Colón and Ciudad de Cádiz, the screw corvette Diana, and the screw schooner Prosperidad, got underway from Gibraltar bound for Cartagena on 5 October 1873. News of the passage of this squadron through Almería reached Cartagena on 9 October, and the Cantonalist forces made plans to attack it. Contreras took command of the Canton's squadron, which consisted of Numancia, the armoured corvette Méndez Núñez, the armoured frigate Tetuán, and the paddle gunboat Despertador del Cantón (formerly named Fernando el Católico in Spanish Navy service).

On 10 October 1873, the central government squadron arrived off Cartagena to establish a blockade. During the evening of 10 October, Lobo kept his ships just outside Cartagena's harbor off of Escombreras, an islet at the mouth of the harbor. Later, during the night of 10–11 October, he ordered his ships to raise sail, probably to economize on their use of coal, and a strong north wind blew his squadron offshore and eastward to a position east of Portmán, Spain.

Flying the same flag of Spain as the central government squadron rather than the red Cantonal flag to avoid international antipiracy actions against its ships, the Cantonal squadron gathered on the morning of 11 October 1873 and got underway for the open sea at 10:30, escorted by five ships of the British Royal Navy, one of the Imperial German Navy, one of the Italian Regia Marina (Royal Navy), and one of the French Navy. At 11:30, the two squadrons sighted one another, with the Cantonal ships 3 nautical miles (5.6 km; 3.5 mi) due south of Cape Agua and Lobo's squadron about 6 nautical miles (11 km; 6.9 mi) to the south in waters east of Cape Negreti, and the Battle of Portmán began. Lobos, whose ships were in no particular order, ordered his squadron to turn to port with Vitoria in the lead. Numancia was faster than the other Cantonal ships, and she charged at Vitoria, racing ahead of the rest of her squadron. After exchanging fire with Vitoria, Numancia cut the central government line between Diana and Almansa, crossed astern of Carmén and Navas de Tolosa, and set off in pursuit of Ciudad de Cádiz. Vitoria broke off to chase Numancia, leaving Almansa, Carmén, and Navas de Tolosa to face the approaching Tetuán and Méndez Núñez.

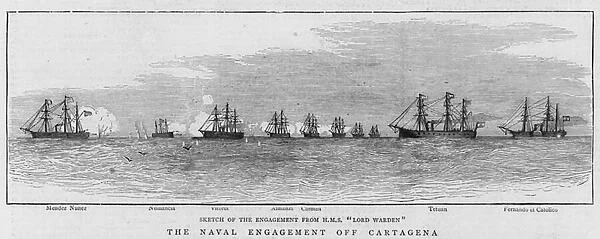
"The Naval Engagement off Cartagena." Drawing of the Battle of Portman published in The Graphic on 25 October 1873. Vitoria is third from left.

After a chase of 4 nautical miles (7.4 km; 4.6 mi), Numancia caught up to Ciudad de Cádiz. Discerning that Numancia was preparing to ram her, Ciudad de Cádiz feinted to starboard, then, when Numancia turned to cut her off, made a sudden turn to port, spoiling the ramming attempt, and cut across Numancia′s stern before Numancia could fire a shot. Ciudad de Cádiz passed south of the rest of the centralist squadron, fortunate to have avoided destruction and escaping with only a single hit to her paddle wheel. Meanwhile, Vitoria opened fire on Numancia with her bow guns and scored a hit on Numancia′s central battery. Numancia responded by returning to Cartagena at full speed to seek shelter under the guns of the coastal fortifications. Vitoria chased Numancia, but lacked the speed to catch her.

Méndez Núñez opened fire on Almansa and Vitoria at very long range at 12:19, and most of the shots did not cover even half the distance to her targets, but she then closed with Carmén, and Méndez Núñez and Carmén scored hits on one another. Méndez Núñez then responded to an order to come to the assistance of Numancia, which was fleeing toward Cartagena with Vitoria in hot pursuit. Almansa, Carmén, and Navas de Tolosa were steering toward Cartagena in the wake of Numancia and Vitoria, putting them on a converging course with Méndez Núñez. They exchanged fire with Méndez Núñez at very long range, but most of the shots were wild and neither side suffered damage. Méndez Núñez and Numancia both reached safety in Cartagena's harbor under cover of the guns of the coastal forts.

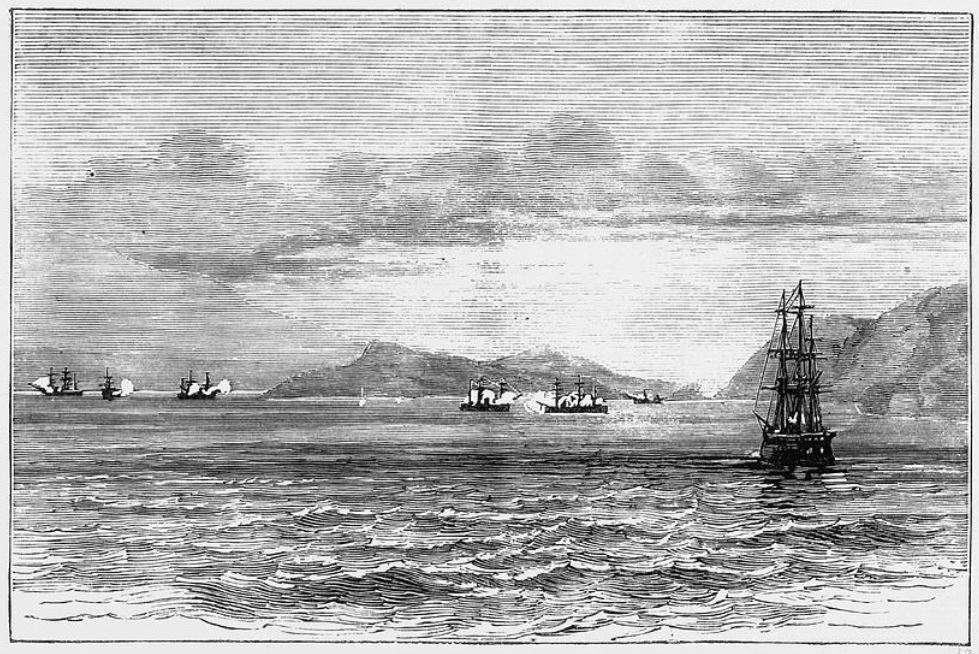
Illustration of Vitoria and Tetuán exchanging broadsides during the Battle of Portmán on 11 October 1873.

At 12:20, Tetuán was about 4 nautical miles (7.4 km; 4.6 mi) south by east of Cape Agua. Steaming very slowly eastward, she crossed the track of Méndez Núñez and exchanged fire with Vitoria. One of Vitoria′s shots landed in the water just under Tetuán′s bows, prompting a crowd of sailors to flee Tetuán′s forecastle. Another of Vitoria′s shots caused Tetuán′s crew to evacuate her bridge. Tetuán nonetheless engaged Almansa, Carmén, and Navas de Tolosa and appeared to hit Almansa six times without receiving any damage in return. Passing Almansa, Carmén, and Navas de Tolosa, she steamed toward Diana, but upon discovering that the other Cantonal ships had fled, she turned around off Cape Negreti and slowly steamed back towards Cartagena, again engaging in succession Carmén, Almansa, and Navas de Tolosa. At 14:00, with Numancia and Méndez Núñez having just escaped into the harbor after avoiding being cut off by Vitoria, Tetuán was just off the entrance to the harbor with Vitoria approaching from the south. Vitoria probably intended to ram Tetuán, but the French armoured corvette Thétis, which had made sail after suffering a mechanical breakdown, inadvertently sailed in between them. With shots from both sides passing through her topsails, Thétis maneuvered to extricate herself from her predicament while Tetuán took advantage of the situation to steam to the west of Vitoria, closer to the guns of Cartagena's coastal forts. By the time Thetis was clear, Tetuán′s port bow was towards Vitoria′s starboard bow. Vitoria was traveling at a greater speed, and she crossed Tetuán′s bow as Tetuán steamed ahead. Both ships then turned to starboard and exchanged starboard broadsides on opposite headings at a range of under 400 yards (370 m). Vitoria scored hits that passed right through Tetuán and then, although the central government claimed she sustained no damage, broke off the engagement, steamed out to sea, and went dead in the water for at least an hour. Meanwhile, Tetuán fired a gun toward Numancia to signal Numancia for support, but Numancia stood out of the harbor for only a few minutes before again withdrawing. Tetuán also gained the safety of the harbor, as did Despertador del Cantón.

The central government squadron had exhausted its ammunition, and at around 15:00 Lobo withdrew it to the east, bringing the battle to a close. In its immediate aftermath, the Cantonalists acknowledged that they had suffered 13 killed in action and 49 wounded, while Lobo claimed that his squadron had suffered no casualties, although one of his frigates reportedly withdrew eastward to "land the sick." Casualty figures eventually were revised to 12 dead and 38 wounded in the Cantonal squadron and 11 dead and 32 wounded on the central government side.

After the battle, the central government squadron tried to blockade Cartagena. However, when the Cantonal squadron sortied again on 13 October 1873, Vitoria had only enough coal for two days' steaming, and the Cantonal squadron, under a new commander, maintained a disciplined formation with Numancia remaining her position in the line despite her higher speed than that of the other two Cantonal frigates. Rather than engage the Cantonalists, Lobo chose to withdraw the central government squadron to the east and then toward Gibraltar, expecting to receive reinforcement of his squadron in the form of the armored frigate Zaragoza and the paddle gunboat Ulloa. This withdrawal led the central government to dismiss Lobo and replace him as commander of the central government squadron with Contralmirante (Counter Admiral) Nicolás Chicarro. Chicarro took command of the central government squadron on 18 October 1873 and reinstated the central government's blockade of Cartagena on 23 October 1873. Like Lobo, however, Chicarro avoided combat, despite the arrival of Zaragoza, which gave him a squadron that included two armored frigates.

On 1 January 1874, Vitoria fired at the British steamer Ellen Constance as Ellen Constance was leaving Cartagena. After Ellen Constance hove to, Vitoria collided with her, and Ellen Constance sank with the loss of three members of her crew. The collision was blamed on poor seamanship by the Spanish sailors and not thought to be a deliberate act.

The Cantonal Rebellion collapsed, and the Canton of Cartagena surrendered to central government forces on 12 January 1874. Cantonal leaders and about 1,750 soldiers, volunteers, and family members who had supported the rebellion boarded Numancia and the steamer Darro to flee Spain. At the time, Chicarro's central government squadron was blockading Cartagena, with Vitoria and the armoured frigate Zaragoza in line ahead, Almansa and Carmén on either side, and Navas de Tolosa in reserve. As Numancia emerged from the harbor on 12 January, Vitoria and Zaragoza opened fire on her. She stopped her engines, which Chicarro interpreted as her surrendering to him, and he ordered his ships to cease fire and reduce speed. However, Numancia suddenly put on full speed, passed across the bows of Vitoria and opened fire, cutting between Carmén and Zaragoza. The central government squadron captured Darro, but Numancia reached the open sea and made for French Algeria with 2,000 people aboard, including 1,635 Cantonalist rebels as passengers. Almansa, Carmén, and Vitoria pursued Numancia, but she escaped and reached Mers El Kébir near Oran on 13 January 1874. Vitoria entered Cartagena in company with other central government ships on 20 January 1874.

=== Third Carlist War ===
Vitoria was decommissioned on 27 February 1874. Her armament underwent modification, giving her four 220-millimetre (8.7 in) 250-pounder (131 kg) Woolwich guns, three 8-inch (203 mm) 180-pounder (81.6 kg) Woolwich guns, and twelve 160-millimetre (6.3 in) Palliser rifled guns. After recommissioning, she served in the Fuerzas Navales del Norte (Northern Naval Forces) from June to September 1875. The Third Carlist War had been raging in the Basque region of northern Spain since 1872, and the Northern Naval Forces squadron was formed to operate in the Cantabrian Sea against Carlist forces. After the squadron's commander, Victoriano Sánchez Barcáiztegui, died aboard the paddle gunboat Colón on 26 May 1875 his successor, Contralmirante (Counter Admiral) José Polo de Bernabé, boarded Colón at Santander on 30 May and on 11 June 1875 hoisted his flag aboard Vitoria, which had just arrived from Ferrol in company with the screw schooners Buenaventura, Favorita, Ligera, and Sirena. Vitoria was the most powerful ship of the Northern Naval Forces.

During the summer of 1875, Vitoria — sometimes alone, sometimes with the monitor Puigcerdá or other warships — bombarded Carlist-controlled cities and towns along Spain's northern coast. She began with bombardments of Motrico on 15, 21, and 23 June, during the last of which return fire by Carlist coastal artillery killed three members of her crew. She bombarded both Bermeo and Mundaca on both 26 June and 7 July and both Lequeitio and Ondárroa on 8 July. After a two-week pause, she resumed bombardment operations, shelling Bermeo, Ondárroa, and Zarauz on 22 July, suffering the loss of her steam launch, destroyed off Zarauz by Carlist coastal artillery. She bombarded Deva, Elanchove, Lequeitio, and Ondárroa on 23 July and Lequeitio, Zarauz, and Ondárroa on 24 July, inflicting light damage on the Carlist coastal batteries at Ondárroa, which suffered one man wounded in the exchange of fire with Vitoria. Vitoria shelled Deva and Motrico on 26 July, Mundaca and Zarauz on 27 July, Lequeitio on 28 July, and Elanchove on 29 July 1875.

Vitoria resumed bombardments in mid-August 1875. She bombarded Lequeitio on 11 August, Elanchove on 12 August, Ondárroa and Zarauz on 13 August, Deva on 14 August, Elanchove on 16 August, Bermeo and Mundaca on 17 August, and Lequeitio on 18 August. After another pause, she returned to bombardment operations in late August 1875, exchanging fire on 30 August at Lequeitio with Carlist coastal artillery which scored several hits on her and wounded three men. On 31 August, she exchanged fire with Carlist artillery at Bermeo, where she sustained slight damage and suffered two men wounded. After bombarding Ondárroa on 1 September, she shelled Elanchove on 2 September, where coastal guns hit her repeatedly but inflicted little damage. She shelled Motrico on 3 September, Zarauz on 4 September, and Ondárroa on 6 September. In her final bombardment, she attacked Zarauz on 7 September 1875 and suffered two men wounded. In all, she fired 1,700 rounds during her coastal bombardment operations and suffered 12 casualties. The war ended on 28 February 1876 in the defeat of the Carlists.

=== Later service ===
Vitoria began an assignment to the Training Squadron in 1877, serving as squadron flagship. On 25 September 1877, King Alfonso XII of Spain began a series of voyages in the Mediterranean Sea aboard Numancia, escorted by Vitoria, the screw frigate Reina Blanca, and the screw corvette Africa. During these voyages, the ships visited Alicante, Valencia, Tarragona, Barcelona, Roses, Mahón, Palma de Mallorca, Santa Pola, Almería, and Málaga.

On 19 August 1879, Vitoria left the Training Squadron, and she inaugurated the La Campana (also called San Luis) dock at Ferrol. At the end of 1880, underwent modifications that left her with eight Armstrong 250-pounder (131 kg) guns in her battery and three 180-pounder (81.5 kg) guns on her deck, as well as six 80-millimetre (3.1 in) rifled guns for disembarkation and use in her boats. A few years later, one of the 180-pounder guns was replaced by a 200-millimetre (7.9 in) Hontoria gun and two 90-millimetre (3.5 in) Hontoria guns, two 70-millimetre (2.8 in) Hontoria guns, eight machine guns, and two torpedo tubes were added.

Vitoria returned to duty with the Training Squadron in 1882. In 1883, she joined Numancia, Carmén, and the screw frigate Lealtad in escorting the Imperial German Navy screw corvettes SMS Prinz Adalbert and SMS Sofía and aviso SMS Loreley as Prinz Adalbert transported the German Crown Prince Frederick on his trip to Valencia, where he arrived on 22 November 1883. On 19 August 1884 King Alfonso XII and Queen Maria Christina embarked on Vitoria for a voyage with the Training Squadron to La Coruña and Ferrol escorted by Numancia, Carmén, Lealtad, and the gunboat Paz. The unprotected cruiser Navarra joined the squadron at Ferrol, and they continued the journey along the coast of Spain until Alfonso XII and Maria Christina disembarked at Vigo on 25 August 1884. Vitoria continued to serve in the Training Squadron until it was dissolved in January 1886.

During tensions with the German Empire over the status of the Caroline Islands in the Spanish East Indies, Vitoria was part of a squadron which also included Lealtad and Numancia that anchored at Mahón on Menorca in the Balearic Islands on 18 March 1886 with orders to prepare to deploy to the Pacific Ocean to defend the Carolines. Shortly afterwards, Almansa and Navarra joined them, and on 24 October the Ministry of the Navy ordered additional ships to reinforce the squadron out of a fear that Germany would attack the Balearic Islands and use them as bargaining chips in peace talks after a possible war. In the end, no conflict broke out between the countries. Vitoria was placed in reserve in 1887.

Vitoria returned to active service in 1890. On 10 October 1892, Vitoria, the battleship Pelayo, and the protected cruiser Reina Regente were among Spanish Navy ships taking part in a naval review at Huelva, Spain, to commemorate the 400th anniversary of Christopher Columbus's discovery of the Americas. After King Alfonso XIII and Queen Regent Maria Christina boarded the unprotected cruiser Conde del Venadito, Conde del Venadito proceeded to Genoa, Italy, escorted by a squadron commanded by Contralmirante (Counter Admiral) Zoilo Sánchez de Ocaña y Vieitiz composed of Vitoria, Pelayo, Reina Regente, the unprotected cruiser Alfonso XII, and the gunboat Temerario. At Genoa, the Spanish ships took part in more events related to the anniversary.

At the end of 1896, Vitoria arrived at La Seyne-sur-Mer, France, for conversion into a central battery ironclad at the shipyard of Forges et Chantiers de la Méditerranée. Her masts and rigging were replaced by two military masts fitted with fighting tops, her 160 mm (6.3 in) guns were removed (and later were installed on the new protected cruiser Lepanto), and she was modified to accommodate new armament. She returned to Spain before the Spanish-American War broke out in April 1898 and before her new guns could be installed. She received temporary armament and was assigned to the 2nd Squadron under the overall command of Contralmirante (Counter Admiral) Manuel de la Cámara y Livermoore. When Cámara's squadron made its abortive sortie to relieve Spanish forces in the Philippines, Vitoria remained behind in Spain, where she spent the war on defensive duties at Cádiz. She saw no combat during the war, which ended in August 1898.

Vitoria after her 1899 conversion to a coastal defense ship.

After the war, Vitoria′s new armament was installed. It consisted of four 200-millimetre (7.9 in) Hontoria guns, four 160-millimetre (6.3 in) Hontoria guns, twelve 150-millimetre (5.9 in) Škoda quick-firing guns, eight Nordenfelt 57-millimetre (2.2 in) guns, four Škoda 47-millimetre (1.9 in) guns, and four Maxim 37-millimetre (1.5 in) guns. In addition, she carried two 75-millimetre (3.0 in) guns and two Hotchkiss machine guns for disembarkation and use in landings. She was reclassified as a coastal defence ship in 1899.

Vitoria rejoined the Training Squadron in 1899. In June 1901, she made a voyage to the Azores to pay respects to the King of Portugal, Carlos I, who was visiting the islands, then returned to Cadiz in July 1901. In 1903 four of her 150-millimetre (5.9 in) Škoda quick-firing guns were removed, leaving her with eight.

From mid-1903 she was hulked in a reserve status at Ferrol and never put to sea again, although she remained in service as the home of the Spanish Navy's gunnery school until 1907. She was decommissioned in 1908. She was stricken from the navy list in 1912 and scrapped the same year.
