= Spanish cruiser Navarra =

Spanish Navy cruiser of 1882–1899

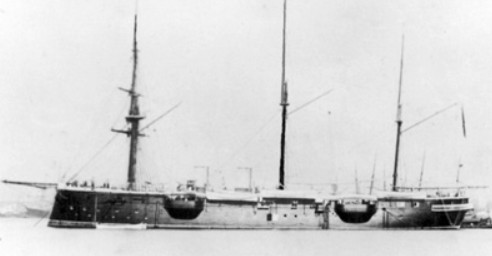

History

Spain
- Name: Navarra
- Namesake: The Kingdom of Navarre
- Ordered: January 1869
- Builder: Reales Astilleros de Esteiro, Ferrol, Spain
- Laid down: May 1869
- Launched: August 1881
- Completed: 1882
- Fate: Either hulked in 1896 and sold for scrap in 1899 or became a cadet training ship in 1900

General characteristics
- Class & type: Aragon-class unprotected cruiser
- Displacement: 3,289 tons
- Length: 236 ft 0 in (71.93 m)
- Beam: 44 ft 0 in (13.41 m)
- Draft: 23 ft 6 in (7.16 m) maximum
- Installed power: 1,400 ihp (1,000 kW)
- Propulsion: 1-shaft, 3-cylinder, horizontal compound
- Sail plan: Barque-rigged
- Speed: 14 knots (26 km/h; 16 mph)
- Range: 2,180 nmi (4,040 km; 2,510 mi)
- Complement: 392 officers and enlisted
- Armament: As completed, included 8 × 8 in (203 mm) 180-pounder rifled muzzle-loading guns; In 1885: 4 × 5.9 in (150 mm) guns; 2 × 4.7 in (119 mm) breech-loading guns; 2 × 87 mm guns; 4 × 75 mm guns; 10 × machine guns; 2 × 14 in (356 mm) torpedo tubes
- Notes: 460 tons of coal (normal)

Navarra was an Aragon-class unprotected cruiser of the Spanish Navy in the late 19th century.

== Technical characteristics ==
Navarra was built by the Reales Astilleros de Esteiro at Ferrol, Spain. Her construction as an armored corvette with a central battery ironclad design began in 1869, with plans to give her 890 tons of armor and 500 millimetres (19.7 in) of armor at the waterline. In 1870, her design was changed to that of an unprotected cruiser or wooden corvette, and, after political events delayed her construction, she finally was launched in this form in 1881 and completed in 1882. Her original conception as an armored ship and the change to an unarmored one during construction left her with an overly heavy wooden hull that was obsolescent by the time of her launch. Designed for colonial service, she had two funnels and was rigged as a barque. Her machinery was manufactured at the naval shipyard at Ferrol. The original main battery of Armstrong-built 8-inch (203 mm) guns was obsolescent when she was completed, and were quickly replaced with more modern Krupp-built guns, with the 5.9-inch (150 mm) guns mounted in sponsons.

== Operational history ==
In the summer of 1884, Navarra was assigned to a two-year stint with the Training Squadron. She rendezvoused with the squadron — which also included the armored frigate Vitoria, the screw frigates Almansa, Carmen, and Lealtad, and the gunboat Paz — in the waters off Ferrol when it arrived there that summer from Vigo, Spain, carrying King Alfonso XII and Queen Maria Christina.

Amidst a diplomatic crisis with the German Empire over the status of the Caroline Islands in the Spanish East Indies, the Spanish government became concerned that Germany might occupy the Balearic Islands in the Mediterranean Sea and use them as a bargaining chip in future peace negotiations. Accordingly, it ordered the Training Squadron to concentrate at Mahón on Menorca in the Balearics and prepare to defend the islands. The squadron arrived at Mahón on 18 March 1886, and Navarra and Almansa soon joined it there. In the end, the war scare passed with no conflict breaking out.

In November 1886, Navarra arrived at Fernando Pó in the Gulf of Guinea off the Guinea coast of West Africa carrying several prisoners condemned for a September 1886 republican military uprising against the Bourbon Restoration organized from exile by Manuel Ruiz Zorrilla and led by General Manuel Villacampa del Castillo. The prisoners had been sentenced to death, but their sentences had been reduced to imprisonment in Africa.

Navarra and her sister ship Castilla got underway from San Sebastián on 4 September 1887 to escort the steamship Ferrolano as Ferrolano transported Queen Maria Christina for a visit to Getaria (Spanish: Guetaria), Spain. The ships returned to San Sebastián that night. In October 1887, Navarra and Castilla visited Tangier in Morocco.

Navarra was part of a squadron of Spanish Navy ships — which also included Castilla, the armored frigate Numancia, the protected cruisers Isla de Cuba and Isla de Luzón, the screw frigates Blanca and Gerona, the destroyer Destructor, the gunboats Cóndor and Pilar, and the transport Legazpi — which was at Barcelona, Spain, on 20 May 1888 for the opening of the 1888 Barcelona Universal Exposition.

In September 1889, fighting broke out in Morocco that culminated in a Moroccan attack on the Spanish gunboat Cocodrilo. On 23 September the Training Squadron — consisting of Castilla, Pelayo, and Numancia — proceeded from Cádiz to Al Hoceima (known to the Spanish as Alhucemas) in Morocco, where it rendezvoused with Gerona and Isla de Luzón. Meanwhile Isla de Cuba headed for Tangier and Navarra got underway from Tangier bound for Al Hoceima carrying emissaries from the Sultan of Morocco to free prisoners from the captured vessel Miguel y Teresa.

In the early 1890s, Navarra deployed to the Captaincy General of Cuba. She later returned to Spain and became a training ship for sailors. Fighting again broke out in Morocco in September 1893 which led to the First Melillan campaign, and with the campaign underway Navarra was assigned to the Training Squadron at the end of November 1893. In 1896, Navarra was hulked as a depot ship at Cartagena, Spain.

== Decommissioning and disposal ==
Sources provide a variety of accounts of Navarra′s decommissioning and ultimate fate. One states that she was decommissioned on 9 January 1899 and auctioned off and sold in mid-1901 to a company in Bilbao, Spain, for use as a coal storage hulk. Another claims that she was sold for scrapping in 1899, while a third asserts that she became a cadet training ship in 1900 without describing her subsequent fate.
