= Aragon-class cruiser =

Class of ship in Spanish Navy

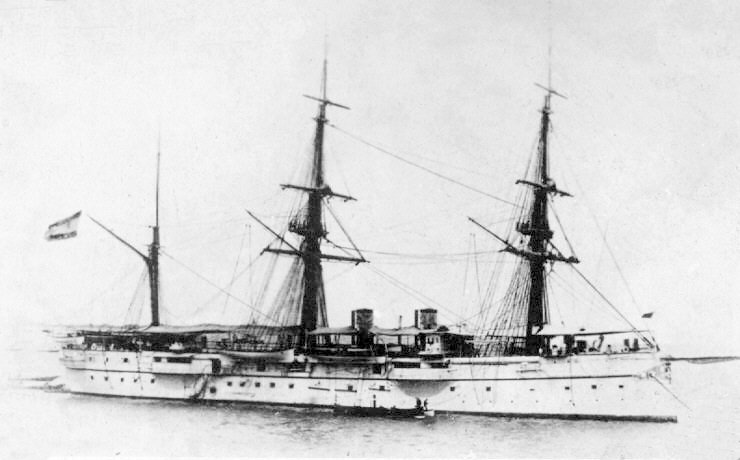
- An unidentified Aragon-class (here called "Castilla-class") cruiser in the 1880s or 1890s

Class overview
- Name: Aragon
- Builders: Naval shipyards at Cádiz, Cartagena, and Ferrol, Spain
- Built: 1869–1882
- In commission: 1880–1895?
- Planned: 3
- Completed: 3
- Lost: 1
- Retired: 2

General characteristics
- Type: Unprotected cruiser
- Displacement: 3,289 tons
- Length: 236 ft (72 m)
- Beam: 44 ft (13 m)
- Draft: 23 ft 6 in (7.16 m) maximum
- Propulsion: 1-shaft, 3-cylinder horizontal compound, 4,400 ihp (3,300 kW)
- Speed: 14 knots (26 km/h)
- Complement: Castilla 392; others 389
- Armament: Aragon: 6 × 6.4 in (163 mm) guns; 2 × 3 in (87 mm) guns; 4 × 3 in (75 mm) guns; 2 × 14 in (356 mm) torpedo tubes; Navarra: 4 × 5.9 in (150 mm) breech-loading guns; 2 × 4.7 in (119 mm) breech-loading guns; 2 × 87 mm guns; 4 × 75 mm guns; 2 × 14 in (356 mm) torpedo tubes; Castilla: 4 × 5.9 in (150 mm) breech-loading guns; 2 × 4.7 in (119 mm) breech-loading guns; 2 × 87 mm guns; 4 × 75 mm guns; 10 × machine guns; 2 × 14 in (356 mm) torpedo tubes
- Notes: 460 tons of coal (normal)

The Aragon class of unprotected cruisers was a series of three cruisers built between the late 1860s and early 1880s for service with the Spanish Navy. They were named for historic regions and kingdoms of Spain.

== Description ==
Construction of the Aragon-class cruisers as armored corvettes with a central battery ironclad design began in 1869, with plans to give them 890 tons of armor and 500 millimetres (19.7 in) of armor at the waterline. In 1870, their design was changed to that of an unprotected cruiser or wooden corvette; political events delayed their construction, but they finally were launched in this form in the years between 1879 and 1881 and completed in 1880 and 1882. Their original conception as armored ships and the change to an unarmored one during construction left them with an overly heavy wooden hull that was obsolescent by the time they were launched.

The ships had two funnels and were rigged as barques. The lead unit's machinery was manufactured by the John Penn Company in the United Kingdom, while her sisters' was manufactured at the naval shipyard at Ferrol following John Penn's pattern. The original main battery of Armstrong-built 8-inch (203 mm) guns was obsolescent when the ships were completed, and were quickly replaced with more modern guns mounted in sponsons, with Aragon more heavily armed than her sisters. Designed for colonial service, they were never intended to fight the kind of heavily armed, armored, steel-hulled warships Castilla would face in the Battle of Manila Bay.

== History ==
Much of the operational history of the Aragon-class cruisers is obscure. Castilla served in home waters and then in the Philippines, where she was sunk, but it is known only that the other two were in home waters in the 1890s. Sources differ on whether Aragon and Navarra were hulked and then scrapped in the 1890s or survived into the early 20th century in non-combat roles.

== Ships in class ==
=== Aragón ===
Aragón, the lead unit, was under construction for eleven years before commissioning in 1880. In home waters in the 1890s, she either was hulked in 1896 and sold for scrap in 1900 or survived until stricken around 1905.

=== Navarra ===
Navarra was under construction for thirteen years before commissioning in 1882. In home waters in the 1890s, she either was hulked in 1896 and sold for scrap in 1899 or survived to become a cadet training ship in 1900.

=== Castilla ===
Castilla was under construction for thirteen years before commissioning in 1882. After early service in Spanish waters, she was sent to the Philippines, where she supported Spanish operations against Philippine insurgents in 1896–1897, the early part of the Philippine Revolution known to the colonial Spaniards as the "Tagalog Revolt." She was part of the squadron of Rear Admiral Patricio Montojo y Pasaron when the Spanish–American War began, and was sunk in the Battle of Manila Bay on 1 May 1898.
