= The Hundred Days (novel) =

1998 novel by Patrick O'Brian

- First edition cover
- Author: Patrick O'Brian
- Cover artist: Geoff Hunt
- Language: English
- Series: Aubrey-Maturin series
- Genre: Historical novel
- Publisher: HarperCollins
- Publication date: 28 September 1998
- Publication place: United Kingdom
- Media type: Print (Hardback & Paperback) & Audio Book (Compact audio cassette, Compact Disc)
- Pages: 352 first edition, hardback
- ISBN: 0-00-225789-0 first edition, hardback
- OCLC: 40491462
- Preceded by: The Yellow Admiral
- Followed by: Blue at the Mizzen

The Hundred Days is the nineteenth historical novel in the Aubrey-Maturin series by British author Patrick O'Brian, first published in 1998. The story is set during the Napoleonic Wars, specifically in their last portion in 1815, the Hundred Days.

Napoleon escaped his exile at Elba and gained a huge army as he marched up from the south coast of France to Paris, unseating Louis XVIII. The allies of 1813 and 1814 are coming together again to join their armies on land to stop Napoleon keeping the France he has retaken. Forces on the north coast of Africa are raising money to block the allied armies from joining, favouring Napoleon. Aubrey and his convoy are given the mission to destroy shipyards supporting Napoleon along the Adriatic Coast and to stop that money, if it indeed has been raised, from reaching its destination. Maturin and Dr Amos Jacob negotiate in Algiers, where, among other accomplishments, Maturin shoots a lioness leaping at him and the Dey of Algiers.

Reviewers enjoyed this novel, especially that it has all they expect of a novel in this series, plus more of a plot, and one goes so far as to say "This is strictly an adventure tale." Many authors write fictional tales set in the dramatic Hundred Days after Napoleon escaped his exile and induced a conclusive end to the long wars, but "O'Brian has added a clever fictional twist" with the plot bringing the reader to North Africa on a hunt for a galley full of small gold ingots to release a large army of mercenaries to increase the odds of Napoleon's large and rapidly re-built army winning. There is another aspect to the novel, as it starts with deaths, leaving Maturin a widower, so that "its recurring leitmotif is one of the subtlest sketchings of deep, deep grief in literature." What makes this novel special is the "rendering of the internal lives of the characters – his loving and apt portrayal of their rich mix of feelings and experiences". Others note that over the long years of writing this series, the powers of the author have not diminished, yet the characters are "realistically aging" and "their victory is not without cost." The novel's "prose moves between the maritime sublime and the Austenish bon mot, "a man generally disliked is hardly apt to lavish good food and wine on those who despise him, and Ward's dinners were execrable"." Again, the author's staying power as a writer is commended: "O'Brian continues to unroll a splendid Turkish rug of a saga" A key to the success of the novel is O'Brian's "invention of dual heroes, the bluff and ultracompetent Aubrey being always accompanied by his eccentric ship's surgeon, Stephen Maturin", and although the Napoleonic Wars have come to a close, this time for good, the ending of the novel suggests it is not the last adventure for Aubrey and Maturin.

== Plot summary ==
Maturin rejoins the squadron at Funchal after burying his wife, killed when her carriage overturned. Fitted out, Commodore Aubrey's squadron meets at Gibraltar with Admiral Lord Keith, who updates him on Napoleon's success at Paris and the armies gathered on land. He orders Aubrey first to defend a convoy of merchant ships from Moorish xebecs and galleys, and then to proceed to the Adriatic Sea to destroy any new ships being built to support Napoleon. The grieving Maturin, in a separate meeting, learns of a plot to send sufficient gold through Algiers to fund Muslim mercenaries who would block the Russian forces from joining those of the other allies, so Napoleon's army can attack one army at a time. Aubrey's squadron is successful in defending the convoy. The captain of the Pomone is haunted by the faces of the galley slaves who died when his ship attacked theirs; Aubrey reports he died cleaning his guns, and a new captain is assigned to Pomone. The convoy proceeds toward the Adriatic, stopping in Mahón. At sea, they encounter Captain Christy-Palliere, of the Royalist Caroline and an old acquaintance, who informs Aubrey about the French situation in the Adriatic before parting. Amos Jacob is sent out on Ringle to Kutali and Spalato to gain more information. Surprise sinks a French frigate under the command of an Imperialist at Ragusa Vecchia. Jacob rejoins near Porte di Spalato where they meet another French frigate, whose captain, like so many, does not want to declare for Napoleon but fears he will win. Maturin and Jacob negotiate an agreement for the French frigate to fight a mock battle against both Surprise and Pomone; the Frenchman then accompanies Pomone to Malta. Following up the pressure put on banks not to loan to the small shipyards, they lay out gold to push disgruntled dockworkers to burn new French ships along the coast, which is effective.

Reaching Algiers, Maturin and Jacob meet the Consul, Sir Peter Clifford, and his wife. They meet with the Dey's Vizier at Kasbah, the Dey's palace. They travel to meet the Dey, Omar Pasha, at his hunting-lodge at Shatt el Khadna in the Atlas Mountains. The Dey invites Maturin to hunt lions with him. The Dey kills a large lion while Maturin kills its lioness as it leaps to them, saving the Dey's life. For this deed, Omar Pasha swears that no gold will sail from Algiers, and gives Maturin one of his rifles as a parting gift. Jacob befriends Ahmed Ben Habdal, who reveals that Pasha sent a contrary message to the Sheikh of Azgar, to have the gold carried by a fast-sailing xebec from Arzila, near Tangiers, captained by an Algerian corsair via the Strait of Gibraltar straight to Durazzo. Maturin and Jacob return to Algiers, and wait for Ringle to appear. Maturin buys two Irish children in the slave market. Once he sees the Ringle windbound off shore, they engage a local vessel to put them aboard Ringle. Before leaving, they learn Pasha is killed, and replaced by Ali Bey.

Reade relates the damage sustained by Surprise during the fierce storm. They join Aubrey in Port Mahon, and speak with Admiral Fanshawe. Aubrey agrees to pursue the xebec. They encounter Hamadryad under old friend Heneage Dundas, who tells them that Lord Barmouth is in place of Lord Keith. In Gibraltar, Maturin tells Aubrey not to worry about Barmouth, because Peter Arden, Barmouth's political man, respects Lord Keith. Barmouth tells Aubrey to take his broad pennant down, as his squadron is dispersed. Later, Barmouth is joined by his new wife, who he learns is a cousin to Aubrey. On his return, Aubrey finds Barmouth friendly to him, as Barmouth wanted his wife with him. Before leaving for this battle, Maturin leaves the twin children with Lady Keith.

Dr Jacob learns the corsair has two galleys to act as decoys whilst he lies under Tarifa before running through the Strait. The Surprise, Ringle and the blue cutter lie in wait in the Strait. The galley sees three armed ships, and Murad Reis, her captain, fires on the frigate, destroying one gun, and killing Bonden, the coxswain, as well as Hallam, a midshipman. After a long pursuit, the galley hides at Cranc (Crab) island, where Surprise and Ringle, unable to follow the galley into the shallow lagoon, block the exit. A gun from the Surprise is hoisted up a cliff, where it can fire unopposed on the galley. The galley's crew, seeing the situation is hopeless, behead Murad and surrender. Returning victorious to Gibraltar, the Surprise sees the town exploding fireworks, and learns that Napoleon has lost in the Low Countries, fully beaten. Ali Bey sends word he wants the gold; he is killed and the new Dey, Hassan, admits the xebec fired first, and asks for a loan to consolidate his position in Algiers. The xebec is cleaned up and sent to Algiers, while the gold is shared out in Gibraltar. Barmouth worries that his new wife is too friendly with Aubrey, so he sends him off to the venture in Chile.

== Characters ==
- Jack Aubrey: Commodore with his pennant on HMS Pomone, shifted at Gibraltar to HMHV Surprise; Captain of His Majesty's Hired Vessel Surprise when the convoy disperses.
- Stephen Maturin: Ship's surgeon, physician, friend to Jack and an intelligence officer, recently widowed.
- Sophia Aubrey: Wife of Jack Aubrey and mother of their three children, Charlotte, Fanny and George.
- Diana Villiers: Wife of Stephen Maturin and mother of their daughter Brigid. Diana dies in a carriage accident in England after the families return from Madeira.
- Brigid Maturin: Young daughter of Stephen and Diana.
- Mrs Clarissa Oakes: Governess to Brigid Maturin. Introduced in Clarissa Oakes / The Truelove.
- Mrs Williams: Mother of Sophia and aunt to Diana. She also is killed in the carriage accident.
- Padeen Colman: Irish-speaking servant to Stephen Maturin, now part of his household on land.
- Lieutenant Edwards and John Arrowsmith: Two retired Lieutenants living in Gibraltar who narrate the arrival of Surprise and discuss recent deaths announced in the Naval Gazette.

Intelligence for Royal Navy actions

- Admiral Lord Keith: Commander-in-Chief Mediterranean Fleet who called Aubrey back into service at Madeira and gives orders once Aubrey reaches Gibraltar. Introduced in Master and Commander.
- Queeney, Lady Keith: Wife of Admiral Lord Keith and longtime friend of Aubrey. Introduced in Master and Commander.
- Campbell: Secretary to Admiral Lord Keith, present at the meeting with Maturin.
- Sir Joseph Blaine: Chief naval intelligence officer, who sends his information by coded letter to Maturin.
- Mr William Kent: Whitehall official in Gibraltar to meet with Maturin.
- Mr Dee: Authority on Eastern matters, particularly finance of Muslim states, who is in Gibraltar to meet with Maturin.
- Dr Amos Jacob: Assistant surgeon on the Surprise. He assists Maturin in languages of the eastern Mediterranean. He was born an Orthodox Spanish Jew, who speaks English, French, Ladino, Hebrew, Arabic and Turkish and he is a Cainite. He has interest in gems and trained in medicine with Maturin.
- Colvin: From naval intelligence, he meets Maturin at Mahon to tell him of the agreement with bankers not to make loans to small shipyards along the Adriatic Sea, and that if Maturin is willing to work with the Carbonari, they will finish the task of stopping shipbuilding when the shipyards do not pay their workers for several weeks, by setting fire to the yards.
- Ibn Hazm: Shi'ite Muslim Sheikh of Azgar, at a crossroads in the desert, who is thought by Dee to have enough gold to pay the soldiers who would block the Russian army from meeting with the allies, thus favouring Napoleon.

Crews and officers aboard ships

- Barrett Bonden: Aubrey's coxswain. He is killed in the action with the xebec.
- Preserved Killick: Aubrey's steward who assists Maturin as well.
- Dr Glover: Surgeon on HMS Pomone.
- Mr Harding: First Lieutenant on the Surprise, introduced in The Commodore.
- Mr Somers: Second Lieutenant on the Surprise, asked by Maturin to act as his second after Hobden insulted Maturin. Introduced in The Commodore.
- Mr Whewell: Third Lieutenant on the Surprise, introduced in The Commodore.
- John Daniel: Master's Mate on the Surprise with a particular love of and skill with numbers, a good navigator.
- Hobden: Marine Captain on the Surprise.
- Mr Woodbine: Master on the Surprise.
- Mrs Poll Skeeping: Loblolly boy on the Surprise.
- McLeod: Joined at Gibraltar, had been on HMS Centaur when Commodore Hood set his pennant on her at Diamond Rock, and in his youth was a Saint Kilda cragsman; he agrees to aid in bringing a gun up Cranc Island.
- Charles de La Tour: Captain of frigate Ardent, an Imperialist (supporter of Napoleon), met at Ragusa Vecchia on the eastern shore of the Adriatic Sea.

New allies

- Guillaume Christy-Pallière: Captain of the Royalist Caroline and long-time friend to Aubrey and Maturin after he captured them; introduced in Master and Commander.
- Richard: Secretary on the Caroline.
- Captain Delalande: Captain of the Cerbère, Royalist, who shoots blanks at Spalato, for a dignified display of force to support his stand with the Royalists.

Met at Mahon

- Admiral Fanshawe: Port Admiral of Mahon.
- James Wright: Engineer and Member of the Royal Society with knowledge of structures. Maturin seeks him out to consider the structure of the horn of the narwhal.

Met at Algiers

- Omar Pasha: Dey of Algiers with whom Maturin negotiates and hunts lions. He is a tall man, soldierly. Killed before Maturin leaves Algiers.
- Ali Bey: Next Dey of Algiers, selected as Maturin leaves Algiers. He favours the British over Napoleon. He insists that the cargo of the xebec under Murad Reis be returned to him. On news of Napoleon's defeat, he is killed.
- Hassan: Succeeds Bey as the Dey of Algiers. He agrees that the British were attacked by Reis, drops all claims, and asks for a loan.
- Vizier Hashin: Political agent for the Dey of Algiers who hoped another man would replace Pasha as Dey.
- Ahmed Ben Habdal: Assistant to the Vizier, who is a Cainite like Dr Jacob. He shares information with Dr Jacob.
- Sir Peter Clifford: British consul at Algiers.
- Lady Isabel Clifford: Wife of Sir Peter, who is gracious but she looks down on the Irish children.
- Kevin and Mona Fitzpatrick: Seven-year-old twins seized off the Munster coast by Corsairs, who are on sale in the slave market at Algiers. Maturin purchases them to return them to their family in Ireland.

Met in the Mediterranean Sea or at Gibraltar

- Heneage Dundas: Captain of HMS Hamadryad, a new appointment for him. He is a long time friend of Aubrey.
- Admiral Lord Barmouth: In charge of the Mediterranean fleet after Lord Keith retires.
- Isobel Carrington: The new Lady Barmouth and Jack Aubrey's cousin.
- Matthew Arden: Political officer for Admiral Barmouth, and long time colleague of Maturin.
- Murad Reis: Captain of a corsair xebec carrying gold. He aims to sail from Tangiers through the Strait of Gibraltar across the Mediterranean to an Adriatic port to deliver it, to pay soldiers. In the battle with Surprise, his crew kills him.

Squadron leaders

- Captain Hugh Pomfret: HMS Pomone who is haunted by the faces of the men killed in a ship action. Aubrey reports that he died by accident while cleaning his guns and he is buried on land.
- Captain John Vaux: Appointed to replace Pomfret on Pomone.
- Captain Ward: HMS Dover.
- Captain Brawley: HMS Rainbow.
- Captain Cartwright: HMS Gannymede.
- Captain Harris: HMS Briseis.
- William Reade: Master's mate sailing Aubrey's tender, Ringle; introduced in The Thirteen Gun Salute. In The Nutmeg of Consolation, he lost one arm in battle.

== Ships ==
British

- HMS Royal Sovereign – Lord Keith's Flagship of Mediterranean Fleet
- HMS Implacable – Lord Barmouth's Flagship of Mediterranean Fleet
- HMS Hamadryad – frigate
- HMS Lion – third rate ship of the line assisted by Surprise during the fierce storm at sea

Jack Aubrey's squadron

- HMS Pomone – thirty-eight guns
- HMHV Surprise – 28 gun frigate
- HMS Dover – thirty-two guns
- HMS Rainbow – Post-ship
- HMS Ganymede – Post-ship
- HMS Briseis – brig
- Ringle – ship's tender for HMHV Surprise, Baltimore clipper design

French

- His Most Christian Majesty's frigate Caroline
- Ardent – thirty-two gun Bonapartist frigate; Captain Charles de La Tour
- Cerbère – frigate; Captain Delalande

Algerine

- xebec – four 24 pound guns

== Title ==
The title refers to the Hundred Days, a period when Napoleon Bonaparte escaped from Elba and temporarily returned to power in France.

== Reviews ==
Kirkus Reviews finds brilliantly rendered clashes at sea, yet the strong point of the novel is the "utterly convincing evocation of early 19th-century Europe". This volume "in the most successful modern series of historical fiction indicates no diminishment of power or inventiveness on the part of its author." The characters are "realistically aging" and "their victory is not without cost."

Publishers Weekly notes that "the prose moves between the maritime sublime and the Austenish bon mot, "a man generally disliked is hardly apt to lavish good food and wine on those who despise him, and Ward's dinners were execrable"." They enjoy O'Brian's staying power as a writer; "O'Brian continues to unroll a splendid Turkish rug of a saga, and if it seems unlikely that the sedentary Stephen would hunt lions in the Atlas mountains (with the Dey of Algiers!), O'Brian brings off even this narrative feat with aplomb."

Paul Kennedy writing in The New York Times says O'Brian's tales differ from others: "But these naval tales are blended into a larger panorama of Georgian society and politics, science, medicine, botany and the whole conspectus of contemporary Enlightenment knowledge about the natural world." A key to the success of the novel is "his invention of dual heroes, the bluff and ultracompetent Aubrey being always accompanied by his eccentric ship's surgeon, Stephen Maturin". As this story brings the series to the final end of the Napoleonic wars, Kennedy asks, will this be the last novel? He thinks the closing, when the Admiral bids Aubrey to go to Chile, suggests there is more to come, as the real life of Thomas Cochrane, a sometime model for Aubrey, finds Cochrane in Chile in 1814.

Patrick Reardon writing in the Chicago Tribune says this novel is a bit different from the earlier ones in the series: "a bit unusual for books in the series inasmuch as it has more of a plot". Like the rest of the series, what gives the novel distinction is the "rendering of the internal lives of the characters--his loving and apt portrayal of their rich mix of feelings and experiences".

Anthony Day writing in the Los Angeles Times notes that "This is strictly an adventure tale." To the history of Napoleon's victorious return to France, building a huge army in weeks, and a strategy to defeat the allies once joined against him, "O'Brian has added a clever fictional twist. Muslim mercenaries have gathered in the Balkans willing to join Napoleon's forces--for a price. A sheik from a trading post in the Algerian desert holds that price, a nice store of gold." Of all the intriguing features of this novel, the best part is the "elegant and witty English prose consistent with late 18th-century diction, vocabulary and rhythm."

Writing for The Independent, Christina Hardyment feels that a reader will understand less the impact of some aspects of the plot, not having read the earlier books in the series, on account of the importance of the characters: each new book is "letter about a much-loved and ever-growing family of characters in an unerringly authentic and gloriously patriotic setting." She says of this book "that its recurring leitmotif is one of the subtlest sketchings of deep, deep grief in literature."

== Series continuity ==
This novel begins about six weeks after the end of The Yellow Admiral, after Napoleon arrived in Paris with a large army, the king leaves Paris, and the Allied armies rapidly gather on the continent to engage Napoleon's army. Dramatic events in England brought Maturin home; he rejoins the squadron at Funchal.

The story concludes with Napoleon's defeat at Waterloo, the final end of the Napoleonic wars until the treaties were signed in July 1815. Aubrey and Maturin set sail for Chile in the Surprise to undermine Spanish colonial rule there, promoting the independence movement, to gain an ally for Britain. This is a continuation of the theme started in The Wine-Dark Sea. Aubrey meets Captain Christy-Pallière as an ally, after first meeting him as the lieutenant who took him and his ship prisoner in the first novel, Master and Commander. Diana's diamond of great value, called the Blue Peter, was first mentioned in The Fortune of War, used to recover Maturin from a French prison in The Surgeon's Mate, pawned in The Yellow Admiral to support their family until Stephen's fortune is again available to him to buy it back, and in this novel, the diamond is buried with her.

Sailing to the Adriatic Sea, Aubrey sends Jacob to Kutali to speak with his allies there, to gain the latest information on the rumour from Christy-Palliere, about gold being sent to pay for soldiers who in turn would block the Russian army from joining the armies of the other allies. Aubrey and Maturin made friends in Kutali in The Ionian Mission. Links like this emphasise how Aubrey gained both allies and skills over the course of his naval career that serve him well when the war re-starts.

== Deaths of characters in the series of novels ==
News of several deaths is received by Maturin and Aubrey in this story. Stephen's wife Diana dies, as does Aubrey's mother-in-law, Mrs Williams and her equally unpleasant companion, in a crash when Diana's daring driving overturns their coach. Diana's death leaves Stephen completely shattered, unwilling to eat or speak for long periods of time, but he pulls himself together to foil Napoleon's latest plot. Christine Hatherleigh Wood's husband, Captain Wood, the colonial governor of Sierra Leone also dies; Dr Glover tells Stephen their marriage was almost a sham given that the husband was impotent. Admiral Lord Stranraer's death is reported, as he took too much of the medication on his own choice, after the doctors properly tapered his dosage down. He was introduced in The Yellow Admiral as an influential admiral who spread ill will about Aubrey. Gossip has it the reverse (that the doctors increased the dosage, rather than the patient), likely because he was not a well-liked man.

As part of the last military action in this story, the coxswain for Aubrey, and frequent helper to Maturin, Barret Bonden, is killed instantaneously by the one cannon shot from the xebec. Other crew members are killed too, but none who began with Aubrey in Master and Commander, and sailed with him at every chance.

== Historical and scientific references ==
There is a theme of the seaman's notion of luck and the curiosity of the scientists. Dr Amos Jacob brings aboard a preserved hand exhibiting what is described as palmar aponeurosis - and now known as Dupuytren's contracture, named for distinguished surgeon and Maturin's friend Baron Guillaume Dupuytren, a hand with the fingers bent inwards and the fingernails growing through the flesh of the palm. It is stored in the alcoholic spirits of wine to preserve it. Stephen Maturin also brings aboard a narwhal tusk given him by Aubrey from a previous Baltic voyage.

The superstitious seamen accept one as a Hand of Glory and the other as a unicorn's horn, and regard them as good luck charms. Seamen drink the spirits, leaving the hand much deteriorated, and put out to dry, to see what could be saved. The Marine Captain's dog, Naseby, eats the hand, and an emetic only recovers the bones. The narwhal tusk is broken when a drunken Killick and an even more drunken ship's boy drop and break it - something that makes the domineering Killick suddenly very unpopular with his shipmates. A measure of goodwill and luck are restored on the ship when Maturin wires the bones together to make a skeletal hand - even more sinister looking, which pleases the crew. Good luck is restored when a marine engineer, Mr Wright, glues the horn back together after he analyses its structure.

The idea and the methods to haul a gun up Cranc island came from a seaman who had been at Diamond Rock near Martinique in 1803, when several guns were brought up to make a secure position.

== Allusion to real places ==
Aubrey sails his convoy to Gibraltar, then to Mahón. In seeking out ports with ships to burn or sink, they reach Ragusa Vecchia and next Porte di Spalato on the coast of the Adriatic Sea. In Algiers, Maturin visits the Kasbah, the palace of the Dey. The two-faced Dey promises no gold will sail from Algiers when Maturin saves his life from the attacking lioness, but at the same time directs that the gold sail from Arzila, just southwest of Tangiers, through the Strait of Gibraltar to Durazzo, an Adriatic port. The ship is hidden near Tarifa, the southernmost point of Spain, to the west and south of Gibraltar along the Strait of Gibraltar.

== Publication history ==
- 1998, UK, HarperCollins (ISBN 0-00-225789-0), 7 September 1998, hardcover (First edition)
- 1998, UK, HarperCollins (ISBN 0001055313), 7 September 1998, audiobook (Audio Cassette, narrator Robert Hardy abridged)
- 1998, USA, W. W. Norton & Company (ISBN 0-393-04674-5), pub date October 1998, hardcover
- 1998, Recorded Books, LLC; Unabridged Audio edition narrated by Patrick Tull (ISBN 1402591802)
- 1999, UK, HarperCollins, (ISBN 0006512119), 20 September 1999, paperback
- 1999, USA, W W Norton (ISBN 0-393-31979-2), October 1999, hardcover
- 2000, USA, Thorndike Press (ISBN 0786217480), March 1999, hardcover (Large Print)
- 2000, USA, Thorndike Press (ISBN 0786217499), January 2000, paperback (Large Print)
- 2001, USA, Soundings (ISBN 978-1-86042-939-2), January 2001, audiobook (Audio CD, narrator Graham Roberts)
- 2007, USA, Blackstone Audiobooks (ISBN 1433201240), April 2007, audiobook (MP3 CD, narrator Simon Vance)
- 2011, USA, W. W. Norton & Company (ISBN 978-0-393-08851-9), 5 December 2011, e-book (USA edition)
