= The Yellow Admiral =

1996 novel by Patrick O'Brian

- First edition cover
- Author: Patrick O'Brian
- Cover artist: Geoff Hunt
- Language: English
- Series: Aubrey-Maturin series
- Genre: Historical novel
- Publisher: HarperCollins (UK)
- Publication date: 1996
- Publication place: United Kingdom
- Media type: Print (Hardback & Paperback) & Audio Book (Compact audio cassette, Compact Disc)
- Pages: 282 first edition, hardback
- ISBN: 0-393-04044-5 first edition, hardback
- OCLC: 34943241
- Dewey Decimal: 823/.914 20
- LC Class: PR6029.B55 Y45 1996
- Preceded by: The Commodore
- Followed by: The Hundred Days

The Yellow Admiral is the eighteenth naval historical novel in the Aubrey-Maturin series by English author Patrick O'Brian, first published in 1996. The story is set in the era of the Napoleonic Wars.

The ships of his squadron are dispersed by the Admiralty as Aubrey's two missions (to the slave coast of Africa and up to Ireland's west coast) were completed and Aubrey is no longer a commodore. Captain Aubrey is left in command of HMS Bellona. He sails her on blockade duty around Brest, France, under an admiral who dislikes him for actions on land and makes trouble for Aubrey in the Royal Navy. On land, he is settled in Woolcombe, the family estate, where he has powers as lord of the manor. Aubrey's financial troubles are eased by his capture of a prize. Dr Maturin retrieves his family but not his fortune, and they settle in an empty wing of the Aubrey's family estate. As the war against Napoleon looks to be ending, Maturin works out a plan to keep Aubrey at sea on his privately owned ship Surprise to chart Chile's coast, while Maturin aids the Chilean independence movement. Aubrey suspends himself from the Navy List to avoid the worst career fate, being yellowed, set aside with no squadron of his own, until his reputation can be salvaged, to which end, Napoleon lends a hand by restarting the war.

Critical reception varied, from "taking his readers for granted", "an interim novel" or "somewhat predictable, nonetheless full of life" to "another excellent adventure" and "the top of his elegant form". As often happens, reviewers comment on the whole series to date ("virtuosity", "the best things of their kind", "uniquely excellent", "as always lapidary prose"), and are glad this is not the last book in the series, there is more to come, recommending readers new to the series to start it from the first novel. Aubrey's relationship with his wife is noted as a strong point of this novel, as is the sly humour and some of the "set pieces", like the boxing match and actions at sea during the blockade.

== Plot summary ==
Aubrey, captain of HMS Bellona in the Brest blockade after his squadron was dispersed, is home at Woolcombe, the Aubrey family estate, on parliamentary leave. Three lawsuits from owners of slave ships captured on his mission along the West African coast tie up his funds. His wife Sophia rents out Ashgrove Cottage, their marital home. Maturin returns from Spain with his wife Diana and their household, moving into an empty wing of Woolcombe. Maturin's vast wealth is tied up in Spain, where authorities, informed by Jean Dutourd, are displeased at his activities in Peru, a Spanish colony. On land, Aubrey opposes the enclosing of the common, Simmons Lea, which has been proposed in the House by his neighbour, Captain Griffiths. Aubrey has power as lord of the manor, which he uses when the bill is called. Admiral Stranraer on the Brest blockade encouraged this enclosure, and he is uncle to Griffiths. The Admiral calls Aubrey back aboard, hoping to prevent his appearance in Parliament. Quick action on the part of Diana and Clarissa Oakes foils this scheme. Aubrey is watching a boxing match between Barret Bonden and Evans, Griffith's gamekeeper, when the orders arrive at Woolcombe. Mrs Oakes appears at the match to tell Aubrey to proceed directly to Parliament. Stranraer is displeased when Aubrey reveals the committee's decision; he sends HMS Bellona to the inshore blockading-squadron. Aboard the flagship, Maturin receives letters for his covert mission in France. The Admiral tries unsuccessfully to use Maturin to change Aubrey's mind.

At the dark of the moon in heavy fog, Aubrey puts Maturin ashore in France with the Catalan agent, Inigo Bernard. Apparently at the same time, two French ships slip through the blockading squadron in the sector that HMS Bellona patrols. The Admiral rebukes Aubrey, who accepts no blame, and returns Bellona to the offshore squadron. Aubrey receives a letter from Sophie, in which she accuses him of adultery and announces her intention of leaving him, having read letters sent him from Canada by Miss Amanda Smith. Aubrey is spoiling for a fight. During manoeuvres in foggy weather the Bellona spots a French privateer chasing a merchantman. She signals to the fleet, and proceeds to take Les Deux Frères, which proves a rich prize, having captured two Guinea coast merchant ships. A storm batters the Bellona, so Aubrey takes the ship for repair in Cawsand Bay. At Woolcombe, Aubrey asks Sophie for forgiveness, but she rebuffs him. Aubrey sends his tender Ringle to report Bellona's condition to the Admiral. The Admiral then sends Ringle to retrieve Maturin from France. Once Bellona is repaired, Aubrey rejoins the blockading squadron, learning that Ringle has taken Maturin to England. In London, Maturin tells Sir Joseph Blaine about a plot by a Spanish intelligence officer to burgle Blaine's house. With the assistance of Mr Pratt, they capture the Spanish agent red-handed. Maturin updates Sir Joseph on the readiness of Chile for independence. They devise a scheme for an expedition led by Aubrey on the Surprise. The negative reports from Lord Stranrear with the war winding down put Aubrey in the position of being promoted to rear admiral without a squadron, known informally as being admiral of the yellow; as there is no yellow squadron, it is the worst career fate. Maturin learns his fortune is again available to him. In a gesture to his shipmates, Maturin buys new clothes.

Maturin goes to Woolcombe, where Diana tells him of the issue between Sophie and Jack. She and Clarissa have enlightened Sophie as to the possibility of enjoying sex, even suggesting that she have her own affair. Sophie writes a letter of reconciliation to her husband, which Maturin carries aboard. The letter leaves Aubrey joyous. Admiral Stranraer requests Maturin's medical advice; Maturin suggests use of medicines unfamiliar to the flagship's surgeon, to good effect. Bellona finds the inner squadron fighting two French ships of the line. Upon seeing the Bellona and Grampus, the French ships retreat. For months, the Bellona sweeps the bay, blockading Brest. Maturin tells Aubrey of his plan for Chile, to which Aubrey agrees. Queen Charlotte comes to visit the inner squadron, with a stores ship to replenish food. The Admiral thanks Maturin for his treatment. The Admiral informs his captains of the progress in the war on land, where Napoleon is making errors and peace talks are underway but not yet successful.

The peace is announced; Napoleon is exiled to Elba. The crew of the Bellona are paid off and the ship goes into ordinary storage. Aubrey and Maturin read newspapers to learn world events while they were blockading Brest, and adjust to peace. They agree to a plan with three men from the Chilean independence movement. Aubrey requests suspension from the Navy List, and is put on loan to the hydrographic office. Maturin finances the fitting-out of the Surprise, which takes until February 1815. They sail to Madeira with their families aboard. After a brief time on the island, their families will take the packet home. Unexpectecly, Lord Keith, commander-in-chief in the Mediterranean, sends orders to Aubrey reinstating him because Napoleon has escaped from Elba. Aubrey takes command of the Royal Navy ships in the harbour of Madeira to blockade the Straits of Gibraltar.

== Characters ==
See also Recurring characters in the Aubrey–Maturin series

- Jack Aubrey: Post Captain of HMS Bellona, high on the Royal Navy list and Member of Parliament.
- Stephen Maturin: Ship's surgeon, physician, natural philosopher, friend to Jack and an intelligence-officer.
- Sophia Aubrey: Wife of Jack and mother of their three children.
- Charlotte and Fanny Aubrey: Twin daughters of Jack and Sophia, now at their Aunt Frances's school in Ulster.
- Frances (Fanny) Williams Floode: Widowed sister of Sophia, now running a school for girls in Ulster, introduced in Post Captain.
- George Aubrey: Son of Jack and Sophia who attends a local school, and later gets lessons in language from Clarissa Oakes.
- Philip Aubrey: Much younger half-brother to Jack and a midshipman in the Royal Navy.
- Diana Villiers: Wife of Stephen and mother of their daughter; their household rents a wing of Woolcombe after their trip through Spain.
- Brigid Maturin: Young daughter of Stephen and Diana, who develops well, and is friend to George Aubrey.
- Mrs Clarissa Oakes: Widowed young gentlewoman who is Diana's companion and governess to Brigid and later George Aubrey; introduced in Clarissa Oakes.
- Mnason: Aubrey's butler at Woolcombe.
- Mr Cholmondeley: Wealthy friend of Diana who loans his coach to her.
- Heneage Dundas: Captain of the Berenice and long time friend of Aubrey.
- Mrs Williams: Mother of Sophia and aunt to Diana Villiers, a mean and gossiping woman, who lives briefly at Woolcombe and searches through her son-in-law's letters.
- Mrs Selina Morris: Friend and companion to Mrs Williams, of the same character. She marries Briggs and takes the money belonging to all three. Diana Villiers settles the two women in a house in Bath after their crisis.
- Mr Briggs: Servant to Mrs Morris and money man for her and Mrs Williams. He is found to be married to several women, after his marriage to Mrs Morris, and is taken up for that.
- Sarah and Emily Sweeting: Melanesian girls rescued earlier by Maturin (in The Nutmeg of Consolation), set up in The Grapes under Mrs Broad's care.
- Sir Joseph Blaine: Head of Intelligence at the Admiralty, personal friend to Maturin and supporter of Aubrey.
- Jean Dutourd: He is the talkative utopian who will attack any in the way of his ideals. Now in Spain, he maligns Maturin, tying up his funds. Introduced in Clarissa Oakes.
- Preserved Killick: Steward to Aubrey who also tends to Maturin.
- Barret Bonden: Captain's coxswain for Aubrey.
- Padeen Colman: Irish servant to Stephen Maturin, now part of their household on land.
- Captain Griffiths: Nephew to Lord Stranraer who owns property adjoining Woolcombe, the Aubrey family estate, and desires to enclose the commons between the two properties. As peace nears, he sells his property.
- Evans: Griffith's gamekeeper who engages in a boxing match with Bonden.
- Mr Jenkins: Jobbing captain who substitutes aboard Bellona for Aubrey when he is on parliamentary leave.
- William Reade: Master's mate on HMS Bellona, often sailing Aubrey's tender, Ringle; introduced in The Thirteen Gun Salute.
- Mr Callow: Midshipman on the Bellona, who alternates with Reade in sailing the Ringle.
- Mr James (Paddy) Callaghan: Midshipman on the Bellona, found ashore with a young lady when Aubrey and Maturin needed the Ringle to meet their ship. Earlier, he delivers the orders to come aboard to Woolcombe.
- William Smith: First assistant surgeon on Bellona, introduced in The Commodore.
- Alexander Macaulay: Second assistant surgeon on Bellona, introduced in The Commodore.
- Lord Stranraer: Admiral of the Brest blockading squadron, aboard HMS Queen Charlotte, who has enmity against Aubrey, while relying completely on Maturin for treatment of a heart ailment. The treatment is efficacious until he ignores advice on the dose.
- Mr Craddock: Secretary to Admiral Stranraer.
- Captain Calvert: Captain of the Fleet at Brest.
- Miss Amanda Smith: Attractive and deceptive woman who pursued Aubrey in Halifax, sent letters begging money from him and falsely claimed she was pregnant, during The Surgeon's Mate. Soon after the letters, she married a soldier in Halifax.
- William Fanshawe: Post Captain of HMS Ramillies; commander of the inner squadron at Brest.
- Mr Geoghegan: Midshipman and fine oboist; dies from a fall from the yards. His father had been a great help in West Cork in The Commodore.
- Mr Harding: First Lieutenant on the Bellona and volunteer on the Surprise, sailing to Chile.
- Mr Miller: Second Lieutenant on the Bellona and volunteer on the Surprise, sailing to Chile.
- Mr Whewell: Third Lieutenant on the Bellona and volunteer on the Surprise, sailing to Chile, introduced in The Commodore.
- Mr Walkinshaw: Schoolmaster to the midshipmen the Bellona.
- Yann: Former French fisherman and pilot on the Bellona when she nears the coast to put Maturin ashore in France.
- Inigo Bernard: Wealthy Catalan merchant from Barcelona; member of Spanish intelligence service.
- Mr Pratt: Private investigator ("thief taker") of use to Sir Joseph, introduced in The Reverse of the Medal.
- Mr Brendan Lawrence: Lawyer for Aubrey settling the suits brought by the owners of the slave ships, and advisor to Maturin, introduced in The Reverse of the Medal.
- Garcia and two other Chileans: Representatives of the Chilean independence movement.
- Admiral Lord Keith: Commander-in-chief of the Mediterranean fleet.

== Ships ==
British

The Brest outer squadron:

- HMS Queen Charlotte - 104 gun three-decker flagship, vice-admiral of the white
- HMS Zealous - seventy-four gun two-decker
- HMS Bellona - seventy-four gun two-decker (also in Inner Squadron)
- HMS Monmouth - seventy-four gun two-decker
- HMS Naiad - frigate
- HMS Doris - frigate
- HMS Alexandria - frigate

The Brest inner squadron:

- HMS Ramillies
- HMS Aboukir
- HMS Phoebe - frigate
- HMS Nimble

Re-inforced with:

- HMS Grampus - fifty-gun two-decker
- HMS Scipion - seventy-four
- HMS Eurotas - thirty-eight gun frigate
- HMS Penelope - frigate

Funchal harbour, Madeira:

- HMS Pomone - thirty-eight, Captain Wrangham; Jack raises his broad pennant on her
- HMS Dover - thirty-two; troop-ship
- HMS Rainbow and HMS Ganymede - two corvettes (joined by HMS Briseis)
- HM Hired Ship Surprise - twenty-eight gun, privately owned by Maturin, at Shelmerston until the peace, and repairs at Plymouth.
- Ringle - Baltimore clipper, privately owned by Aubrey, used as Bellona's tender by Aubrey

Others:

- HMS Dryad - thirty-six gun frigate
- HMS Achates - sixteen-gun sloop

French

- Les Deux Frères - heavily armed privateer
- Clorinde - frigate
- two seventy-four gun ships

== Series chronology ==
This novel references actual events with accurate historical detail, like all in this series. In respect to the internal chronology of the series, it is the first to line up with historical years, as the first six novels did. Then follow eleven novels beginning with The Surgeon's Mate that might take five or six years to happen but are all pegged to an extended 1812. As Patrick O'Brian says it, consider an 1812a and 1812b, in the introduction to The Far Side of the World, the tenth novel in this series. The events of The Yellow Admiral again match up with the historical events of the Napoleonic wars.

== Reviews ==
Kirkus Reviews found this novel to be "Another excellent adventure, complete with period-piece arcana, for oceanic literature's oddest and arguably most appealing couple.

The Telegraph called The Yellow Admiral "an interim novel" with the best bits in the relations between Aubrey and his wife. Prior novels in this series with portions of the story on land are better when "animated by Maturin's intelligence work." The Telegraph finds the topic of protecting his local common from inclosure "by a scheming neighbour is pedestrian in comparison." Even Maturin's wife Diana seems flat in this novel. Aboard ship, the plot revives, "the death of a midshipman has the authentic O'Brian tang of shocking maritime violence mingled with tenderness."

In a similar vein, while reviewing a later book in the series, John Casey writing in The Washington Post said: "Among O'Brian's fans there was some disquiet when The Yellow Admiral came out. It seemed more diffuse than the earlier installments."

Terry Teachout writing in The New York Times said he felt "vaguely disappointed by the last three or four installments of the Aubrey-Maturin chronicle, . . . but that The Yellow Admiral, while somewhat predictable, is nonetheless full of life." Viewing the series as a whole, Teachout had two views: the novels "are by a long shot the best things of their kind, so much better than the competition that comparisons long ago ceased to be relevant: they are uniquely excellent, and deserve the widest possible audience." On the other hand, he said, "Fine as they are, these books are of their kind: brilliant entertainments, rich in implication and almost certainly of permanent interest, yet not quite up to the mark set by Austen and Trollope."

Publishers Weekly found splendid storytelling from a true master, specifically "O'Brian is at the top of his elegant form here." They highlighted Aubrey's challenges in the blockade and with his wife; Maturin scheming with Chilean independence leaders; and the "wealth of sly humor (Navy officers' talk is "really not fit for mixed company because of its profoundly nautical character"), some splendid set pieces (a bare-knuckle boxing match, lively sea actions), characters who are palpably real and, as always, lapidary prose."

John Balzar writing in the Los Angeles Times said that ″Essential to the gift he (O'Brian) gives is authenticity″. He commented on the series, the "most improbably wonderful series of grown-up literary-historical flights of escapism." The plots, including the plot of this novel, are of less importance to Balzar, as they "are like grapes to wine: pretty much essential, but not by themselves sublime." He finds that the writing shows its virtuosity "when a sip of the story actuates the senses and stirs cravings that become habits, no matter where you find yourself being taken."

Jonathan Yardley of The Washington Post felt that O'Brian was taking his readers for granted in this novel, which was "written for cultists rather than to bring new readers aboard." Yardley did commend O'Brian's style; "characteristically wry, understated fashion, a style that has much to do with his popularity."

== Allusion to real events and persons in history ==
The Royal Navy had a system of rising through the ranks once a man made Post Captain. As he moved up the list of seniority, if he lived, he would become a Rear Admiral, with a squadron to command. As the Royal Navy grew with the long wars against Napoleon, a break in that practice left some post captains as retired, instead of promoted, or promoted but without a squadron in the Blue, White or Red, hence a yellow admiral. This is what Aubrey feared, taking that as an insult to his life in the Royal Navy with a long record of successes in battles.

Napoleon was losing and winning battles on the ground in 1813 and early 1814, but his western flank was weak, and Wellington's army had crossed Portugal and Spain, in April taken Toulouse on its way to Paris. Napoleon agreed to exile on the isle of Elba in April 1814, as its emperor. He slipped off the island about ten months later on 26 February 1815, landing on the coast of France a few days later. He was met by the Fifth Regiment of France south of Grenoble on 7 March 1815; they chose to join forces with him as he marched to Paris.

== Publication history ==
- Audio Edition Recorded Books, LLC; Unabridged Audio edition narrated by Patrick Tull (ISBN 1419341170)
- E-book edition, W. W. Norton & Company, 2011, ISBN 978-0-393-06371-4
