= Jack Aubrey =

Fictional character by Patrick O'Brian

John "Jack" Aubrey
- First appearance: Master and Commander
- Last appearance: 21 or The Final Unfinished Voyage of Jack Aubrey
- Created by: Patrick O'Brian
- Portrayed by: Russell Crowe (film); Michael Troughton (BBC Radio); David Robb (BBC Radio)

In-universe information
- Nicknames: Lucky Jack, Goldilocks
- Title: Rear Admiral
- Occupation: Naval Officer
- Family: General Aubrey (father); Philip Aubrey (half-brother)
- Spouse: Sophia "Sophie" Williams
- Children: Charlotte; Fanny; George; Sam Panda
- Relatives: Several

John "Jack" Aubrey CB MP JP FRS, is a fictional character in the Aubrey–Maturin series of novels by Patrick O'Brian. The series of novels portrays his rise from lieutenant to rear admiral in the Royal Navy during the Napoleonic Wars. The twenty (and one incomplete draft) book series encompasses Aubrey's adventures and various commands along his course to flying a rear admiral's flag.

Some of his naval battles and adventures are drawn from Royal Navy history. Several of his exploits and reverses, most importantly those in the plots of Master and Commander, The Reverse of the Medal and Blue at the Mizzen, are directly based on the chequered career of Thomas Cochrane. Often in the other 17 novels in the series, Aubrey may witness an action or hear of one that is drawn from history, while the battles or other encounters with ships he captains are fictional.

Besides reaching the peak of naval skills and authority, Aubrey is presented as being interested in mathematics and astronomy, a great lover of music and player of the violin, a hearty singer and is generally accompanied by his friend and shipmate Stephen Maturin on the cello. He is noted for his mangling and mis-splicing of proverbs, sometimes with Maturin's involvement, such as "Never count the bear's skin before it is hatched" and "There's a good deal to be said for making hay while the iron is hot."

Aubrey is played by Russell Crowe in the 2003 film Master and Commander: The Far Side of the World and by Michael Troughton and David Robb in the BBC Radio 4 adaptations of the novels.

== Education and early life ==
Aubrey's mother died when he was a boy; he was her only child. His father General Aubrey lives a longer life, and is a character in some of the novels, often working against the career interest of his son with clumsy politics. Eventually, when Jack is an adult, General Aubrey marries for a second time to a dairy maid, and fathers Philip Aubrey, who is a much younger half-brother to Jack. In Master and Commander, Aubrey describes the efforts of his slightly older neighbour "Queeney" to teach him some Latin and the mathematics associated with a sailing ship and its navigation so that he could pass his examination for lieutenant, an event that happened before the first novel. Queeney's family had occupied Damplow when Aubrey was a boy, a house adjoining General Aubrey's estate ("they were almost in our park").

Queeney appears in Aubrey's life when she marries Lord Keith, who heads up the Mediterranean Fleet of the Royal Navy. In the first novel, Lord Keith gave him his promotion to master and commander and his first command, and Lord Keith is married to Queeney at that time. Queeney is the historic Hester Maria Elphinstone, Viscountess Keith, and in Queeney's mother the reader will recognise the historic Hester Thrale.

== Early career ==
Like many officers in the British fleet, Aubrey spent much of his life raised on the sea, joining the navy very early: he was on the books at the age of nine and at sea when he was twelve. While a midshipman aboard HMS Resolution commanded by a friend of General Aubrey's, Captain Douglas, Jack was turned before the mast for hiding a girl aboard the ship, and for stealing the captain's dinner of tripe. He spent six months as a common seaman before being re-rated as a midshipman. This was when Lord Keith was still Captain Elphinstone, therefore pre-1797.

Aubrey also spent some time as fifth lieutenant aboard HMS Hannibal (in service 1786–1801), under Captain John Newman. There, after insulting the first lieutenant, he was put in front of a board, with Lord Keith upon it, which reprimanded him for his "petulance," which led to Aubrey spending eight months ashore with half pay.

While second lieutenant aboard HMS Foudroyant (1798), Aubrey was the leader of the prize crew for the Généreux after it was captured by Nelson's fleet in 1800. He earned a silver Nile Medal, having served as a lieutenant aboard HMS Leander during the Battle of the Nile in 1798, mentioned in Master and Commander. The Nile Medal is mentioned whenever Aubrey wears his dress uniform. The Battle of the Nile was a major turning point in the long wars between the United Kingdom and Napoleon's France, in which dominance on the sea went to the United Kingdom. Horatio Nelson became a hero for his role in that 1798 battle.

== Career and characteristics depicted in the novels ==
Aubrey is between twenty and thirty years old when the first story opens, a lieutenant passing time on the island of Minorca, at a musical performance. When he returns to his inn, his letter of promotion to master and commander awaits him. He is given his first command: a fourteen-gun brig-rigged sloop, HMS Sophie. He rises to the rank of post captain, though he is once struck off the Navy List, reinstated, then suspends himself in 1814 as peace comes in spring. As was the practice in the Royal Navy, once on the list of post captains, he moved up the list for promotion to admiral by the end of the series of novels, set during the Napoleonic Wars.

In his early career, according to HMS Surprise, Aubrey was not a skilled mathematician. In that book, he is described as learning mathematics and "...he studied the mathematics, and like some other late-developers he advanced at a great pace." In later books, Aubrey is presented as interested and skilled in mathematics and astronomy. He is also a great lover of music and player of the violin; he is a hearty singer. He is a man of even temperament, generally cheerful, sociable and alert to the feelings of his shipmates. He knows every aspect of the ships he sails and how best to gain speed over the oceans from each one by use of the sails without putting too much stress on the masts or yards (which would then break), a complex and hard-earned knowledge. He has been described as "the bluff and ultracompetent Aubrey". He feels the joy of battle; he is skilled in planning his attacks and in carrying them out, using cannon or hand-to-hand fighting. By contrast, he cannot watch his close friend, Dr Maturin, perform a surgery, and is sickened at the sight of blood on Maturin, the natural result of performing surgeries. On board ship, Aubrey on his violin is generally accompanied by his friend and shipmate Stephen Maturin on the cello. Aubrey is particularly fond of the music of Corelli and Boccherini. He is noted for his mangling and mis-splicing of proverbs, sometimes with Maturin's involvement, such as "Never count the bear's skin before it is hatched" and "There's a good deal to be said for making hay while the iron is hot."

Maturin enters actively into the humour of fractured proverbs by the eighth novel, The Ionian Mission, as shown in this exchange between the two friends in Chapter 10: "'Why, as to that,' said Jack, blowing on his coffee-cup and staring out of the stern-window at the harbour, 'as to that ... if you do not choose to call him a pragmatical clinchpoop and kick his breech, which you might think ungenteel, perhaps you could tell him to judge the pudding by its fruit.' 'You mean, prove the tree by its eating.' 'No, no, Stephen, you are quite out: eating a tree would prove nothing. And then you might ask him, had he ever seen many poltroons in the Navy?' 'I am not quite sure what you mean by poltroons.'"

Aubrey frequently mentions his respect of Lord Nelson, repeating a line he heard him say at a dinner in his early life in the navy, "Never mind manoeuvres, always go at them," in Chapter 3 of Master and Commander and in many of the subsequent novels, then quoted by Tom Pullings as "Never mind manoeuvres, always go straight at them." In one of his letters to his wife written from Boston, when Aubrey has a wounded right arm and can write to her only with his left hand, he couches this news of his injury to her as part of his desire to imitate Nelson in all things, except matrimonially, in Chapter 4 of The Fortune of War.

He enjoys the company of women. From the incident of keeping a girl aboard ship in his youth, unbeknownst to him, she was pregnant when he sailed away. Their son, Samuel Panda, appears in Aubrey's life fully grown and educated, a dark-skinned version of himself, but a Catholic priest. Before he knew of this young man, Aubrey married Sophia Williams, whom he met and courted in the peace of 1802, when he was on land. They married and had three children, twin daughters Fanny and Charlotte, and a son George. He loves his family, though most of the time he is away on a ship.

When his father dies, Jack Aubrey inherits the Aubrey family estate and the role of lord of the manor in The Letter of Marque. He displays extensive knowledge of the laws and practices surrounding that role in The Yellow Admiral, when he opposes enclosing the only commons left to the manor. His good connections with his neighbours in Woolcombe gain him a seat in Parliament from the pocket borough held by his neighbour Cousin Edward Norton; gaining that seat aided in his restoration to the Navy List. He sits as justice of the peace for certain local matters. This knowledge and well-tempered judgement seems to match with his skill in running a tight ship, a happy ship, and is a contrast to his financial faux pas. He can earn the money by taking rich prizes, but only with the help of his wife's good management and his lawyer's persistence at winning in lawsuits meant to take it from him, does the money stay in his hands for good uses.

== Watches real battles, fights fictional battles ==
Aubrey is a prisoner of war with a perfect view of the naval battle in Algeciras Bay in Master and Commander. He is a passenger aboard HMS Java when she is captured by USS Constitution in The Fortune of War. Again a prisoner of war, Aubrey arrives in Boston aboard USS Constitution. He heals from a serious wound in Boston. He, Maturin and Diana Villiers escape aboard HMS Shannon, which defeats USS Chesapeake in Boston Harbor as part of the War of 1812, also in The Fortune of War. The battles in which Aubrey participates are inspired by real ship engagements, but not involving the same ships by name, or sometimes by exact date of the real encounter. An example of this is Aubrey's first command, HMS Sophie, taking a far heavier Spanish frigate with 32 12-pound guns to the Sophie's 14 4-pounders and a crew of 319 compared to 56, which is very similar to an encounter of HMS Speedy under Cochrane in May 1801.

The taking of the two islands in The Mauritius Command is closely based on the actual Mauritius campaign of 1809–1811, and the encounter with the Spanish ships carrying gold from their South American colonies that closes the story in Post Captain, with Aubrey in temporary command of one of the British ships, closely matches the Battle of Cape Santa Maria, including the names of the British and Spanish ships in the encounter.

Most of his naval battles and adventures are drawn from actual Royal Navy history. Several of his exploits and reverses, most importantly those in the plots of Master and Commander, The Reverse of the Medal and Blue at the Mizzen, are directly based on the chequered career of Thomas Cochrane: as his friend the botanist and surgeon Stephen Maturin mused, "There was something of Cochrane in Jack, a restless impatience of authority, a strong persuasion of being in the right."

== Ships commanded by Jack Aubrey ==
During the series of novels, Jack Aubrey commands a succession of many different vessels. Most of them are warships of the Royal Navy, prefixed HMS (His Majesty's Ship). On one occasion he commands an Honourable East India Company ship, and for some time after she is sold out of the service, the Surprise is a hired vessel working for the Royal Navy (HMHV), having been purchased by Stephen Maturin. The Franklin is a privateer Jack Aubrey captures and uses for a brief time before he sells it. The status of the Nutmeg of Consolation is undefined, as she belongs to Stamford Raffles, the Governor of Batavia. Although the names and characteristics of real Royal Navy ships are used in the novels, the ships often do not take the same cruises or appear in the same battles as they did in history. In his first memorable success, he uses the smaller HM Sloop Sophie to take a larger Spanish vessel. The battle action is based on Cochrane's similar feat as captain of the HM Sloop Speedy in 1800.

Ship	Rate	Guns	Main armament	Book	Notional year	End of commission	Fictional?
HM Sloop Sophie	Brig-Sloop	14	4 lb	Master and Commander	1800	Captured	Yes
HM Sloop Polychrest	Sloop	24	32 lb carronades	Post Captain	1803	Sunk in battle (structural failure)	Yes
HMS Lively	5th	38	18 lb	Post Captain	1804	Temporary command	No
HMS Surprise	6th	28	12 lb	HMS Surprise	1805	Paid off	No
HMS Boadicea	5th	38	18 lb	The Mauritius Command	1809	Transferred to Raisonnable	No
HMS Raisonnable	3rd	64	24 lb	The Mauritius Command	1809	Monsoon season; transferred back to Boadicea	No
HMS Leopard	4th	50	24 lb	Desolation Island	1811	Converted to transport	No
HM Sloop Ariel	Sloop	16	6 lb	The Surgeon's Mate	1813	Sunk after striking reef	No
HMS Worcester	3rd	74	32 lb	The Ionian Mission	1813	Converted to shear hulk following storm damage	Yes
HMS Surprise	6th	28	12 lb	The Ionian Mission	1813	Temporary command	No
HEICS Niobe			9 lb	Treason's Harbour	1813	Temporary command	Yes
HMS Surprise	6th	28	12 lb	The Far Side of the World	1813	Paid off, then sold out of service	No
HMS Diane	5th	32	18 lb	The Thirteen Gun Salute	1813	Grounded on a reef, then destroyed by storm	Yes
Nutmeg of Consolation	6th	20	32 lb carronades	The Nutmeg of Consolation	1813	Returned to governor, transferred to Surprise	Yes
HMHV Surprise	6th	28	12 lb	Clarissa Oakes	1813	Transferred himself to Franklin	No
Privateer Franklin		22	24 lb carronades	The Wine Dark Sea	1813	Transferred himself back to the Surprise	Yes
HMS Bellona	3rd	74	32 lb	The Commodore; The Yellow Admiral	1813	Paid off	No
HMS Pomone	5th	38	18 lb	The Hundred Days	1815	Transferred to HMS Surprise	No
HMS Surprise	6th	28	12 lb	The Hundred Days	1815	Damaged in collision, then sent in for repairs	No
HMHV Surprise	6th	28	12 lb	Blue at the Mizzen	1815	Promoted: raised Flag on HMS Suffolk	No
HMS Suffolk	3rd	74	32 lb	The Final Unfinished Voyage of Jack Aubrey	1817	Sold in 1816	No

== Awards and rewards ==
Aubrey earned the silver Nile medal and wore it on his dress uniform always (mentioned in nearly every novel when the dress uniform is donned). He earned it as a lieutenant in an action before the series began, in the 1798 Battle of the Nile. His portrait was painted to hang at home, showing him wearing the red ribbon of the Order of the Bath, described at the start of Desolation Island, after he returned from great success in The Mauritius Command. The Order of the Bath at that date was an order of knighthood and the recipient would invariably be titled "Sir" unless they had a higher title. However, O'Brian never refers to Aubrey as Sir John, nor does the author have any other character refer to him as Sir John, in any of the novels.

He also received an elaborate diamond chelengk, earned in The Ionian Mission from the Turks, and mentioned in Treason's Harbour as having been saved by Killick. He has a Lloyd's 100-guinea presentation sword, mentioned in the start of The Reverse of the Medal and in The Nutmeg of Consolation. The Order of the Bath ribbon is again mentioned in the unfinished novel The Final Unfinished Voyage of Jack Aubrey, when Aubrey is about to step aboard the ship flying his broad pennant as Rear Admiral of the Blue.

Aubrey is described with his military awards at the start of The Reverse of the Medal.

Grateful owners of merchant ships honoured Aubrey with gifts of silver plate and cash when his efforts protected their ships and cargo. In HMS Surprise, the merchants in Calcutta pay to refit his ship. In The Letter of Marque, Aubrey receives a gift of silver plate from the merchants whose ships had been harried by a French-American privateer captured by the Surprise, herself a British letter of marque.

== Heraldry ==
The Aubreys were an old land holding family who owned various, though untitled, lordships of the manor. Their arms were azure, 3 sheep's heads erased, proper. In addition, Jack was granted the augmentation of 2 Moors' heads, proper, on this arms in honour of his success in the Mauritius campaign.

The complete achievement below shows Jack's awards: the silver Nile medal awarded by his hero Admiral Nelson and the insignia of a Knight Grand Cross of the Order of the Bath, which he is entitled to as he was given the Bath for the Mauritius Campaign (notional year above 1809) and so before the reorganization of the Order in 1815. Due to the reorganization in 1815, the existing Knights Companion (of which there were 60) became Knight Grand Cross. Knights Grand Cross and Knights Commander, as the earlier pre-1815 knights, have the privilege of prefixing "Sir" to their forenames. Wives of these Knights may prefix "Lady" to their surnames. However, neither Jack nor Sophie were ever called "Sir" or "Lady" in the novels. Knights Grand Cross are also entitled to receive heraldic supporters. O'Brian never mentioned any supporters for Jack's arms. Furthermore, knights grand cross may encircle their arms with a depiction of the circlet (a red circle bearing the motto) with the badge pendant and the collar; the former is shown either outside or on top of the latter. Also shown are crossed anchors and crossed flags representing Jack's rank in the Royal Navy, the right flag showing his final rank in the books as Rear Admiral of the Blue.

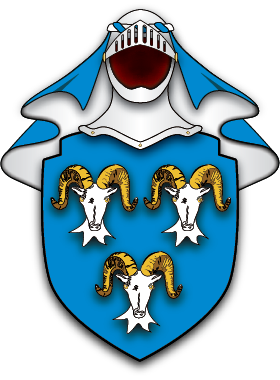
Arms of the Aubrey Family described in Desolation Island

Achievement of Rear Admiral Sir Jack Aubrey.

== Portrayed in adaptations of the novels ==
Jack Aubrey is played by Russell Crowe in the 2003 film Master and Commander: The Far Side of the World. He is played by David Robb in the BBC Radio 4 adaptations of the novels and by Michael Troughton in the BBC Radio 4 six-part adaption Master and Commander (1995).
