= The Commodore (O'Brian novel) =

1995 novel by Patrick O'Brian

- First edition cover
- Author: Patrick O'Brian
- Cover artist: Geoff Hunt
- Language: English
- Series: Aubrey-Maturin series
- Genre: Historical novel
- Publisher: HarperCollins (UK)
- Publication date: 1994
- Publication place: United Kingdom
- Media type: Print (Hardback & Paperback) & Audio Book (Compact audio cassette, Compact Disc)
- Pages: 281
- ISBN: 0-002-55550-6 first UK edition, hardback
- OCLC: 31970137
- Dewey Decimal: 823/.914 20
- LC Class: PR6029.B55 C66 1995
- Preceded by: The Wine-Dark Sea
- Followed by: The Yellow Admiral

The Commodore is the seventeenth historical novel in the Aubrey-Maturin series by British author Patrick O'Brian, first published in 1995. The story is set during the Napoleonic Wars and the War of 1812.

In this novel, Aubrey and Maturin complete their circumnavigation of the globe begun in The Thirteen Gun Salute and continued through The Nutmeg of Consolation, Clarissa Oakes/The Truelove, and The Wine-Dark Sea. After a long-awaited stay at home in England, Commodore Aubrey is given a squadron to conduct a mission against slave ships in West Africa and then he and Maturin are sent against Napoleon's Navy. Dr Maturin finally meets his young daughter, whom he must protect from a vicious enemy agent out to get him through his family. The story ranges from England to Spain to West Africa and the rocky west coast of Ireland.

Reviewers of this novel were impressed with how well the characters were drawn, if you met them, "you'd know them". What keeps one reading is the "improbable, delightful friendship between the two men" With part of the story on land, dealing with family issues, the impeccable writing marks O'Brian as the heir "of Jane Austen herself." Reardon remarked the strengths of this novel thus: "The book is not so much about battle, although there are some battles. It is not so much about history, although it is filled with the real stuff of the past. It is not even, in the end, about sailing, although it captures with unique clarity the terrible beauty and wondrous excitement, the deep awe and hard work, that are so much the experience of keeping a ship afloat and on its voyage."

== Plot summary ==
Jack Aubrey wins the Ringle, a Baltimore Clipper, from his friend Captain Dundas, as the Surprise accompanies HMS Berenice back to England, after a stop on Ascension Island for repairs to the Surprise. Maturin meets with Sir Joseph Blaine, while Aubrey heads home to his family. When Maturin does reach home with Sarah and Emily, he finds his young daughter Brigid in the care of Clarissa Oakes, now widowed. He searches for his wife, but finds only some of her horses. Their daughter's language and social skills are developing slowly.

When Maturin meets Sir Joseph at their club, he learns that the Duke of Habachtsthal, the third conspirator in the Ledward-Wray conspiracy, is aiming at both of them. The Duke's influence has delayed the pardons of both Clarissa and Padeen, and all are at risk. To secure his fortune and his family, Maturin asks Aubrey for the Ringle to move his cash to Corunna and to carry Clarissa, Padeen and Brigid to live at the Benedictine house in Ávila, Spain, for safety. Brigid takes to Padeen, and is speaking in Irish and English aboard the Ringle. Blaine and Maturin separately hire Mr Pratt, to gather information on the Duke and to find Diana.

Aubrey gets orders to command a squadron of ships, a position which earns him promotion to commodore. The mission to disrupt the African slave trade, which is illegal under British law since 1807, is bruited in the English newspapers to be sure the French know of it. The second, secret mission of the squadron is to intercept a French squadron aimed at Ireland, hoping for better success than in 1796–97. Two of the ships in the squadron have captains not up to Aubrey's standards: Duff in HMS Stately disrupts discipline, while Thomas of HMS Thames is not ready for battle. Tom Pullings is the full captain of the flagship HMS Bellona, where Aubrey stays and Maturin is surgeon. The Ringle meets the squadron at the Berlings off Peniche peninsula. The squadron sails to Freetown to begin the first mission, practising gunnery and other naval skills en route. Aubrey is in a bad mood, felt throughout the ships, until Maturin tells him that Pastor Hinksey is to be married and set up in India; jealousy had gnawed at him.

Aubrey devises a scheme using the smaller vessels in the squadron to surprise each slave port up to the Bight of Benin. This successfully disrupts the slave trade, and saves over 6,000 slaves. Aubrey ends short of Whydah, as news of the squadron's success empties that harbour. They take eighteen slave ships as prizes, first taking the Nancy, and using the empty ship for target practice to good effect in Freetown. The success is not without loss of men to disease and attack. Maturin survives a bout of yellow fever contracted while botanising on Philip's Island with Mr Square. As he recuperates, they stop at St Thomas island for medical supplies; two officers (one from Stately, one from Thames) step ashore for a duel by guns, each fatally wounded, resolving nothing. They reach Freetown again, now in the Harmattan, which is the dry season. The British colonial governor's wife invites Maturin to dinner; he is friends with her brother and both are esteemed naturalists. Maturin leaves the potto he had aboard in her care.

Aubrey hastens to meet the French squadron, commanded by the wily Commodore Esprit-Tranquille Maistral, waiting south and east of the point the French are expected to meet the Caesar arriving from America. Caesar fails to arrive, so they proceed northeast to Ireland. The Bellona attacks the French pennant-ship, while the Thames and Stately attack the other French two-decker ship. The first strikes on a rocky shelf and surrenders; the second badly mauls the Stately and flees eastwards. Thames is stuck in a reef. HMS Royal Oak and Warwick handle the four French troop carriers and one frigate, which are penned in a cove. They join the scene of battle, having heard the gunfire. Bellona is taking water and Aubrey is glad for the help. The other French frigate slips away. Ashore, Maturin speaks to the Irishmen who want the guns aboard the foundered ship. He and Father Boyle persuade them this is not the moment, as anyone found with the French guns by the British will be hanged. After tending the wounded, Maturin learns from his friend Roche that the flags are at half-staff on account of the death of a minor royal, the Duke of Habachtsthal, who has committed suicide. Maturin, pleased at the news, proceeds to the home of Colonel Villiers, a relative of Diana's late husband with whom she is now staying, where he and Diana are happily reunited.

== Characters ==
See also Recurring characters in the Aubrey–Maturin series

Return to England

- Jack Aubrey: Appointed Commodore in the Royal Navy.
- Stephen Maturin: Surgeon of the Bellona, physician, natural philosopher, friend to Jack and an intelligence officer.
- Heneage Dundas: Captain of HMS Berenice, brother to the first Sea Lord, and friend of Aubrey.
- Preserved Killick: Aubrey's steward.
- Barret Bonden: Coxwain for Aubrey.
- Mr David Adams: Captain's clerk on Surprise, then Secretary for the Commodore on Bellona.
- Padeen Colman: Irish servant to Maturin.
- Sarah and Emily Sweeting: Melanesian girls rescued earlier by Maturin (in The Nutmeg of Consolation), rated as ships boys; set up in The Grapes under Mrs Broad's care.
- Duke of Habachtsthal: Minor royalty in the British line, with property in a German state (held by the French) and in Ireland, and last man of three leaking British information to the French. He kills himself at the end of this story.
- Awkward Davies: Able seaman.
- Joe Plaice: Able seaman and cousin to Bonden.
- Fellowes: Captain of HMS Thunderer.
- Mr Philips: Admiralty officer aboard the Thunderer with a message for Maturin.
- Sophia Aubrey: Wife of Jack and mother of their three children.
- Fannie and Charlotte Aubrey: Twin daughters of Jack and Sophia.
- George Aubrey: Young son of Jack and Sophia.
- Mrs Williams: Mother of Sophia and aunt to Diana Villiers, a mean and gossiping woman, trying to interfere with Brigid's upbringing.
- Mrs Selina Morris: Friend and companion to Mrs Williams, of the same character.
- Mr Briggs: Servant to Mrs Morris and money man for her and Mrs Williams, as the three take bets on horses.
- Diana Villiers: Stephen's wife and mother of their child.
- Clarissa Oakes: Young gentlewoman, widow of Lieutenant William Oakes, now part of Maturin's household, introduced in Clarissa Oakes.
- Brigid Maturin: Young daughter of Stephen and Diana, showing developmental problems, until Padeen enters her life; nickname Brideen.
- Aunt Petronilla: Aunt to Maturin who heads a Benedictine convent in Avila, where his daughter, Clarissa and Padeen will stay.
- Mr Hinksey: Priest for the parish including Ashgrove Cottage, helpful to Mrs Aubrey, and about to be married.
- Sir Joseph Blaine: Head of Intelligence at the Admiralty, naturalist who studies beetles, and friend of Maturin.
- Mr Pratt: Investigator ("thief taker") introduced in The Reverse of the Medal.
- Mr Brendan Lawrence: Lawyer for Aubrey, and advisor to Maturin in responding to the Duke, introduced in The Reverse of the Medal.
- Mnason: Jack's butler at Woolcombe.

At sea with the squadron

- William Smith: First assistant surgeon on Bellona, with experience in Bridgetown.
- Alexander Macaulay: Second assistant surgeon on Bellona, fresh from his training.
- Mr Wetherby: Youngster on Bellona.
- Mr William Reade: Midshipman, about age 15, on HMS Bellona, who lost an arm in battle; introduced in The Thirteen Gun Salute. He sails the Ringle, Aubrey's personally-owned tender, a fast-sailing Baltimore clipper.
- Mr Gray: First Lieutenant on the Bellona, who dies from infection after surgery.
- Mr William Harding: Second Lieutenant on the Bellona, moves up to first on the death of Mr Gray.
- Mr Whewell: Acting third Lieutenant on the Bellona, promoted from master's mate on the Aurora due to his knowledge relevant to the mission.
- John Paulton: Friend met in New South Wales who assisted in kinder treatment and escape of Padeen Colman in The Nutmeg of Consolation; his novel is published, and dedicated to Stephen Maturin, as reported by some in the squadron who read it.
- Mr Willoughby: Marine Lieutenant aboard HMS Stately, who is insulted at dinner by the 2nd Lieutenant of HMS Thames.
- William Duff: Captain of HMS Stately; he loses a leg in the action against the French squadron in Bantry Bay in Ireland.

Met at Freetown

- John Square: Krooman who assists Maturin during the first mission of the squadron.
- Houmouzios: Greek money lender in the market at Freetown who takes messages for Maturin.
- James Wood: Colonial Governor at Freetown in Sierra Leone with experience in the Royal Navy.
- Mrs Wood: Born Christine Hatherleigh, she is the sister of Edward, who is an eminent naturalist. She shares her brother's interest and knowledge.

Met in West Cork

- Esprit-Tranquille Maistral: Commodore of the French squadron headed to Bantry Bay in West Cork in Ireland.
- Mr Frank Geary: Captain of HMS Warwick, posted at Bere Haven, which they left on hearing reports of gunfire.
- Father Boyle: Ashore in Ireland where the French ship grounded, he aids in bringing the wounded to hospitals on land.
- Stanislas Roche: Local man in West Cork, old friend to Maturin, who explains why the flags are at half-mast, and takes him where Diana Villiers is staying, at the home of a relative of her late husband.

Squadron leaders

- Captain Tom Pullings: Bellona
- Captain William Duff: Stately
- Captain Thomas (nicknamed the Purple Emperor): Thames
- Captain Francis Howard: Aurora
- Captain Michael Fitton: Nimble
- Captain Smith: Camilla
- Dick Richardson (introduced in The Mauritius Command): Laurel

== Ships ==
British

- HM Hired Vessel Surprise – Twenty-eight gun frigate
- HMS Berenice – Sixty-four gun two decker
- HMS Thunderer – Seventy-four gun two decker

Jack Aubrey's squadron:

- HMS Bellona – Seventy-four gun; broadside weight of 926 pounds; crew of 590
- HMS Stately – Sixty-four; broadside weight of 792 pounds
- HMS Thames – Thirty-two gun, 12-pounder; broadside weight of 300 pounds
- HMS Aurora – A twenty-four gun, 9-pounder; crew of 196
- HMS Nimble – A cutter
- HMS Camilla – Twenty-gun ship
- HMS Laurel - twenty-two guns, new sixth rate
- HMS Orestes– Brig-rigged sloop
- Ringle – Baltimore clipper, tender to Dundas on Berenice then to Aubrey on Bellona

Arrive upon hearing the gunfire in Bere Haven, Ireland

- HMS Royal Oak – Seventy-four gun
- HMS Warwick – Seventy-four gun
- Frigate in company

Slave ship

- Nancy

French

- Two ships of the line with seventy-four guns
- Caesar, seventy-four guns, missed her rendezvous
- Two frigates, one with thirty six guns, the other with thirty-two guns, all eighteen pounder
- Four troop carriers
- Marie-Paule, privateer that threatens Ringle before the landing in Corunna

== Series chronology ==
This novel references actual events with accurate historical detail, like all in this series. In respect to the internal chronology of the series, it is the last of eleven novels (beginning with The Surgeon's Mate) that might take five or six years to happen but are all pegged to an extended 1812, or as Patrick O'Brian says it, 1812a and 1812b (introduction to The Far Side of the World, the tenth novel in this series). The events of The Yellow Admiral again match up with the historical years of the Napoleonic wars in sequence, as the first six novels did.

== Reviews ==
Kirkus Reviews has strong words of praise for a mesmerising performance on many levels, with direct links to Jane Austen's novel Perusasion as to the domestic lives of the main characters, and a writing style marking O'Brian as the heir "of Jane Austen herself." The story has a section on land with "the perils of domesticity" as challenges, as well as the dual mission at sea. They particularly noted "Maturin's enlightened 18th-century speculations on love, sex, and politics".

Publishers Weekly notes the amount of domestic life in this novel, told with great historical and nautical accuracy. Both Aubrey and Maturin undertake the naval mission with "clouds" from their family affairs.

Joel White, writing in the New York Times, says that compared to some of the earlier novels, The Commodore is "relatively peaceful compared with the usual Patrick O'Brian offering" as to battles. On the other hand, he remarks that "it is not the sea battles that keep us turning the pages, but rather the improbable, delightful friendship between the two men as well as their relationships with their families and shipmates." The main characters "are complex men, expertly portrayed", and both leave home for their naval mission unhappy due to family concerns. The naval mission begins on the west coast of Africa to intercept slave ships, the trade already outlawed in England, then moves on to surprise a French expedition. That comes to a conclusion that makes "all right with the world, and the opportunity open for another book to come."

Patrick Reardon writing in the Chicago Tribune notes the well-drawn characters, so clear that "you'd know them" if you met them. Further, The Commodore is a worthy successor to the 16 earlier Aubrey-Maturin novels that O'Brian, now in his 80s, has written over the past two decades. The book is not so much about battle, although there are some battles. It is not so much about history, although it is filled with the real stuff of the past. It is not even, in the end, about sailing, although it captures with unique clarity the terrible beauty and wondrous excitement, the deep awe and hard work, that are so much the experience of keeping a ship afloat and on its voyage." "The Commodore, like its predecessors, is about people, seen deep within the context of the exotic and mundane events of their lives."

== Publication history ==
- Recorded Books, LLC; Unabridged Audio edition narrated by Patrick Tull (ISBN 1419320882)
- E-book edition, W. W. Norton & Company, 2011 (ISBN 9780393088489)

== References to actual history ==
The book makes reference to the West African slave trade and the Slave Trade Act 1807. The Act made smugglers of slave traders, putting them at risk of seizure by the Royal Navy. As described in the novel, the slaves removed from the slave ships were not returned to their birthplace or place of seizure, but brought to Freetown in Sierra Leone, where they were not subject to re-capture. Aubrey's first sight of slaves aboard a ship designed for that trade deeply affected him, though he did not share Maturin's fierce abolitionist views, a way to depict the long struggle to end slavery in the UK and its colonies and territories. The ship Nancy as described in the novel is quite similar to the British ship Brookes as to the space allotted for the human cargo.

Aubrey is promoted to Commodore, the first flag officer rank. He has a captain under him, so he wears the uniform of a Rear Admiral. This rank came into formal existence in the Royal Navy in 1805, before the setting of this novel, about 1812 or 1813.

== How the Baltimore clipper came to O'Brian's attention ==
Ken Ringle of The Washington Post interviewed Patrick O'Brian and kept up correspondence with him. Ringle learned that O'Brian did not know about the fast sailing type of vessel called the Baltimore clipper, a vessel used by the Americans in the War of 1812. He writes that after December 1992, "when I happened on a new book on Baltimore clippers, I picked up a copy to send him." Thus the vessel is named Ringle, and its amazing sailing properties well-described, and used for critical parts of the plot, like saving Maturin's family and fortune.
