= The Wine-Dark Sea =

1993 novel by Patrick O'Brian

- First edition cover
- Author: Patrick O'Brian
- Cover artist: Geoff Hunt
- Language: English
- Series: Aubrey-Maturin series
- Genre: Historical novel
- Published: 1993 HarperCollins (UK)
- Publication place: United Kingdom
- Media type: Print Hardback & Paperback & Audio Book Compact audio cassette, Compact Disc
- Pages: 261 first edition, hardback
- Awards: Heywood Hill Literary Prize
- ISBN: 0-393-03558-1
- OCLC: 27975129
- Dewey Decimal: 823/.914 20
- LC Class: PR6029.B55 W5 1993
- Preceded by: Clarissa Oakes
- Followed by: The Commodore

The Wine-Dark Sea is the sixteenth historical novel in the Aubrey-Maturin series by British author Patrick O'Brian, first published in 1993. The story is set during the Napoleonic Wars and the War of 1812.

This novel constitutes the fourth of a five-novel circumnavigation of the globe; other novels in this voyage include The Thirteen Gun Salute, The Nutmeg of Consolation, Clarissa Oakes/The Truelove, and The Commodore.

The chase of the Franklin brings the Surprise to Peru and the undercover mission so long delayed. Aubrey navigates through an undersea volcanic eruption, which decides him as winner of the chase. Captain Aubrey's illegitimate son, Father Panda, provides crucial help to Maturin in Lima and for his long walk along the Andes Mountains to meet the Surprise. Aubrey is unable to beat to windward during a hard blow while trying to reach Maturin to warn him of Dutourd's escape and is nearly starved.

This novel received enthusiastic positive reviews on its release. The writing is "literate, leisurely, and as charming as the rest of the series" while the story is "a real hair-raiser". Another review noted reading the novel "induces a rueful awe at the depth and intensity of the author's determination to make his characters authentic creatures of their time", and praises the "nuanced handling of everyone's political and religious beliefs and how these relate to the war they are fighting." The plot and the writing style were praised: "The naval actions are bang-on and bang-up--fast, furious and bloody--and the Andean milieu is as vivid as the shipboard scenes." It is this novel that elicited the observation that "The best way to think of these novels is as a single 5,000-page book." The battles are intense and the storms riveting, but it is the "meticulously recorded mundane moments of the story (and of the sea journey) that bring the novel to full life." Another reviewer quotes some of the dialogue between Aubrey and Maturin, and remarks that the "painstakingly researched details about 19th-Century life aboard ship, that elevates his tales into heady escapism. O'Brian won the Heywood Hill Literary Prize, with a cash award, for his writing and for this novel in 1995.

== Plot summary ==
The Surprise, with bow guns blazing, is in close pursuit of the American privateer Franklin in the wine-dark waters of the South Pacific. The chase is interrupted by a submarine volcanic eruption that completely disables the Franklin, with lesser damages to the Surprise. At sunrise, Aubrey sends Reade to take the Franklin; Maturin and Martin separate the dead from wounded aboard the prize. Jean Dutourd, the idealistic French owner, is taken aboard Surprise. A wealthy philanthropist, his plan to colonize a South Pacific island, Moahu, as a new utopian society with Franklins passengers as equal citizens was stopped by the appearance of the Surprise, and the Admiralty's support for the Queen of Moahu in a battle for supremacy on the island. The Franklin took prizes of British ships en route to Moahu, proved by ransomers aboard, seamen taken as security, along with cargoes taken. Franklins American sailing master was killed by shots from the Surprise. Aubrey finds that Dutourd does not have a letter of marque which would permit him to operate as a privateer. Although the sailing master did, but Dutourd is not listed on his muster. Absent the letter, Aubrey views Dutourd as a pirate, while Maturin considers his talkative nature a risk ashore to his mission. Aboard ship, Dutourd is allowed semi-free access and his utopian talk appeals to some of the seamen.

Surprise and Franklin, with Capt. Pullings, in command, take an American whaler as prize. An ex-British naval sailor on the whaler tells Aubrey of the Alastor, a privateer turned true pirate, flying the black flag and demanding immediate surrender or death of its victims. In their ultimately successful encounter with the Alastor, Aubrey receives severe wounds to his eye and his leg.

The ships reach Callao, the port for Lima. Maturin's mission begins now, done under cover of Surprise not being a Royal Navy ship, but perceived as a privateer, and she is again in this port with Pullings as her captain, with many prizes in tow. Maturin's goal is to assist the movement for independence of Peru from Spain, with aid from English gold as needed. Father Sam Panda is assigned here, and he proves a useful contact in Maturin's work. Another of Maturin's tasks ashore is to find suitable care for his longtime assistant, Nathaniel Martin, who is too ill for his work at sea. Maturin sees his old friend Dr Geary, surgeon of The Three Graces merchantman, who offers to take Martin home. Martin mistook salt sores (from a period of low fresh water aboard) to be the pox, treating himself with harsh medicines, which in turn made him truly ill. As the hospital in Callao is inadequate, Maturin yields up his patient to Geary.

Maturin meets with Gayongos, revolutionary sympathiser, and departs on a mule into the mountains, to meet with Father Don Jaime O'Higgins. The plan is agreed and will be set in motion in a couple of days. Gayongos reports at the Benedictine monastery that Dutourd is in Lima; Maturin says, let the Inquisition have him. Maturin sends a message to Pullings that he is gone botanizing in the mountains. He meets Eduardo, knowledgeable Inca guide, and the two trek in the higher altitudes. Eduardo receives a message from Gayongos that the revolution has failed before it began. Maturin must flee by land to Chile. Dutourd is arrested as a heretic, but the damage is done. When Aubrey discovers that Dutourd escaped, he sails in a cutter with a few crewmen to Callao to retake Dutourd or to warn Maturin. After many days of hard sailing against the wind, they reach the harbour and are taken aboard the Surprise by Captain Pullings barely alive. Aubrey welcomes Sam Panda who updates him on the political situation and the plan to meet with Maturin. Trekking over the Andes Mountains with llamas, Maturin and Eduardo are caught in a viento blanco (blizzard), their lives saved by the shelter Eduardo found, though Maturin loses some toes to frostbite.

Maturin makes his way to Arica with help from Eduardo, and then takes ship to Valparaíso, where Aubrey picks up Maturin and his collections. Maturin informs him of three American China ships sailing from Boston. The Surprise sails to intercept them off Cape Horn but, as she prepares to engage them, is herself fired upon by a thirty-eight gun US frigate and her brig. After a very close encounter with an ice island, the Surprise is again chased until her pursuer sails into a dead end in the ice field. The Surprise sails out, losing her main mast and rudder to a lightning strike. The crew of the jury-rigged Surprise spot a ship hull-down on the horizon. The ship, recognized by Maturin as having two rows of cannon, is HMS Berenice under Captain Heneage Dundas, accompanied by her tender, and carries Aubrey's much younger half-brother Philip. Dundas has provisions to repair the ship and pepper for Maturin to preserve his specimens from moths. Dundas has precious news from home, as he visited Ashgrove Cottage before he sailed, seeing Sophia and their children, but not Diana, only her horses. He met Clarissa Oakes there, who is now a widow. Aubrey and Maturin are happily homeward bound.

== Characters ==
See also Recurring characters in the Aubrey–Maturin series

- Jack Aubrey: Captain of HM Hired Vessel Surprise, and its owner.
- Stephen Maturin: Ship's surgeon, physician, natural philosopher, friend to Jack and an intelligence officer.
- Sophia Aubrey: Wife of Jack and mother of their three children.
- Diana Villiers: Wife of Stephen and mother of their young daughter Brigid.
- Clarissa Oakes: Living at the Aubrey home, widow of young Oakes; introduced in Clarissa Oakes.

The chase and the prizes

- Thomas Pullings: Commander in the Royal Navy, Captain by courtesy, he is a volunteer aboard Surprise. He acts as its first officer when Aubrey is aboard. He takes command of the Franklin when it is seized.
- Mr West: Second Mate on HM Hired Vessel Surprise. He had been a Royal Navy lieutenant, discharged for duelling, and would like to be one again. He is killed by the volcanic eruption. He was introduced in The Letter of Marque.
- Reverend Nathaniel Martin: assistant-surgeon, natural philosopher, clergyman and friend to Maturin. He becomes ill en route to Peru and is sent home from Callao on a merchantman to recover. He is a beneficed clergyman now, with two livings on Aubrey's holdings. He was introduced in The Ionian Mission.
- Mr William Reade: Midshipman, now age 14, on the Surprise who lost an arm in battle; introduced in The Thirteen Gun Salute. His voice is breaking now. With young Norton promoted to the midshipman's berth, he has a friend to go skylarking.
- Mr Sam Norton: Promoted to midshipman to fill the vacancy of Oakes, who sailed the prize Truelove from Moahu.
- Mr Arthur Wedell: Ransomer taken from the Franklin, who stays with the Surprise and is promoted to acting midshipman. He is near the age of Reade and very lively. The three midshipmen are punished after Wedell falls through the skylight into the Captain's cabin.
- Jean Dutourd: Owner of the Franklin, now a prisoner under Aubrey. He is an idealist and a talkative man, who planned to use Moahu to set up his notion of a utopian community. That plan is ended by the capture of his ship. He is considered a pirate by Aubrey but his talk attracts some of the crew, and later contributes to waylaying Maturin's mission.
- Mr William B Chauncy: The Sailing Master aboard the Franklin, who holds a letter of marque from the US, but does not list Dutourd on the muster. He is killed, along with all his skilled seamen, by a cannonball from the Surprise during the chase.
- Mr Bulkeley: Bosun on the Surprise. At Callao, Aubrey discharges him for capabarre, a habit he learned too well when in the Royal Navy.
- Barret Bonden: Captain's Coxswain on the Surprise.
- Preserved Killick: Captain's Steward on the Surprise.
- Awkward Davies: Able Seaman on the Surprise.
- Joe Plaice: Cousin to Bonden and able seaman.
- Mr Grainger: Acting mate or Lieutenant joining the Gun room. He is promoted from forecastleman due to vacancy from battle at Moahu; he sailed his own brig before joining Surprise at Shelmerston for this voyage (which began back in The Thirteen Gun Salute).
- Henry Vidal: Acting Second Lieutenant on the Surprise; by religion, he is a Knipperdolling from Shelmerston. While Maturin walks the Andes, he is put off the ship by Aubrey for having let Dutourd escape to shore.
- Ben Vidal: Nephew to Vidal who is taken on the cutter with Aubrey when trying to reach Callao to recapture Dutourd or warn Maturin.
- Mr Adams: Skilled captain's clerk.
- William Sadler: Replaces Vidal as acting second mate or lieutenant on Surprise.
- Sarah and Emily Sweeting: Melanesian girls rescued earlier by Maturin in The Nutmeg of Consolation, rated as ship's boys. Jemmy Ducks tends them and they work in the sick berth as well as help Maturin with his collections.
- Edward Shelton: One-time Royal Navy serving on the American whaler since the peace, joins Surprise as able, and shares information about the pirate ship with Aubrey.
- Fabien: Apothecary's assistant from New Orleans, was aboard the Franklin, taken by Maturin as an assistant in the sick bay and for drawings of fauna in his collections.
- Zeek: American whaler on the ship taken by Surprise, who killed his captain with the whaling spear, because he was about to abandon him in a small boat.

In Peru

- Dr Francis Geary: Surgeon of The Three Graces merchantman, once a classmate of Maturin, who agrees to care for Martin on their return to England.
- Sam Panda: Young Catholic priest, illegitimate son to Aubrey and now grown taller and larger than his father, raised by Irish missionaries in southern Africa, now a rising star in the Catholic church. Maturin is a good friend to him. Introduced in The Reverse of the Medal.
- Eduardo: Maturin's Inca guide in the Andes, notable naturalist, fluent in Spanish and Quechua.
- Don Jaime O'Higgins: Vicar-General in Peru, abolitionist and supporter of the split from Spain.
- Joselito: Mule belonging to Don Bernardo O'Higgins and loaned to Maturin for his botanizing walk.
- Pascual de Gayongos: Wealthy Catalan merchant and revolutionary sympathiser in Peru with whom Maturin makes a strong link. He supplies the boat to take Maturin from Arica along the coast near Valparaiso.
- General Hurtado: High-ranked Peruvian General who made the decision that the revolution could not proceed with the charges of foreign gold in the air.
- Castro: Low level official in Lima who is the unstable figure trying to gain benefit from Dutourd's noisy talk.

Howmeward bound

- Heneage Dundas: Captain of HMS Berenice and longtime friend of Aubrey.
- Philip Aubrey: Much younger half-brother of Jack, who has been sailing with Captain Dundas as a midshipman. His birth is mentioned in Post Captain.

== Ships ==
- British
  - HM Hired Vessel Surprise - an elderly twenty-eight gun frigate
  - The Three Graces merchantman
  - HMS Berenice - sixty-four-gun man-of-war
  - A Baltimore clipper (Berenice's tender), not named in this book but name given as Ringle in The Commodore
- French
  - Alastor - pirate ship
  - Alastor's launch - used by Aubrey to sail to Callao
- American
  - Franklin (captured)
  - American whaler - captured by the Surprise and Franklin
  - Nootka fur trader - captured by the Franklin
  - Unnamed thirty-eight gun frigate and brig in convoy

== Title ==
The novel's title is the English translation of an oft-repeated description from Homer. Example of Homer's verse: “And if some god should strike me, out on the wine-dark sea, I will endure it,”

== Series chronology ==
This novel references actual events with accurate historical detail, like all in this series. In respect to the internal chronology of the series, it is the tenth of eleven novels (beginning with The Surgeon's Mate) that might take five or six years to happen but are all pegged to an extended 1812, or as Patrick O'Brian says it, 1812a and 1812b (introduction to The Far Side of the World, the tenth novel in this series). The events of The Yellow Admiral again match up with the historical years of the Napoleonic wars in sequence, as the first six novels did.

== Continuity ==
In this novel, the voyage begun in The Thirteen Gun Salute, with a covert mission (first mentioned in The Reverse of the Medal) in Peru for Maturin, comes finally to Peru. Because of the demands of the Spanish government not to interfere with their colonies in South America, the Surprise sailed under Captain Pullings as a privateer, west to Peru, sailing until she met up with Aubrey in the Salibabu Passage in the South China Sea on the other side of the world. Aubrey and Maturin sailed on HMS Diane to complete a mission to the east, in Pulo Prabang and Maturin eliminates two traitors to the British cause. Aubrey sails again in the Surprise, sending the Nutmeg back to Batavia, where the Governor had given it to him (The Nutmeg of Consolation). Surprise proceeds to Australia, picking up a friend and a stowaway. The Governor at Sydney sends Aubrey on a mission to Moahu, successfully completed (Clarissa Oakes / The Truelove). Surprise chases and takes the American privateer Franklin in this novel, bringing Surprise to Peru, where Maturin's mission, so close to success, is jeopardized, and Maturin walks the Andes Mountains until he can reach the coast safely and rendezvous with Surprise. They sail around the Cape Horn, suffering damage from lightning, but meet with HMS Berenice, with supplies to repair her, and Aubrey and Maturin are ready to be home after the long voyage around the world.

== Reviews and awards ==
By the time of the publication of this novel by WW Norton jointly with HarperCollins, reviewers have read the series in order and have caught up with the plot, ending the confusion seen in reviews of novels earlier in the series, reviews written at the time of re-issue, not at first publication. There are more reviews in newspapers of note.

Kirkus Reviews said this novel is literate, leisurely, and as charming as the rest of the series. Sending Maturin to deal with the tottering Spanish vice regency in South America is a good choice, aboard the privateer Surprise. "Maturin's mission, complicated enough by the various revolutionary factions, becomes a real hair-raiser involving an arduous transit of the Andes, where he is spit on by llamas and sees the great condors."

Thomas Fleming writing in the New York Times noted that "O'Brian's persistence . . . eventually induces a rueful awe at the depth and intensity of the author's determination to make his characters authentic creatures of their time. It is life aboard the Surprise that mainly animates O'Brian. His narrative of the proto-revolution in Peru is sketchy at best. . . . This deficiency is more than balanced by the intricate intimacy with which the reader comes to know the Surprise. . . . Equally fine is O'Brian's nuanced handling of everyone's political and religious beliefs and how these relate to the war they are fighting."

Publishers Weekly remarks that If O'Brian hasn't quite had a break-out book yet, then this deserves to be it. In an enthusiastic review, they describe the writing: "The naval actions are bang-on and bang-up--fast, furious and bloody--and the Andean milieu is as vivid as the shipboard scenes. As usual, readers can revel in the symbiotic friendship of Jack and Stephen, who make for a marvelous duo, whether in their violin and cello duets or in their sharp dialogue."

Patrick T Reardon writing in the Chicago Tribune describes how the author brings this story to full life: "The best way to think of these novels is as a single 5,000-page book. But this is no overstuffed epic. It is, if you can imagine such a thing, an intimate book that just happens to be 5,000 pages long. . . . As usual, O'Brian's battle scenes are engrossing, and his storm chapters are even more riveting. But it's the in-between times, the closely observed and meticulously recorded mundane moments of the story (and of the sea journey) that bring the novel to full life."

Paul D Colford, writing in the Los Angeles Times, cites a quote from the story as an example of the fine prose and painstaking research by the author that elevates this book, and the series to a higher level.

Here, in The Wine-Dark Sea, are the two old friends as they puzzle from the quarterdeck at a "strange-coloured" swirling sea:

Aubrey: "I have never seen anything like it."
Maturin: "It is much thicker now than it was when I went below. And now an umber light pervades the whole, like a Claude Lorrain run mad."

It's this kind of passing historical reference (to the 17th-Century landscape artist known for his rendering of light), as well as O'Brian's painstakingly researched details about 19th-Century life aboard ship, that elevates his tales into heady escapism.

Author Patrick O'Brian won the Heywood Hill Literary Prize in 1995, the first such prize offered, for his literary contributions and this novel. In his acceptance speech in July 1995, O'Brian, then age 80, said it was the first literary prize of his adult life, in the amount of 10,000 pounds.

== Allusions to history, natural science, real places and persons ==
Crew members recruited from Shelmerston, the fictitious port on the west coast of England, report a large number of religious sects. One such is the group called Knipperdollings, a group who do not hold to the precepts of the first such group centuries earlier, but took the name to identify their beliefs apart from others. Martin gives Aubrey a full detailed history of the Knipperdolling beliefs then and on the ship.

Maturin mentions the Viennese treatment for the pox (venereal diseases), saying it relies on murias hydrargi corrosivus, which is a corrosive compound of mercury.

Dutourd asks Maturin if he knew Georges Cuvier, a well-known anatomist and natural philosopher in Paris.

In his botanizing walks up into the high Andes Mountain peaks, Maturin is delighted to see numerous condors, a puma, huge flowering bromeliads and to see and then learn the difference between guanacos and vicuñas. In the long trek out of Peru, llamas are used, a domesticated breed, which took some time to stop spitting at Maturin.

The Vicar General (a Catholic priest) with whom Father Sam Panda works has the last name O'Higgins, and is suggested to be a relative of Bernardo O'Higgins, who was fighting for Chilean independence from Spanish colonial rule since 1810.

Aubrey mentions the Spanish Disturbance in Nootka Sound (off Vancouver Island) in 1789 as being a year with good effects in his life. After the loss in the American Revolution, the Royal Navy left midshipman and officers "on the beach". The Nootka crisis took some years to be resolved, on the question of which European power has rights to North and South American lands, if there is no settlement from that European power on the land. The Royal Navy stepped up its ship making, and in 1792 allowed master's mate Aubrey to pass for Lieutenant and get a berth on ship, at the same time readying the Royal Navy for the long war against France.

The port town at Callao is real, as is Lima, up higher in the mountains from Callao; in current times, the two are part of one urbanized area. The Andes Mountains are noted for many high peaks and passes, with an average height throughout the long range of 4,000 m (13,000 ft). Maturin and Eduardo viewed Lake Titicaca and its wildlife. Such high altitudes can strain breathing; the coca leaves that Maturin liked to chew, something he learned on his first visit to Peru, make it easier to stand the altitude. Maturin and Eduardo drank mate as they walked, which is a tea made from the coca leaf. Maturin came down from the mountains at Arica, a port now in Chile but then considered part of Peru. He made his way to the appointed meeting place at Valparaíso, a major port city in Chile.

== Publication history ==
As listed

- 1993 HarperCollins hardback ISBN 0-00-223826-8 / 978-0-00-223826-7 (UK edition)
- 1993, November W. W. Norton hardback ISBN 0-393-03558-1 / 978-0-393-03558-2 (USA edition)
- 1994, April Thorndike Press paperback ISBN 0-7862-0133-9 / 978-0-7862-0133-4 (USA edition)
- 1994, October W. W. Norton paperback ISBN 0-393-31244-5 / 978-0-393-31244-7 (USA edition)
- 1994 Recorded Books audio cassette edition ISBN 0-7366-2657-3 / 978-0-7366-2657-6 (USA edition)
- 1995, March Chivers Large print ISBN 0-7451-3576-5 / 978-0-7451-3576-2 (UK edition)
- 1995, September Isis Audio cassette edition ISBN 1-85496-922-6 / 978-1-85496-922-4 (UK edition)
- 1997, July HarperCollins paperback ISBN 0-00-649931-7 / 978-0-00-649931-2 (UK edition)
- 2000, March HarperCollins audio cassette edition ISBN 0-00-105579-8 / 978-0-00-105579-7 (UK edition)
- 2001, January Books on Tape audio CD edition ISBN 0-7366-6166-2 / 978-0-7366-6166-9 (USA edition)
- 2002, January Random House Audio cassette edition ISBN 0-375-41602-1 / 978-0-375-41602-6 (USA edition)
- 2006, November Blackstone Audiobooks Audio CD edition ISBN 0-7861-5978-2 / 978-0-7861-5978-9 (USA edition)
- 2008 Playaway audio edition ISBN 1-60775-420-7 / 978-1-60775-420-6 (USA edition)
- 2008, June Harper Perennial paperback edition ISBN 0-00-727559-5 / 978-0-00-727559-5 (UK edition)
- 2011, December W. W. Norton E-Book edition ISBN 9780393063691 (USA edition)
- 2011, December Harper E-book edition (Canada & UK edition)
- 2013, October Audible Studios audio edition (UK edition)

It is in this book that the drawing of a sailing ship of this era is added to the print copies. "Far more confusing to newcomers may be some of the nautical and scientific dialogue the characters exchange. O'Brian's publishers have equipped the book with a drawing of the Surprise, numbering 21 sails, from the flying jib to the mizzen topgallant staysail. But that hardly prepares the unwary for Captain Aubrey and his crew's discussions of recondite items like cross-catharpins, dumb-chalders, side-trees, heel-pieces, side-fishes, cheeks, front-fish and cant-pieces."

The popularity of the series has expanded beyond a small group of devoted fans, as the author is invited to visit the US, where many distinguished readers of his newly discovered series wait to meet him. Paul D. Colford notes that when he "visited the United States a few weeks ago, fans waiting to meet, lunch and have tea with him included Walter Cronkite, Sen. Dirk Kempthorne (R-Idaho) and Supreme Court Justice Anthony Kennedy, who invited O'Brian to attend a session of the high court. Hollywood also wants a piece of the press-shy storyteller." The activities of US publisher W. W. Norton & Company are mentioned as part of the increase in popularity: "Norton also plans to keep stoking interest in O'Brian by reissuing all his books in hardcover starting in the spring and by bringing out two additional titles in April." This process of discovery by W. W. Norton was begun in 1990, and mentioned in the article on The Nutmeg of Consolation.
