= Clarissa Oakes =

1992 novel by Patrick O'Brian

- First edition
- Author: Patrick O'Brian
- Cover artist: Geoff Hunt
- Language: English
- Series: Aubrey-Maturin series
- Genre: Historical novel
- Publisher: HarperCollins (UK)
- Publication date: 1992
- Publication place: United Kingdom
- Media type: Print Hardback & Paperback, Audio Book (Compact audio cassette & CD)
- Pages: 256 paperback edition
- ISBN: 0-393-03109-8 first edition, hardback
- OCLC: 25051419
- Dewey Decimal: 823/.914 20
- LC Class: PR6029.B55 C57 1992
- Preceded by: The Nutmeg of Consolation
- Followed by: The Wine-Dark Sea

Clarissa Oakes (titled The Truelove in the United States) is the fifteenth historical novel in the Aubrey-Maturin series by British author Patrick O'Brian, first published in 1992. The story is set during the Napoleonic Wars and the War of 1812.

This novel constitutes the third of a five-novel circumnavigation of the globe; other novels in this voyage include The Thirteen Gun Salute, The Nutmeg of Consolation, The Wine-Dark Sea, and The Commodore.

Glad that the penal colony is behind him, Captain Aubrey discovers a stowaway prisoner aboard near Norfolk Island. He deals with her before he allows the cutter from the governor at New South Wales to deliver his new orders to handle a political situation on a Pacific island. En route, Maturin learns the key to finding the high level agent giving British information to the French, while Aubrey addresses the unhappy crew of Surprise.

One reviewer finds this novel a pure joy to read as it shares unmistakably original insights into the mysteries of the world. "His books add up to a portrait of an entire world, containing every single aspect of human life." Specifically, the title character Clarissa Oakes "gives O'Brian a chance to explore their [Aubrey and Maturin's] characters in exceptional depth." One reviewer compared O'Brian's writing style to that of several famous writers, considering that he has left C S Forester far behind, and is "one of the best storytellers afloat," with use of nautical detail that is "unalloyed, unapologetic and absolutely right." Another called it "intelligent escape" as reading material, while another found that it "will delight fans."

== Plot summary ==
Surprise sails eastbound from Port Jackson in New South Wales. Jack Aubrey is in an ill-humour as a result of the frigate's visit to the abysmal penal settlement – firstly, because Stephen Maturin's duel with an army officer antagonized the local administration until the governor returned, and secondly because Padeen Colman, Maturin's servant and an absconder, was rescued against Aubrey's wishes. Aubrey observes ribaldry amongst his crew and remains puzzled until he and Pullings find a young female convict, Clarissa Harvill, during the ship's inspection. She was smuggled aboard in Sydney Cove by Midshipman Oakes. Aubrey is at first determined to leave them both on Norfolk Island, but lets them stay aboard until they reach a safer port.

Surprise spots a cutter, Eclair. Aubrey suspects the cutter seeks the runaways. He agrees that Harvill and Oakes may marry on board. Aubrey gives some fine red silk he bought for Sophie to be used for a wedding dress for Clarissa, who wears midshipman's clothes. Martin conducts the ceremony, while Bonden hides Padeen. The cutter bears dispatches for Aubrey and mail for the ship, and a captain whose father was surgeon on Surprise, eager to see her. The mail brings many letters from Sophia and from Diana. Aubrey sees Maturin's happiness that his daughter was born, while Sophia writes him that the infant has development troubles, a secret to keep from Maturin. The governor orders Aubrey to settle a local dispute on Moahu, a nominally British island to the south of the Sandwich Islands. The gun room feasts the newlyweds. Despite the delicious swordfish speared by Davies (after it pierced the ship), good conversation is impaired by the level of animosity existing amongst the gun room members, most visibly West and Davidge. The cause is jealousy over Clarissa, who has had sexual liaisons with several of the ship's officers. This ill-will spreads to the crew, who divide in pro-and anti-Clarissa factions. In the blue water sailing, Maturin befriends Clarissa Oakes.

The ship spots a British whaler at the island of Annamooka in Tonga. Wainright, captain of Daisy, tells Aubrey about the situation on Moahu. There is a war between Kalahua in the north and Puolani in the south, with the northern chief being supported by the armed privateer Franklin, sailing under the American flag, owned by Jean Dutourd of Louisiana, and Britain is at war with America. The privateer has captured Truelove, a British whaler. While the crew provisions Surprise, Clarissa, who has received a black eye from Oakes, confesses to Maturin on their botanizing walk together about her being sexually abused as a young girl and later working as a bookkeeper and occasional prostitute at a brothel in Piccadilly. These experiences formed her sexual outlook, indifference to something that gives no pleasure. Maturin explains the jealousy of men to her. When she mentions that she saw an aristocratic acquaintance of the late turncoats Ledward and Wray at the brothel, Maturin realises that he is the highly placed traitor long sought by Sir Joseph Blaine and Maturin. He sends a coded letter to Blaine via Wainwright.

Aubrey drives his frigate's crew hard on the trip to Moahu due to their poor showing at Annamooka. On reaching Moahu, they meet Truelove, now their prize, and a column is sent to intercept the fleeing French. The skirmish is won but Davidge and others are killed, with no survivors among the French. Surprise then sails to the south of the island to defend Queen Puolani against the main body of French and Kalahua's tribesmen, as she agrees to accept the protection of King George III. Aubrey sets up carronades in a cleft and there is a terrific slaughter of the enemy the following day. That night, after a great feast, Aubrey welcomes the queen to his bed. Truelove departs, commanded by Oakes, with Clarissa on board bearing a copy of the letter to Blaine with her. Aubrey gives funds to Oakes, while Maturin gives funds to Clarissa, separately, for their passage to England. Franklin appears but sails away immediately, with Surprise giving chase.

== Characters ==
- Jack Aubrey: Captain of HM Hired Vessel Surprise and on the Navy List.
- Stephen Maturin: Ship's Surgeon, natural philosopher, particular friend of Jack and an intelligence officer.
- Sophia Aubrey: Wife of Jack and mother of their three children.
- Diana Villiers: Cousin to Sophia, wife of Stephen and mother of their daughter.
- Brigid Maturin: Infant daughter of Maturin and his wife, Diana Villiers.

Aboard HM Hired Vessel Surprise

- Mr William Reade: Midshipman on Surprise who lost an arm in battle; introduced in The Thirteen Gun Salute. His voice is starting to break now.
- William Oakes: Midshipman on Surprise who was taken on in Batavia as able seaman, then promoted to midshipman in The Nutmeg of Consolation. His mate was killed in action. He is promoted to master's mate during this voyage. On parting, Aubrey gives him an acting lieutenant's commission.
- Clarissa Oakes née Harvill: Fugitive prisoner from Botany Bay and stowaway on Surprise until discovered by the captain, then she marries William Oakes aboard ship. She is educated and of good family, a gentlewoman.
- The unknown duke: The unknown deduced in The Thirteen Gun Salute takes form as a duke with the Order of the Garter, who walks with a limp, and would never talk with Ledward publicly when Ledward was alive, per description that emerges from conversation between Clarissa Oakes and Maturin. He is the high-ranking government official who leaks information to the French.
- Captain Tom Pullings: Commander in the Royal Navy and first mate on HM Hired Vessel Surprise.
- Mr Nathaniel Martin: Surgeon's Assistant on Surprise, parson, and natural philosopher. Aubrey offers him livings (position as parson) as he now has several belonging to him by inheritance. He was introduced in The Ionian Mission.
- Padeen Colman: Irish-speaking servant to Maturin, and loblolly boy aboard ship.
- Barret Bonden: Captain's Coxswain on Surprise.
- Preserved Killick: Captain's Steward on Surprise.
- Mr Bulkeley: Bosun on Surprise.
- Awkward Davies: Able Seaman on Surprise.
- Sarah and Emily Sweeting: Melanesian orphans saved from Sweetings Island in The Nutmeg of Consolation; rated ship's boys on Surprise.
- Mr Davidge: Third Mate on HM Hired Vessel Surprise. He attended Trinity College in Dublin like Maturin, and knew the same amount of duelling in those years. He had been a Royal Navy lieutenant and would like to be one again, introduced in The Letter of Marque. He is killed leading the successful first attack against the French on Moahu.
- Mr West: Second Mate on HM Hired Vessel Surprise. He had been a Royal Navy lieutenant, and would like to be one again. He was introduced in The Letter of Marque.
- Mr M'Mullen: Commands the cutter Eclair out of Sydney, and whose father was surgeon on Surprise in 1799 at the recapture of Hermione.
- Weightman: Butcher on Surprise, who cannot accept that the island pigs want taro in their feed.
- Jemmy Ducks: Poultry Keeper on Surprise with responsibility for the little girls, too.
- Mr Adams: Captain's Clerk on Surprise.
- Edward Norton: Recently deceased owner of neighboring lands to Aubrey's boyhood home of Woolcombe, and a friend to his grandfather. In childhood, Aubrey called him cousin Edward. Norton owned all the land for the borough of Milport with its 17 electors and leaves it to Jack Aubrey. Introduced in The Letter of Marque.
- Mr Withers: Attorney from Dorchester who handled all of Aubrey's legal work, also deceased, whose young partner sends all the paperwork to Aubrey at sea, instead of handling it. Aubrey works at it, and asks Adams help, as well.

At Annamooka island

- Pakeea: Annamooka Chieftain.
- Tereo: Annamooka Senior Chieftain who welcomes Aubrey and his ship, allows them to get water and fresh food.
- Mr Wainright: Captain of Daisy.
- Dr Falconer: Surgeon on Daisy, and a naturalist.

At Moahu island

- William Hoskins: On Truelove, once armourer's mate on HMS Polychrest (see Post Captain), tells Aubrey how many French are on Truelove as Surprise seizes several French prisoners who were fooled by the ship's disguise. Hoskins is not fooled.
- Puolani: Queen of the Polynesian island of Moahu.
- Kalahua: Leader on the north of the island of Moahu, allies with Dutourd to fight the Queen's forces, so he can rule. He loses, is killed and eaten by the winners.
- Jean Dutourd: Franklin's owner and an idealist, seeking an island to set up his notion of a utopian community, but likely to attack any in the way of his ideals. He is from Louisiana, now a part of the US, an enemy to the UK. His followers and crew are mainly French, from Louisiana or Canada. They have chosen Moahu.
- The Sailing Master: As Dutourd is no seaman, he hires an American to sail Franklin, which operates under American colors. The sailing master is not yet seen, but Truelove crew and the islanders know of him.

== Ships ==
- British
  - HM Hired Vessel Surprise
  - HMS Eclair – 14-gun cutter
- British South Seas whalers and Nootka Island fur-traders
  - Truelove
  - Daisy
  - Heartsease
- American
  - Franklin – 22-gun privateer, with a crew of French speakers from Louisiana

== Title in the US ==
Clarissa Oakes was published in the U.S. as The Truelove, which is the name of a ship in the novel.

== Series chronology ==
This novel references actual historical events with accurate historical detail, like all in this series. In respect to the internal chronology of the series, it is the ninth of eleven novels (beginning with The Surgeon's Mate) that might take five or six years to happen but are all pegged to an extended 1812, or as Patrick O'Brian says it, 1812a and 1812b (introduction to The Far Side of the World, the tenth novel in this series). The events of The Yellow Admiral again match up with the historical years of the Napoleonic wars in sequence, as the first six novels did.

== Reviews ==
Dick Adler writing in the Chicago Tribune has high praise for this novel, finding it "a pure joy to read-on its own or as part of the glorious whole. It was published in England as Clarissa Oakes, which probably sounded too Jane Austen-ish to American editorial ears. But it's a perfect title, because the slim and lively girl who stows away on the HMS Surprise as it sails from Botany Bay is the real heart of O`Brian's moving and erotic story." Adler feels that Clarissa Oakes' presence "gives O`Brian a chance to explore their [Aubrey and Maturin's] characters in exceptional depth." The story has "plenty of action, including a remarkable battle with cannibals in which O`Brian sums up all the horror in one unforgettable image."

Adler concludes that "what lifts The Truelove into the highest ranks of fiction is what it shares with the rest of its author's writing: page after page of unmistakably original insights into the mysteries of the world.

Anthony Bailey, writing in The New York Times, finds that this novel puts the reader "on board the Surprise in the South Pacific in the early 19th century amid a swirl of nautical detail, unalloyed, unapologetic and absolutely right." in a novel written by "one of the best storytellers afloat". He suggests that with his first novel in this series, O'Brian may have been competing with C. S. Forester, but "At this point, he is in a different squadron altogether, providing pleasure for those who will never be able to read a new Captain Marryat (the author, in the 1830s and 1840s, of a number of sea adventures) – but in this instance a Marryat with a touch of Jane Austen, Erskine Childers and John le Carré thrown in." The relationship between the principal characters is "One of the delights of these books", where "Aubrey is a sailor in his blood and bones" and Maturin "remains a landlubber the non-seafaring reader can identify with." Bailey notes the use of letters home, a device used also by William Golding in his sea-faring trilogy To the Ends of the Earth, and finds that "O'Brian while telling his yarn writes like a man simply at home in a 500-ton frigate. All the naval minutiae of the early 19th century are evidently in his grasp, but like the Surprise's maintopsails, they are used to drive the book forward, a great show that also has cumulative effect." Bailey highlights many aspects of the plot, which issues are addressed by Aubrey, and which are handled by Maturin, and notes that in this novel, the officers have a particularly varied diet, including "a suicidal swordfish, soused pig's face and a Polynesian stew in which a human ear floats."

Kirkus Reviews finds this novel to be "Intelligent escape. Not for the rushed."

Publishers Weekly feels this novel "will delight fans, while offering newcomers a good place to jump in."

== Allusion to real places ==
The plot takes the ship to a fictional island south of the Hawaiian Islands, which were first known as the Sandwich Islands.

== Publication history ==
- Recorded Books LLC Audio edition narrated by Patrick Tull ISBN 1419302728
- W. W. Norton & Company E-book edition 2011 ISBN 9780393063684
