= The Thirteen-Gun Salute =

1989 novel by Patrick O'Brian

- First edition
- Author: Patrick O'Brian
- Cover artist: Geoff Hunt
- Language: English
- Series: Aubrey–Maturin series
- Genre: Historical novel
- Published: 1989 Collins (UK)
- Publication place: United Kingdom
- Media type: Print (Hardback & Paperback) & Audio Book (Compact audio cassette, Compact Disc)
- Pages: 319
- ISBN: 0-00-223460-2 first Collins edition, hardback
- OCLC: 23692637
- Dewey Decimal: 823/.914 20
- LC Class: PR6029.B56 T45 1991
- Preceded by: The Letter of Marque
- Followed by: The Nutmeg of Consolation

The Thirteen-Gun Salute is the thirteenth historical novel in the Aubrey–Maturin series by Patrick O'Brian, first published in 1989. The story is set during the Napoleonic Wars and the War of 1812.

This novel constitutes the first of a five-novel circumnavigation of the globe; other novels in this voyage include The Nutmeg of Consolation, Clarissa Oakes/The Truelove, The Wine-Dark Sea, and The Commodore.

Spain hears that England may be supporting the independence of its colonies in South America, while an envoy is needed in the Malay states to gain an ally for England. These two changes alter Aubrey's mission from his private man-of-war, Surprise en route to South America. They learn this at Lisbon, where Surprise parts company under Tom Pullings. Aubrey is reinstated on the Navy List in London and gains command of HMS Diane, carrying the envoy to negotiate a treaty with Pulo Prabang aided by Maturin, who discovers there a naturalist's paradise. Then the Diane is en route to a rendezvous with Surprise, when shoals and a typhoon challenge the Diane and her crew.

== Plot summary ==
On land after ceasing his habitual use of laudanum, Stephen Maturin finds he has changed; his naturally "ardent" temperament returns and alters his relationship with his wife Diana, who is now pregnant with their child. Maturin looks forward to the arrival of the child he is certain is a daughter. As the high level traitor in British intelligence is not yet identified, the time on land raises risks to the potential reinstatement to the Navy List of Maturin's friend, Jack Aubrey, who was disgraced and discharged on spurious grounds, and who now agrees to sail immediately. Aubrey, Maturin, and their shipmates prepare for a mission to sail the letter of marque Surprise on a mission to South America. Upon reaching Lisbon, Sir Joseph Blaine intercepts Maturin with news that he and Aubrey are required to carry a diplomat to the Sultan of Pulo Prabang, a fictional Malay pirate state in the South China Sea. Edward Fox is the envoy leading the mission to persuade the Sultan to become an English rather than French ally. The French mission includes the same English traitors - Ledward and Wray - who were responsible for Aubrey's former disgrace. With the Surprise under the command of Captain Pullings, Aubrey and Maturin return with Blaine to England, where Lord Melville, First Lord of the Admiralty, reinstates Aubrey as a Post-Captain in the Royal Navy and gives him command of the recently captured French ship Diane. The voyage south forms the crew, with frequent training on the guns; by the luck of a timely breeze and much hard rowing in the ship's boats, Diane escapes the inshore currents of Inaccessible Island. Sailing through the high forties (south latitude), she first touches land at Java, meeting Lieutenant Governor Raffles near Batavia, taking on additional members of Fox's mission, and where they hear the first word of bank failures in England.

Arriving in Pulo Prabang, Maturin meets fellow natural philosopher van Buren and helps the arrogant envoy Fox plot against the French mission. During the leisurely negotiations with the Sultan, Maturin climbs the "Thousand Steps" to fictional Kumai, a protected valley in the crater of a volcano and home to an hospitable Buddhist Monastery and the orangutans he has been longing to see. Returning to town, he learns that Abdul, the Sultan's cupbearer and catamite has been caught in a compromising position with both Ledward and Wray. Abdul is executed and Ledward and Wray's official protection is withdrawn and they are banished from the court for their indiscretions, effectively ending the French mission. Wray and Ledward are eventually assassinated and Maturin and van Buren dissect their bodies.

After a feast to celebrate the treaty, at which Fox and his retinue behave without discretion, the Diane makes for Batavia and to rendezvous with the Surprise. Fox behaves with increasing arrogance during the return voyage, the success of the treaty having gone to his head. After missing their rendezvous with the Surprise, the Diane sails toward Batavia, so Fox can sail to England with news of the treaty on another ship. The frigate runs aground on a hidden reef and cannot be floated again. They set up camp on a small island, but Fox insists on sailing in Diane's pinnace, rather than waiting until the ship is again afloat. He leaves Edwards aboard with an official duplicate of the treaty. A typhoon destroys the marooned Diane and Aubrey believes that the pinnace, if caught in the same storm, likely did not survive. The typhoon also batters the Diane's camp and destroys many of their supplies. With the situation growing desperate, Aubrey directs the men to build a vessel to get them to Batavia.

== Title ==
The title refers to the honour, a thirteen-gun salute from the ship's guns, that is due to Fox as an official envoy and representative of the King.

== Cover art ==
The cover art depicts HMS Diane and one of her boats working to escape the tides and the towering cliff of Inaccessible Island in the South Atlantic Ocean.

== Characters ==
See also Recurring characters in the Aubrey–Maturin series

In England

- Jack Aubrey: Captain of the letter of marque Surprise; MP; he is restored to the Navy List and appointed captain of HMS Diane because he is needed for the mission.
- Stephen Maturin: Ship's surgeon, natural philosopher, friend to Jack and an intelligence officer. Aboard HMS Diane, he sails as the Captain's guest, then acts as surgeon, allowing him to mess with the gunroom.
- Sophia Aubrey: Jack's wife and mother of their three children. She was introduced in Post Captain.
- Mrs Williams: Mother to Sophia and aunt to Diana; poverty and old age are softening her spleen. She was introduced in Post Captain.
- Diana Villiers: First cousin to Sophia, and Stephen's wife who is now with child. She was introduced in Post Captain.
- Tom Smith: Banker to whom Aubrey is shifting some of his funds, and brother to Henry, captain of HMS Revenge and Edward, captain of HMS Tremendous.
- The unknown: The man in a high government position who aided Ledward and Wray, who is not yet identified by Sir Joseph Blaine; his existence is clear by his exercise of power by gossip against Aubrey ashore while Surprise is fitting out, and informing Spain of Surprise's mission.
- Padeen Colman: Irishman, once servant to Maturin, who ran from Surprise while Maturin was injured (The Letter of Marque) to steal laudanum, to which he was addicted. Aubrey intervenes as an MP to alter the sentence of death to that of transportation to Botany Bay. Introduced in The Far Side of the World.
- Sam Panda: Natural son of Aubrey; Maturin speaks with the Patriarch of Lisbon in his favour and he writes from Brazil that he is ordained. He was introduced in The Reverse of the Medal.
- Lord Melville: First Lord of the Admiralty.
- Sir Joseph Blaine: Head of Intelligence at the Admiralty, entomologist and good friend to Maturin. He was introduced in Post Captain.

Aboard Surprise

- Captain Tom Pullings: a volunteer and First Lieutenant on the Surprise, who later takes over as captain for the South American mission. He was introduced in Master and Commander.
- Barret Bonden: Coxswain to Aubrey since his first command, who follows Aubrey to HMS Diane. He was introduced in Master and Commander.
- Preserved Killick: Steward cum butler to Aubrey, also aids Maturin, who follows Aubrey to HMS Diane. He was introduced in Master and Commander.
- Mr Nathaniel Martin: Unbeneficed clergyman and natural philosopher; surgeon's mate to Maturin aboard Surprise. Introduced in The Ionian Mission.
- Mr Standish: Purser new to the sea and new to the Surprise, violin player and a friend of Martin from Oxford university days. Seasickness overwhelms him, so he leaves the ship in Santiago to become Colonel Lumley's secretary.
- Orkney men: Group of seamen picked up sailing back from the Baltic Sea aboard Surprise, who do not yet meld with the rest of the ship's crew. They have a unique cadence to their singing.
- Awkward Davies: able seaman aboard Surprise; a brute of a man whom Aubrey saved from drowning often.
- Robert Gough: Member of the United Irishmen, known to Maturin but differing in some key views. Maturin sees him aboard a snow which the Surprise chases in the Irish Sea. The snow is abandoned, to Maturin's relief, as Gough would be hanged if taken.

Aboard HMS Diane

- Edward Fox: Foreign Office envoy to Pulo Prabang, carried on HMS Diane, always insistent on his privileges.
- Mr David Edwards: Fox's secretary, a man of pleasant personality.
- Loder: Member of Fox's retinue, joining the ship at Batavia.
- Johnstone: A Judge and a member of Fox's retinue, joining the ship at Batavia.
- Mr James Fielding: First Lieutenant aboard HMS Diane, who has long sea experience but none in battle.
- Mr Bampfylde Elliott: Second Lieutenant aboard HMS Diane. This voyage is his first sea service as an officer. Aubrey judges him "no seaman" but likes the young man. He volunteers to captain the pinnace when Fox insists on sailing to Java with the treaty.
- Dick Richardson: Third Lieutenant in the Diane, selected by Aubrey (called Spotted Dick as midshipman when introduced in The Mauritius Command aboard HMS Boadicea).
- Graham: Surgeon aboard HMS Diane, who is left behind when ship is windbound in Plymouth, not responding to the blue peter.
- Macmillan: Surgeon's mate, who took Graham's place despite his three months at sea, taking advice from Maturin.
- William Reade: Midshipman on HMS Diane, one of the two youngest in midshipman's berth.
- Fleming: Midshipman and son of an eminent natural philosopher and member of the Royal Society.
- Clerke: Midshipman.
- Greene: Midshipman.
- Harper: Midshipman on HMS Diane, other of the two youngest in midshipman's berth.
- Seymour: Masters mate, planning to take examination for lieutenant, one of two eldest in midshipman's berth.
- Bennett: Masters mate, also readying for the examination, other of the eldest pair in midshipman's berth.
- Elijah Butcher: Captain's clerk, who aids Aubrey in his regular records for Humboldt of the temperature and salinity of the sea on this voyage.
- Welby: Lieutenant of the Marines on HMS Diane.
- Hadley: Carpenter on HMS Diane.
- Ahmed: Malay servant to Maturin who aids him in learning the language during the voyage.

In Pulo Prabang or Java

- Stamford Raffles: Governor of Java, residing at Buitenzorg, and a close friend of Fox's.
- Duplessis: The French envoy in Pulo Prabang.
- Edward Ledward, once of the Treasury and Andrew Wray, once of the Admiralty: Two English traitors and both active enemies to Aubrey and Maturin; part of the French delegation. Both characters were introduced in Desolation Island.
- Sultan of Pulo Prabang: Ruler sought as an ally by Fox, for Britain, and Duplessis, for France.
- Sultana Hafsa: Wife of the Sultan, who is with child, and is of a powerful and jealous family.
- Abdul: Attractive boy who is a lover to the Sultan, and also to Ledward and Wray, his downfall.
- Cornelius van Buren: Well known Dutch biologist and anatomist with a special interest in the spleen, who lives at Pulo Batang, despite the Dutch having lost the lands. He married here, and keeps up a lively correspondence with natural philosophers in Europe, including Georges Cuvier, and is a good colleague to Maturin.
- Lesueur: Clerk for the French who becomes a contact for Maturin, until the French uncover the dual role and kill Lesueur.
- Ananda: Buddhist monk at Kumai crater who offered food to Maturin, and had hand raised the orangutan named Muong.
- Pierrot Dumesnil: Lieutenant of the French ship Cornélie; nephew of Christy-Pallière, both first met by Aubrey in Master and Commander.

== Ships ==
- British
  - Surprise - a private man-of-war or letter of marque
  - HMS Diane - 32-gun French-built frigate bought into British service after capture
  - HMS Briseis - passed in port at Lisbon
  - HMS Nimble - a two-hundred ton cutter
- French
  - Cornélie - frigate
  - A snow (bearing Robert Gough, a United Irishman and former acquaintance of Maturin)

== Series chronology ==
This novel references actual events with accurate historical detail, like all in this series. In respect to the internal chronology of the series, it is the seventh of eleven novels (beginning with The Surgeon's Mate) that might take five or six years to happen but are all pegged to an extended 1812, or as Patrick O'Brian says it, 1812a and 1812b (introduction to The Far Side of the World, the tenth novel in this series). The events of The Yellow Admiral again match up with the historical years of the Napoleonic wars in sequence, as the first six novels did.

== Continuity ==
This story starts a few months after The Letter of Marque ends, with the Surprise ready for the South American voyage imagined at the time of her letter of marque. The crew aboard Surprise is unchanged, save for those men who use their prize money from the first cruise of the Surprise to set up inns or pubs, collectively called Aubrey's Arms. All but one of the high level spies appear in this novel, specifically Ledward and Wray, who had fled to France in The Letter of Marque and are now arrived in Pulo Prabang as part of Duplessis's mission, as Ledward can translate for Duplessis. After seeing Gough in the French privateer, Maturin reflects on his life since the rising in 1798, rereading old diaries that tell when he began his work with intelligence to the purposes of defeating Napoleon, supporting Irish independence and freeing Catalonia, after meeting Aubrey.

== Reviews ==
The uneven pace of re-issues in the US is noted by Kirkus Reviews, who listed this thirteenth novel in the Aubrey-Maturin series after their own reviews of two books much earlier in the series (HMS Surprise and The Mauritius Command, third and fourth in the series respectively). Dr Stephen Maturin is described as "an intellectual counterpoint to Jack's more physical presence." After a nod to the story, they conclude that "the ultimate appeal of the Aubrey/Maturin adventures lies in O'Brian's delicious old-fashioned prose, the wonderfully complex sentences that capture the feel of the sea and the culture of the great warships, all the while sketching with apparent accuracy and truth the early 19th-century world."

Publishers Weekly notes that Aubrey is once again a captain in the Royal Navy and "even a rotten-borough M.P." Maturin's stay in the valley "where he blissfully encounters and studies a variety of tame exotic beasts" is called "charming". They mention that the author's writing style has been compared to that of Jane Austen, and praise the wit of guests at "the dinners (in country house, London, ship's mess, sultan's palace, Buddhist monastery)".

Thomas Flanagan, writing in the New York Times Books was pleased to have discovered the series of novels by virtue of an essay by Richard Snow, "who roundly and with polemical extravagance declared them to be "the best historical novels ever written." Not quite, perhaps." adding that delayed appreciation of the series of novels "is not exclusively American. The British critic Peter Wishart has described the neglect of Patrick O'Brian as a literary wonder of the age, "as baffling as the Inca inability to invent the wheel." Why all the fuss?" The writing style, structure, and plot are remarked favourably, including many incidents of The Thirteen Gun Salute: "The novels display a dazzling receptiveness to language, an understanding of period speech so entire that it never needs to preen itself -- although here and there it does. There is a recklessness with plot that is intentionally subversive of the genre. Climactic scenes are deliberately thrown away, revealed in casual conversation. The narrative pauses to digress on orangutans in Borneo, the cuisine of Portugal, a Mozart quartet. The twists of plot are swift, drastic, on occasion comic, on occasion grotesque: in this novel, Maturin's way of dealing with two English traitors at the Malay court of Pulo Prabang draws casually and lethally on his knowledge of zoology and his skill as an anatomist." Flanagan concludes that "It is a pleasure to read a contemporary historical novel written not by machine but by hand.

Regarding the re-issue of the entire series after publisher W W Norton became interested for the US market, Richard Snow wrote in 1991 that he had read the novels from Master and Commander to Desolation Island from American publishers twenty years earlier. O'Brian's "portrayal of life aboard a sailing ship is vivid and authoritative" and O'Brian presented "the lost arcana of that hard-pressed, cruel, courageous world with an immediacy that makes its workings both comprehensible and fascinating." He noted too that "behind the humor, behind the storms and the broadside duels . . . loomed something larger: the shape and texture of a whole era." As strong as the historical detail was, Snow remarked that "in the end it is the serious exploration of human character that gives the books their greatest power", and he also referred to the poetry of the writing, saying that O'Brian "manages to express, with the grace and economy of poetry, familiar things that somehow never get written down, as when he carefully details the rueful steps by which Stephen Maturin falls out of love." At this time of the re-issues of the novels by W W Norton in the US, Snow recommended that a reader start with the first and keep reading to the last one, then "You will have read what I continue to believe are the best historical novels ever written."

Writing about this novel, comments include that "the ultimate appeal of the Aubrey/Maturin adventures lies in O'Brian's delicious old-fashioned prose" that is "sketching with apparent accuracy and truth the early 19th-century world."Another reviewer finds "There is a recklessness with plot that is intentionally subversive of the genre", while showing "a dazzling receptiveness to language, an understanding of period speech so entire". O'Brian's style has been compared to that of Jane Austen. As to this novel's plot, "the most charming segment is Maturin's idyllic stay in a remote valley, where he blissfully encounters and studies a variety of tame exotic beasts." and "twists of plot are swift, drastic, on occasion comic," and sometimes grotesque.

== Allusions to science and history ==
On the voyage to Java, Jack has with him a chart showing Alexander von Humboldt's maximum and minimum sea-temperatures over a vast stretch of ocean. He sets out to carry on Humboldt's programme of measuring temperatures at various depths, salinity, atmospheric pressure etc. - as he says to Stephen, to have 'A chain right round to the Pacific'.

For instruments, he takes on board the Surprise:

- an improved dipping-needle
- a very delicate hygrometer of Jack's own invention
- an improved azimuth compass
- a Geneva cyanograph
- thermometers graduated by Ramsden

Captain Aubrey's orders to HMS Diane are mentioned as occurring in the "fifty-third year" of the reign of King George III, thus fixing the year about 1813. The years of his reign began in October, and the story mentions the months of May, June and being in the austral winter after crossing the equator when sailing around Africa on HMS Diane; the author, as promised in the preface to the first book in the series, takes liberties with times of events. May of the 53rd year of the reign of George III might well be May 1814. O'Brian refers to these novels with no precise connection to actual years as 1812a, 1812b (see section above on series chronology). Due to the mental illness of the king, the 53rd year of George III's reign was also the third or fourth year of the Regency, which began in February 1811.

The wreck of HMS Diane on an uncharted reef and the subsequent events may be based actual events surrounding the loss of HMS Alceste. Under command of Captain Murray Maxwell, the ship wrecked on an uncharted reef in the Gaspar Straight in 1817. The crew abandoned the ship and made camp on a nearby island. Murray sent Ambassador Amherst on to Batavia in one of the ship's boats. While awaiting rescue, the crew repulsed an attack by a large group of what sources refer to as "Malay pirates" or "savages".

== Allusions to other literature ==
Lois Montbertrand published an article concerning O'Brian's anachronistic use of A. E. Housman's poem "Bells in the Tower" in this novel. She explains how O'Brian uses the fragment of the poem in the plot, as one character wants to get closer to Stephen Maturin, while Stephen Maturin would rather not.

== Publication history ==
- 1989 Collins hardback first UK edition ISBN 0-00-223460-2
- 1991 Collins paperback UK edition ISBN 0-00-617885-5
- 1991, June W W Norton hardback USA edition ISBN 0-393-02974-3
- 1992, August W W Norton paperback USA edition ISBN 0-393-30907-X
- 1995 Recorded Books, LLC Audio cassette USA edition narrated by Patrick Tull ISBN 1-4193-1987-6
- 1998, November HarperCollins hardback UK edition ISBN 0-00-223460-2
- 2002, January Thorndike Press hardback USA edition ISBN 0-7862-1937-8
- 2003 Chivers Large print hardback UK edition ISBN 0-7540-1821-0
- 2004, March Chivers Large Print paperback UK edition ISBN 0-7540-9200-3
- 2008, May Blackstone Audio Audio Cassette USA edition narrated by Simon Vance ISBN 0-7861-4592-7
- 2011 W W Norton & Company, e-book edition, 2011, ISBN 9780393063660

The process of reissuing the novels prior to this novel was in full swing in 1991, as the whole series gained a new and wider audience, as Mark Howowitz describes at the time of publication of the fourteenth novel in the series, following The Thirteen Gun Salute. The US reviews were all written in 1991, based on the W. W. Norton re-issue, rather than the prior Collins 1989 first publication of this novel. Master and Commander was published in the US in 1969; Horowitz refers to the first UK edition of that novel.

Two of my favorite friends are fictitious characters; they live in more than a dozen volumes always near at hand. Their names are Jack Aubrey and Stephen Maturin, and their creator is a 77-year-old novelist named Patrick O'Brian, whose 14 books about them have been continuously in print in England since the first, Master and Commander, was published in 1970. O'Brian's British fans include T. J. Binyon, Iris Murdoch, A. S. Byatt, Timothy Mo and Mary Renault, but, until recently, this splendid saga of two serving officers in the British Royal Navy during the Napoleonic Wars was unavailable in this country, apart from the first few instalments which went immediately out of print. Last year, however, W. W. Norton decided to reissue the series in its entirety.
