= Islands of Chile =

The islands of Chile encompass the various islands that the government of Chile has sovereignty over. By far the majority of these are the islands in the south of the country. Chile has one of the world's longest coastlines, and one of the most dangerous for boats; it is more than 4,000 kilometres (2,500 mi) long and has at least 43,471 islands.

Classifications vary for isla ("island"), islote ("islet"), roquerío ("rocks"), farallón ("cliff") and archipiélago or grupo ("archipelago"). The Hydrographic and Oceanographic Service of the Chilean Navy has begun to consider island a surface greater than 100,000 m^{2} (1,100,000 sq ft).

== Island territory ==
The Chilean Ministry of National Assets and the Chilean Military Geographical Institute has counted 43,471 units of land, according to last update at 2019, located between the 18° 15'S and 56° 32'S latitudes, with a total area of 105,561 square kilometres (40,757 sq mi), that is, 14% of Chile's territory (not including its Antarctica claims). The biggest eight islands and archipelagos (Tierra del Fuego, Chiloé, Wellington, Riesco, Hoste, Santa Inés, Navarino and Magdalena), each measuring over 2,000 km^{2} (770 sq mi) in area, represent 56% of the island territory of Chile. The 381 biggest islands – all those over 10 km^{2} (3 7/8 sq mi) in area – represent 97% of the island territory of Chile.

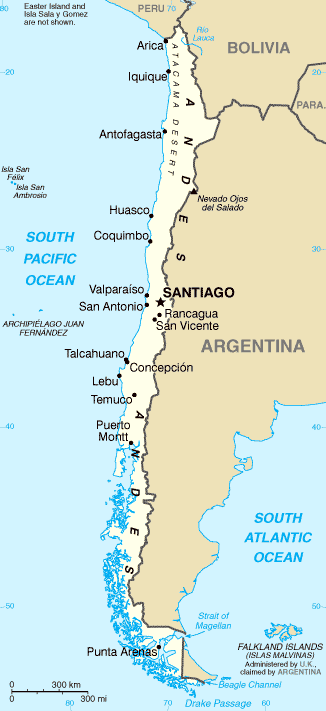
A map of Chile

Location of the Archipelagoes of Patagonia

== Units by region ==
Units by region, according to last update of 2019:

Regions of Chile	Number of islands
Tarapacá Region	111
Antofagasta Region	241
Atacama Region	319
Coquimbo Region	335
Valparaíso Region	269
O'Higgins Region	1
Maule Region	1
Ñuble Region	1
Biobío Region	397
Los Ríos Region	23
Los Lagos Region	1,769
Aysén Region	10,050
Magallanes Region	29,954
Total	43,471

== River and lake islands ==
- Guapi of Ranco Lake
- Isla del Rey
- Isla Teja
- Malvinas
- Orrego

== Phantom islands ==
Elizabeth Island, Bodesta, Pactolus Bank and some reefs have been mentioned in the past as lying near Chilean territories but they are phantom islands. Gable Island is listed by National Geospatial-Intelligence Agency, Country Files (GNS) as a Chilean Island, but it is actually part of Argentina.

== Literature islands ==
Several reports, novels and tales have the islands of Chile as geographic background:

- The Narrative of the Honourable John Byron by John Byron
- The Survivors of the "Jonathan" by Jules Verne
- El último grumete de la Baquedano by Francisco Coloane
- The Golden Ocean by Patrick O'Brian
- The Unknown Shore by Patrick O'Brian
- Robinson Crusoe of Daniel Defoe
- Two Years' Vacation by Jules Verne
- The Voyage of the Beagle by Charles Darwin
- Benito Cereno by Herman Melville
- The Ice Limit by Douglas Preston and Lincoln Child, on Desolacion Island
- Hawaii by James Michener, on Desolacion Island
- The German poet Adelbert von Chamisso wrote a poem about Sala y Gomez Island based on his reflections upon visiting the island in 1816.
- Ishmael, in Herman Melville's classic novel, Moby Dick, recalls a marble tablet at a whalemen's chapel in New Bedford which pays homage to a whaleman named John Talbot who lost his life whaling "near the Isle of Desolation, off Patagonia". This recollection occurs in Chapter 7, "The Chapel".

== See also ==
- Media related to Islands of Chile at Wikimedia Commons
- Fjords and channels of Chile
- Archipelagoes of Patagonia
- Geography of Chile
- List of Chile-related topics
