= Men-of-War: Life in Nelson's Navy =

1974 book by Patrick O'Brian

- First American Edition 1995
- Author: Patrick O'Brian
- Language: English
- Subject: Life in the eighteenth-century Royal Navy
- Genre: Non-fiction
- Set in: Sabon
- Published: 1974
- Publisher: W. W. Norton & Company
- Publication place: United Kingdom
- Media type: Print
- Pages: 95
- ISBN: 0-393-32660-8

Men-of-War: Life in Nelson's Navy by Patrick O'Brian is a short, small-format 12.7 cm × 17.6 cm × 0.8 cm (5.00 in × 6.93 in × 0.31 in), illustrated introduction to life aboard the ships of the Royal Navy during the late eighteenth and early nineteenth centuries, the period in which the author's acclaimed Aubrey–Maturin series of novels is set. It was published in 1974.

== Publication history ==
- First published in hardcover in the UK in 1974.
- First paperback US edition published by W W Norton & Company in 1995.
- An audiobook was published by ISIS Audiobooks in 2007, combined with the last book in the Aubrey–Maturin series; The Final Unfinished Voyage of Jack Aubrey.
