= Testimonies (novel) =

1952 novel by Patrick O'Brian

- UK first edition
- Author: Patrick O'Brian
- Original title: (UK) Three Bear Witness
- Cover artist: Roy Sanford (1952 UK first edition); Geoff Hunt (1994 re-issue)
- Language: English
- Set in: Wales
- Publisher: Secker & Warburg (UK); Harcourt, Brace (US)
- Publication date: 1952
- Media type: Print
- Pages: 206

Testimonies is a 1952 novel, set in North Wales, by the English author Patrick O'Brian. It was first published in the UK under the title Three Bear Witness and in the US as Testimonies. The book was re-issued in 1993 (US) and 1994 (UK), both under the title Testimonies.

Although the book's first English reviews were not encouraging, its American reviews were quite different and in an influential article Delmore Schwartz highly praised the book at the expense of John Steinbeck, Evelyn Waugh, Angus Wilson and Ernest Hemingway. By 1994, O'Brian had become a well-known author with a high reputation for his Aubrey-Maturin nautical historical series of novels, and English reviewers of the re-issue were very complimentary of the quality of the writing.

== Plot ==
The story is constructed from the testimonies that three witnesses give to an unnamed divine inquisitor: Joseph Aubrey Pugh, an Oxford don; Bronwen Vaughan, the woman he comes to love; and Mr Lloyd, a schoolmaster.

Pugh says that he had been expecting the visitation, and that he will do his best to set down in writing what had taken place. According to his testimony, having become exhausted and demoralised by his academic life in Oxford, Pugh decides to rent a small cottage in North Wales for an extended break, intending to spend his time walking in the hills and reading. He throws himself into his new life, becoming friends with Emyr, son of the elderly owners of the neighbouring farm of Gelli, Mr and Mrs Vaughan. He helps out at Gelli to the best of his ability, though he disapproves of Emyr using strychnine to poison the foxes that threaten the farm's lambs. Gradually Pugh finds himself falling in love with Emyr's wife, Bronwen. On receiving an unexpected bequest, he abandons his academic career and takes the cottage as his permanent home.

The schoolmaster, Mr Lloyd, tells the inquisitor that Bronwen had been brought up in a different valley and that she was "not our sort". After marrying and coming to live at Gelli with Emyr and his parents she had been considered "proud" and was unpopular with the local women.

Bronwen testifies that her marriage was initially good, and she had a child, but that she became scared of Emyr when he became violent toward her one night. As her fear and hatred of Emyr became increasingly evident, his mother turned against her and daily life at Gelli became very difficult.

Pugh falls ill and moves to Gelli to recuperate. There he spends hours talking to Bronwen, and his love for her deepens. Mr Lloyd's cousin, a famous preacher by the name of Pritchard Ellis, comes to stay. He is revered by the local people for the power of his public oratory, but in private he is a hypocrite and sexual voyeur. After sexually touching Bronwen when they are alone, and being repulsed, he retaliates by spreading false rumours that Pugh and Bronwen are committing adultery. He preaches a powerful two-hour sermon in chapel denouncing Bronwen and Pugh's "wickedness", though without mentioning them by name, which results in their being ostracised by the community.

One night, Emyr is sexually violent to Bronwen again, and she tells the inquisitor that her husband nearly killed her. Pugh sees her the next day and realises what Emyr has done. He departs for a long and nightmarish walk through the mountains, contemplating suicide. Seriously injured, Bronwen is put to bed and a doctor is called. Old Mrs Vaughan comes in with some medicine and Bronwen, after taking a sip, realises immediately that it is laced with strychnine. She drinks it and dies. Pugh returns, utterly exhausted, and lies unconscious before being awakened to learn of Bronwen's fate.

== Background ==
The novel's setting is closely based on Cwm Croesor in North Wales, where O'Brian and his wife had rented a small cottage in 1945 as an escape from post-war London. The character of Pugh is semi-autobiographical, and his intended monograph The Bestiary Before Isidore of Seville was a subject that O'Brian later said he had himself been working on before the war. According to his step-son and biographer Nikolai Tolstoy, the fiction provided the flimsiest of veils for the author's deepest personal concerns. Tolstoy took the view that that Pugh – like O'Brian himself – sets himself up as a gentleman and adopts a new name appropriate to his improved status, about which he does not like to be questioned.

== Publication ==
The novel was first published in 1952, the UK version appearing under the title Three Bear Witness as O'Brian's publishers Secker & Warburg were of the view that his preferred title Testimonies would be difficult to sell. In the US it was published by Harcourt, Brace as Testimonies. Unaware that O'Brian had changed his name in 1945 from Richard Patrick Russ, many reviewers assumed the book to be the author's first, although under his new name he was in fact already the published editor of A Book of Voyages (1947), and author of The Last Pool (1950).

Geoff Hunt cover used on HarperCollins reissue

In 1994, the UK version was renamed Testimonies and re-published by HarperCollins with new cover art by Geoff Hunt, the cover-artist for the re-issued volumes of the Aubrey–Maturin series. Hunt illustrates a cottage almost identical with the real-life cottage in Cwm Croesor in North Wales that O'Brian and his wife had rented in 1945. In the US the novel was reissued in 1993 by Norton, again under the title Testimonies.

A dramatised adaptation of the book by Colin Haydn Evans was broadcast on BBC Radio 4 in 2002.

== Reception ==
=== First edition 1952 ===
Many of the first English reviews were not encouraging. An unnamed Times reviewer called the book "a slight and technically immature piece of work, loose-jointed and clumsy in construction to the point of amateurishness", though conceding that the book leaves an impression of genuine talent. The Times Literary Supplement considered it a quiet little story of much merit, while likewise holding its central literary device to be clumsy.

Not all were so negative, though. The Illustrated London News thought the novel intensely personal and ghastly in a quiet way, yet full of beauty and consolation, while a brief notice in the Daily Mirror called the story a jungle of human emotion, love, hate and the clash of wills.

The US reviews were uniformly positive. In an influential review in Partisan Review, Delmore Schwartz praised the book at the expense of John Steinbeck, Evelyn Waugh, Angus Wilson and Ernest Hemingway. Schwartz said: "To read a first novel by an unknown author which, sentence by sentence and page by page makes one say: he can't keep going at this pace, the intensity is bound to break down, the perfection of tone can't be maintained – is to rejoice in an experience of pleasure and astonishment ... [It] makes one think of a great ballad or a Biblical story ... The reader, drawn forward by lyric eloquence and the story's fascination, discovers in the end that he has encountered in a new way the sphinx and the riddle of existence itself." He concluded by comparing O'Brian's prose to the lyrics of the great Irish poet W. B. Yeats. In the 1994 re-issue, Schwartz's review was reprinted as a preface.

The New York Herald Tribune Book Review called it one of the finest books to come along for some time, while Saturday Review said that the story moves to its end with the rightness and inevitability we think of as Greek. Kirkus Reviews considered the novel to be of unassuming proportion and immaculate design.

In a long review, The New York Times Book Review dubbed the book "A rare and beautiful novel, deceptively modest in form, never faltering in the unobtrusive skill of its poetry and dramatic dimensions". The reviewer appreciated the author's handling of speech and the story's visual scene, the sympathetic portrayal of Bronwen being singled out for particular praise, with the character being compared, in some ways, with great heroines such as Anna Karenina.

=== Re-issue 1993/1994 ===
By the time of the novel's UK reissue as Testimonies in 1994, O'Brian had become a well-known author with a high reputation for his Aubrey-Maturin nautical historical series of novels. Writing in The Sunday Telegraph, Jessica Mann recognised O'Brian's early use in this novel of the surnames Aubrey and Maturin, and she asked how this book could possibly have been so completely neglected after its initial 1952 publication. She considered the author's evocation of place, and his handling of the characters' attitudes, motives and feelings elevated the story to one of perfect tragedy. The Independent commented on the writer's apparently effortless yet powerful evocation of emotion, and the way in which he brought very modern language to a story full of "ancient haunting purity".

Sophia Sackville-West for the Evening Standard praised the precision of the prose, the depth of the characterisations, and the story's "subtle but feverish tension". Reviewing the US re-issue, Kirkus Reviews likewise highlighted the precision of the prose, and suggested that it lends purity to a "quiet, tragic idyll".

== Bibliography ==
- Bennett, Stuart (1994). "Four Decades of Reviews". In Cunningham, A. E. (ed.). Patrick O'Brian: Critical Appreciations and a Bibliography. Boston Spa: The British Library. pp. 149–171. ISBN 0-7123-1070-3.
- King, Dean (2000). Patrick O'Brian: A life revealed. London: Hodder & Stoughton. ISBN 0-340-792558.
- Tolstoy, Nikolai (2004). Patrick O'Brian: The Making of the Novelist. London: Century Books. ISBN 0-7126-7025-4.
