= Joseph Banks: A Life =

Book by Patrick O'Brian

- Author: Patrick O'Brian
- Subject: Joseph Banks
- Publication date: 1987
- ISBN: 0-00-217350-6

Joseph Banks: A Life (1987) is a biography by Patrick O'Brian of the 18th-century English naturalist, botanist and explorer Joseph Banks. It was first published by The Harvill Press, London. O'Brian is better known for his Aubrey–Maturin series of historical novels based on the Royal Navy during the Napoleonic period. That series occasionally mentions Sir Joseph Banks in his role in the Royal Society, and has a main character and several occasional characters who pursue natural philosophy, observing and collecting specimens to add to scientific knowledge.

== Description ==
The biography covers Banks' life including his voyages to Newfoundland and the most famous episode, the three-year voyage of the HM Bark Endeavour, captained by James Cook. Banks voyaged to the Pacific which included visits to Tahiti and other islands in Polynesia, and the discovery of the east coast of Australia and the Great Barrier Reef. While Banks never again undertook a major voyage, he became one of the foremost men of science in the late 18th and early 19th centuries.
