= Richard Temple =

Richard Temple may refer to:

- Sir Richard Temple, 3rd Baronet (1634–1697), English politician and barrister
- Richard Temple, 1st Viscount Cobham (1675–1749), British Army field marshal and politician, son of the above
- Richard Temple (Downton MP) (c. 1726–1749), English member of parliament for Downton, 1747–1749
- Sir Richard Temple, 1st Baronet (1826–1902), British colonial administrator and politician
- Richard Temple (bass-baritone) (1847–1912), English opera singer, actor and stage director
- Sir Richard Carnac Temple (1850–1931), British colonial administrator and writer on India and Burma, son of Sir Richard Temple, 1st Baronet
- Richard Temple (novel), a novel by Patrick O'Brian

== See also ==
- Richard Grenville-Temple, 2nd Earl Temple (1711–1779), British politician, grandson of Sir Richard Temple, 3rd Baronet
- Richard Temple-Nugent-Brydges-Chandos-Grenville, 1st Duke of Buckingham and Chandos (1776–1839), British landowner and politician, great-nephew of the above
- Richard Temple-Nugent-Brydges-Chandos-Grenville, 2nd Duke of Buckingham and Chandos (1797–1861), British landowner and politician, son of the above
- Richard Temple-Nugent-Brydges-Chandos-Grenville, 3rd Duke of Buckingham and Chandos (1823–1889), British landowner, politician and colonial administrator, son of the above
- Richard Temple West (1827–1893), Church of England priest and academic
