= The Final Unfinished Voyage of Jack Aubrey =

Unfinished 2004 novel by Patrick O'Brian

- First edition cover
- Author: Patrick O'Brian
- Cover artist: Geoff Hunt
- Language: English
- Series: Aubrey-Maturin series
- Genre: Historical novel
- Publisher: HarperCollins (UK)
- Publication date: 2004
- Publication place: United Kingdom
- Media type: Print (Hardback & Paperback) & Audio Book (Compact audio cassette, Compact Disc)
- Pages: 144 first edition, hardback
- ISBN: 0-393-06025-X (first edition, hardback)
- OCLC: 55801030
- Dewey Decimal: 823/.914 22
- LC Class: PR6029.B55 A135 2004
- Preceded by: Blue at the Mizzen

The Final Unfinished Voyage of Jack Aubrey is the unfinished twenty-first historical novel in the Aubrey-Maturin series by English author Patrick O'Brian, first published in its incomplete form in 2004. It appeared in the United States of America under the title of 21.

== Editor's note, foreword and afterword ==
The published work appears with an "Editor's Note" by Starling Lawrence and an Afterword by Richard Snow, who had written an influential review of the series in the New York Times Book Review many years before. Commentators have credited Snow's review with helping to popularize the series in the United States.

There is a foreword in UK editions by William Waldegrave.

== Plot summary ==
The story begins with Surprise in the Strait of Magellan, caught up in foul weather. Hanson first spots Cape Pilar at the very opening of the Strait, and soon Surprise moors and conducts some trade with the inhospitable locals for meat and vegetables. Having re-provisioned, she and Ringle sail northwards in fine weather until they enter the River Plate and moor close to the island functioning as the main administrative centre. A quarantine officer comes aboard and gives the frigate a clean bill of health.

Wantage (a character killed and buried at sea in chapter six of the preceding book: Blue at the Mizzen) informs Maturin of a rumpus in the town: a fight between Protestant mariners from a Boston barque clash with the Catholic locals over the right of polygamy. Further signs of local resentment emerge when a large scow dumps the town's filth next to the frigate and the Portuguese sailors shout abuse at the Surprises. Aubrey sees the Papal legate on the shore, preparing to bless the town's ships, and recognises him as his own natural son Sam. As the Papal Nuncio to the Republic of Argentina, the Most Reverend Doctor Samuel Mputa had recently saved the government from an open rebellion.

The South African squadron, under its Commander-in-Chief Admiral Lord Leyton, makes its appearance. Taking command of the blue squadron, Aubrey boards his new flagship, HMS Suffolk, seeing his blue rear admiral's flag hoisted on the mizzen mast. He has an interview with the cantankerous Admiral, who wants to send two of his officers and a midshipman home to England on Surprise. Aubrey explains that he does not own the Surprise, a private vessel once more, but ultimately pledges Maturin's consent in exchange for enough prime hands to man the shorthanded Suffolk, its crew having been reduced by disease. Aboard Surprise, Aubrey tells the assembled hands that he can take 63 volunteers over to join him on Suffolk, and receives cheers.

While the fleet re-provisions, Ringle sails to England under the steady and capable Lieutenant Harding, and returns with Sophie Aubrey, Christine Wood, her brother Edward Heatherleigh, Maturin's daughter Brigid, and Aubrey's twins Fanny and Charlotte, all of whom will sail with Aubrey and Maturin to South Africa. The three girls had not been getting along well, with the Aubrey twins jealous of any attention their mother gives to young Brigid, a concern to both fathers. Brigid is a natural sailor, having been on the Ringle at a very young age for her voyage to Spain and on the packet to return to England. The twins are seasick most of the way to the River Plate, whereas Brigid is at home, friends with the sailors and ready with answers to everything aboard ship. When they meet their father, the twins have shed the jealousy and begin to have a kinder connection with their cousin Brigid.

On Leyton's flagship, Stephen and Jack encounter Captain Randolph Miller, Leyton's nephew and Aubrey's neighbour at Woolcombe, who has a reputation as a ladies' man and as an excellent pistol shot, earning him the nickname "Hair-Trigger Miller". In England, Miller had been paying court to Christine Wood. After hosting Aubrey and Maturin at a dinner, Admiral Leyton orders Aubrey to take Suffolk to Saint Helena, to wait there for Leyton's squadron, and then to proceed to the Cape of Good Hope, carrying Miller to Cape Town aboard Suffolk.

In the last few handwritten pages that follow the end of the typescript, the full squadron arrives at the southwest coast of Africa. While the ships remain docked in the town of Loando (modern-day Luanda, Angola) to refit after storm damage, the squadron's officers and families take up residence in a Portuguese military headquarters building. Stephen returns from ship's business to find Miller again visiting Christine, which Miller had done almost every day, bringing her flowers. After Stephen shows Miller the door, Christine asks him to intervene and convey her wish to Miller that the uninvited visits should stop.

Leyton orders the squadron to prepare for an exercise at sea. Stephen is in the town, accompanied by Harding and Jacob, when he meets Miller and delivers Christine's message. In response, Miller calls Stephen a liar and strikes him, and Stephen calmly calls him out. Miller demands pistols but Maturin stands upon his right, as the aggrieved party, to name the weapons; they will duel with swords. In response to Miller's complaints that he knows nothing of swords, Admiral Leyton and Miller's own seconds agree that the terms are fair, and that Miller must accept the challenge or be forever disgraced. The duel takes place, and with three or four thrusts Stephen disarms Miller and demands Miller's apology at swordpoint, which is given.

At the end of the manuscript, we observe Miller at sea on Leyton's flagship. Disrespected even by his own servant, Miller takes to his cabin, avoiding company and his duties on deck. He is seen to be sweating profusely and changing his uniform with uncommon frequency, apparently deeply disturbed by his loss of face in the duel.

== Characters ==
See also Recurring characters in the Aubrey–Maturin series

- Jack Aubrey – Rear-Admiral of the Blue Squadron, aboard HMS Suffolk.
- Stephen Maturin – ship's surgeon, natural philosopher, friend to Jack and an intelligence officer.
- The Most Reverend Doctor Samuel Mputa – Papal Nuncio to the Republic of Argentina, and Jack's natural son with Sally Mputa.
- Sophia Aubrey – Wife of Jack and mother of their three children.
- Charlotte and Fanny Aubrey – twin daughters of Sophia and Jack Aubrey.
- George Aubrey – their son, who is midshipman on another ship.
- Brigid Maturin – Stephen's daughter by his late wife, Diana Villiers.
- Christine Wood – Widow and an expert naturalist and anatomist; she received a marriage proposal from Maturin.
- Captain Randolph Miller – an Army officer who courts Christine Wood.
- Admiral Lord Leyton – Commander-in-Chief South African squadron who is also uncle of Captain Miller.
- Lieutenant Harding – First Lieutenant on the Surprise.
- Horatio Hanson – Acting master on the Surprise and natural son of the Duke of Clarence, the future William IV.
- Dr Amos Jacob – Assistant-surgeon and intelligence agent.
- Dr Quental – quarantine doctor.
- Awkward Davies – Able seaman who follows Aubrey from ship to ship.
- Preserved Killick – Jack's steward.
- Padeen Colman – Irish servant to Maturin who is close to Brigid Maturin.
- Mr Wells – Young midshipman on the Surprise.
- Captain Simmons – Captain of HMS Suffolk.
- Edward Heatherleigh – Christine Wood's brother and a renowned naturalist.
- Henry Wantage – Master's mate (although the character died in Blue at the Mizzen)

== Ships ==
- HMS Suffolk – Aubrey's flagship, a 74-gun man-of-war (named as HMS Implacable in Blue at the Mizzen)
- Surprise – 28-gun privately owned frigate
- Ringle – a schooner, privately owned by Jack and used as his tender.

== Unfinished manuscript ==
The book is the posthumous publication of an uncompleted typescript, published as a result of Patrick O'Brian's position as an accomplished author of historical sea fiction. It comprises the partially corrected typescript of the approximately three chapters completed by O'Brian before his death in January 2000, as well as a facsimile of the handwritten manuscript which continues beyond the end of the typescript.

The facsimile of O'Brian's handwritten script includes his doodling of placements for a fictitious on-board dinner party.

In a 1999 interview with Publishers Weekly, "O'Brian observes that he is already three chapters into his 21st. "I don't think I could rest easy unless I had a book on the go, you know," he says."

== Reviews ==
Joseph O'Connor says this is "... a preparatory exercise, a kind of setting-out; the literary equivalent of the twinkle in the eye. One wonders what a stylist as accomplished as the late Mr O'Brian would have made of the decision to publish such an unready fragment, but reading it sometimes feels like an act of intrusion. You can't help but sense that he might have regarded its appearance as tantamount to arriving at the captain's table clad only in knickers."

Charles McGrath, writing in the New York Times says "It's a keepsake, a souvenir, for those diehards who have already made the whole 6,443-page journey and want one last look at Jack and Stephen as they embark on yet another mission -- sailing around South America this time and on to South Africa." McGrath remarks that "The Aubrey-Maturin novels are to a certain extent a ship-in-the-bottle enterprise: a miniature world, lovingly rendered and hermetically sealed in a dustproof vacuum. That's what keeps them from attaining true greatness, perhaps, but it's another part of the appeal."

Kirkus Reviews praises O'Brian's writing overall, one of the 20th century's finest prose stylists, and W W Norton's decision to publish the partial text as it stood when the author died.

A lovely and welcome oddity: the much-loved author’s final fragment, titled simply by its position in the canon.

Correctly deciding that it would be impossible if not sacrilegious to hire a writer to complete successfully a work no more than a quarter finished, thereby placing one of the 20th-century’s finest prose stylists among the ranks of the undead that populate the thriller and crime shelves in the bookstores, Norton has instead taken the high road and released this tantalizing beginning as O’Brian left it. What his devoted readers will find is a lightly edited printing of the typescript, each page faced by a photocopy of the manuscript page from which it had been transcribed, and then, when the typed pages stopped, the handwritten pages alone. The effect is tantalizing, touching, and powerful. The story takes up with newly minted Admiral Jack Aubrey and his bosom friend and colleague, scholar-spy Dr. Stephen Maturin, rounding Cape Horn on Surprise, headed for the mouth of the River Plate, where Aubrey is to transfer his flag to a new squadron headed for new assignments off the Cape of Good Hope. Days of superbly calm sailing take them to the Argentine republic where, thanks to murderous local political storms, their welcome is cool if not hostile, a situation eased splendidly by the arrival of the Papal Nuncio, a supremely charming African polyglot who is also Aubrey’s illegitimate son, the happy result of an ancient liaison. When the squadron at last arrives under the command of the windbaggy peer Lord Leyton, it brings trouble in the form of Maturin’s old Trinity classmate Randolph Miller, a scoundrel who is also Lord Leyton’s cousin. There is a Confrontation and a duel, and then all sail for Africa by way of St. Helena. And there the story stops, ending in a superb afterword by Richard Snow.

It’s all there. The wonderful language. The leisurely pace. The rich detail. There’s just no end. Readers will be left to their dreams.

Publishers Weekly marks this fragment as a worthy addition to the series, marking the end of an era.

For Aubrey/Maturin addicts, there could be no better gift: a new, albeit incomplete, story with freshly piquant details, wry humor and salty nautical action. Although the official word was that O'Brian had finished the series with 1999's Blue at the Mizzen, he was in fact working on a new installment at the time of his death in 2000. This short volume juxtaposes a facsimile of O'Brian's handwritten manuscript of the untitled novel with a printed version of the text, which corresponds to O'Brian's loosely edited, typed pages. As the tale opens, our heroes are off the coast of South America, trying to find a friendly place to put the Surprise in for victuals and water. Jack Aubrey has received the happy news that he has been given the rank of rear admiral of the Blue, and all is well for the time being. But the Catholic locals are surly at best to the mostly Protestant crew. To fix things, Stephen Maturin does some judicious buttering up and Aubrey reunites with Samuel Mputa, the region's Papal Nuncio and, incidentally, one of his "indiscretions" from his days as "a long-legged youth" serving on the South African station. The typescript of the third chapter ends mid-sentence, but the handwritten manuscript continues on to include a duel between Maturin and a romantic rival, leaving readers begging for more. Alas, this fragmentary but worthy addition to the series is truly the end of a literary era, leaving only readers' imaginations to fill in the rest of the story. FYI: Norton is simultaneously publishing a five-volume boxed set of all the Aubrey/Maturin novels, which together have sold more than six million copies.

Library Journal notes that in this form, the uncompleted novel "provides an interesting look into the workings of one writer's mind. There is also a sweet, elegiac afterword by Richard Snow, the American Heritage magazine editor who was an early champion of O'Brian's work. While useful for literary scholars and O'Brian fans who wish to complete their sets, this volume is meaningless to new readers of the series and therefore of limited value to libraries."

== Publication history ==
Listed at Fantastic Fiction

- 2004, October HarperCollins; Hardback ISBN 0007194692
- 2004, October W. W. Norton; Hardback as 21: The Final Unfinished Voyage of Jack Aubrey ISBN 0-393-06025-X
- 2004 Recorded Books audio cassette as 21: The Final Unfinished Voyage of Jack Aubrey ISBN 1-4193-1278-2 / 978-1-4193-1278-6 (USA edition)
- 2004, January Recorded Books audio CD as 21: The Final Unfinished Voyage of Jack Aubrey ISBN 1-4193-1280-4 / 978-1-4193-1280-9 (USA edition)
- 2004, October Recorded Books audio CD as 21: The Final Unfinished Voyage of Jack Aubrey ISBN 1-4193-0893-9 / 978-1-4193-0893-2 (USA edition)
- 2005, April HarperCollins paperback ISBN 0-00-719470-6 / 978-0-00-719470-4 (UK edition)
- 2008, June Harper Perennial paperback ISBN 0-00-727564-1 / 978-0-00-727564-9 (UK edition)
- 2008, September Blackstone Audiobooks audio MP3/CD as 21: The Final Unfinished Voyage of Jack Aubrey ISBN 1-4332-2961-7 / 978-1-4332-2961-9 (USA edition)
- 2008 September Blackstone Audiobooks Audio CD as 21: The Final Unfinished Voyage of Jack Aubrey ISBN 1-4332-2958-7 / 978-1-4332-2958-9 (USA edition)
- 2008 September Blackstone Audiobooks Audio cassette as 21: The Final Unfinished Voyage of Jack Aubrey ISBN 1-4332-2957-9 / 978-1-4332-2957-2 (USA edition)
- 2010, April Harper paperback ISBN 0-00-735843-1 / 978-0-00-735843-4 (UK edition)
- 2010, April HarperCollins Audio CD ISBN 0-00-735871-7 / 978-0-00-735871-7 (UK edition) followed by Abridged version in May 2010
- 2010, September W. W. Norton paperback as 21: The Final Unfinished Voyage of Jack Aubrey ISBN 0-393-33933-5 / 978-0-393-33933-8 (USA edition)
- 2010, September W. W. Norton e-book as 21: The Final Unfinished Voyage of Jack Aubrey (USA edition)
- 2011, December Harper e-book (UK and Canada edition)
- 2012, June Blackstone Audio Audio CD as 21: The Final Unfinished Voyage of Jack Aubrey ISBN 1-4332-2960-9 / 978-1-4332-2960-2 (USA edition)

In the Afterword, Richard Snow noted that 5 million copies of the books in the series had been sold to date. In its review of 21, Publishers Weekly says that over 6 million copies have been sold. This represents an additional 3 million sales since Publishers Weekly reported sales as of 1999 in their review of Blue at the Mizzen

On the dust jacket of 21, the back includes an appreciation of O'Brian from Geoff Hunt, who drew covers for the 20 completed books of the series as well as for 21, beneath a monochrome drawing of a sailing ship.
