= Hussein, An Entertainment =

1938 novel by Patrick O'Brian

- First edition
- Author: Patrick O'Brian
- Language: English
- Genre: Adventure novel
- Publisher: Oxford University Press
- Publication date: 1938
- Publication place: United Kingdom
- Media type: Print (hardback)
- Pages: 300 pp
- Preceded by: Beasts Royal
- Followed by: The Last Pool and Other Stories

Hussein, an Entertainment is an early novel by Patrick O'Brian, published in 1938 under his birth name, Patrick Russ. The story takes place in India during the British Raj period and concerns the adventures of a young man named Hussein. The novel, called "an Entertainment" by O'Brian, follows Hussein's life from birth to his late teens. Though out of print for many years, Hussein was reprinted in the late 1990s under Patrick O'Brian's name. Kirkus UK described it as a book "to read for the fun of the 'entertainment' and the light that it throws on the development of one of the great writers of historical fiction."

== Plot summary ==
Hussein's family raises him in the mahout trade. At about 16 years old, he inherits the elephant named Jehangir Bahadur in the town of Haiderabad. At this time in his life Hussein falls in love with a well-off young woman named Sashiya, which embroils him with a rival, Kadir Baksh. Hussein pays a fakir to place a curse upon Kadir Baksh, which causes the young man to die and his family swears vengeance upon Hussein. After promising the elephant Jehangir he will return, Hussein sets out to live by his wits.

Hussein becomes an assistant to Feroze Khan, a man who practices the arts of snake charming and storytelling. Spying leads to Feroze Khan's murder in Peshawar, and Hussein resolves to put into practice the lessons he has learned about storytelling and snake charming. Succeeding in both pursuits, Hussein enhances his snake charming by buying additional snakes and a mongoose. He learns to perform a scam for seeming to rid a house of dangerous snakes by bribing the house servants and employing his mongoose.

When he follows another regiment in the rainy season, the leaders must send for elephants to pull their cannons from the mud. One of the elephants which arrives is his beloved Jehangir. Hussein and Jehangir run away together and have several adventures before reaching the village of Laghat, where Hussein buys fields with a tumbledown house. His dream is to prosper as a farmer, then send for Sashiya. When the crops fail because of drought, he is forced to borrow money from the local bunnia. When Hussein discovers the predatory terms of the loan, he attacks the bunnia and flees with Jehangir.

Hussein next encounters a man named Narain Ram, whom he had seen formerly when he worked for Feroze Khan. Hussein accepts money from Narain Ram and agrees to become his ally, accepting a position in Kappilavatthu working for the Rajah. He leaves Jehangir with the Rajah's mahouts and becomes a leopard keeper. Hussein distinguishes himself in the first hunt of the season, though he is injured. While Hussein recuperates, Narain arranges for him to become mahout for Jehangir. During a tiger hunt, Hussein and Narain steal a fortune in gold from the Rajah and run away with the gold hidden in a bag on Jehangir's back.

Hussein and Ram Narain reach Puniat safely with Jehangir, where they split the gold. Hussein uses his share to buy a ruby necklace for Sashiya and build them large house on his farm in Laghat.

== Origin and nature of the novel ==
Patrick O'Brian published stories as a teenager in annuals for scouts and annuals for boys through the Oxford University Press. A different publisher, Putnam, brought out his Beasts Royal, containing four previously published stories and eight new ones, in 1934. In reviewing Beasts Royal, The Times Literary Supplement singled out the Hussein stories as the choicest in the collection. O'Brian's editor at the Oxford University Press encouraged the youth to write a novel based on the Hussein stories. He followed this suggestion, using existing stories such as The Cheetah and The White Cobra, as well as composing new material. He was about 20 years old at the time, and still writing under his birth name as Patrick Russ. Sixty-one years later O'Brian reminisced about that period in his life in the foreword to the reprint of Hussein. He speaks of composing the new material, rarely less than a thousand words a day, and learning the rudiments of his calling in the process. The Oxford University Press distinguished Hussein with publication, making it the first full-length novel published in the centuries of its existence.

In the foreword to the reprint, O'Brian describes his sources for Hussein:

Although I had known some Indians, Muslim and Hindu, at that time I had never been to India, so the book is largely derivative, based on reading and on the recollections, anecdotes and letters of friends of relations who were well acquainted with that vast country...

O'Brian was credited in The New York Times with establishing a sense of place, this despite his youth and lack of experience visiting India. To accomplish this sense of place he recreates a culture rife with intrigue, unpredictability and treachery.

Hussein has been called a "delicious blend of Kipling and the Arabian Nights." As the New York Times reviewer wrote, "...there is barely a moment to catch your breath before Hussein dives into another adventure." Years later, "examining humanity through the friendship of two men" would become a hallmark of O'Brian's well-known Aubrey-Maturin series of novels. In Hussein there is an early indication of this technique as O'Brian creates a "witty duel" between Hussein and Yussuf, ostensibly about a cheetah's collar, but also about opium and the handling of cheetahs. The author demonstrates in this scene why the San Francisco Chronicle wrote that, "O'Brian's books are novels of manners...," despite their use of adventure. The reviewer states,

...O'Brian's favorite writer was Jane Austen, and the books can best be thought of as companion volumes to her novels, with formal differences in rank replacing the differences in social position that intrigued her, and the complicated friendships of men replacing the complicated negotiations of courtship.

In the scenes with Hussein and his sweetheart, Sashiya, O'Brian employs a dry wit as he creates the pair's fascination with the "peculiarly unoriginal" expressions which lovers use.

To write Hussein, O'Brian masters the art of eastern storytelling, so different from western storytelling. He casts his young hero as a person who grows in ability as a teller of stories. First he learns from his master, Feroze Khan, how to suit the story to the audience. Later he is accepted into a storytellers' guild. Finally, he succeeds with his tale of the Prince of Kathiawar before a critical jury of Ram Narain and the two men who are pursuing the perpetrators of the mischief in Kappilavatthu. After this, O'Brian describes Hussein as "imbued with the spirit of tales through the telling of them." Conceivably this is a significant statement, for O'Brian is distinguished as a skilful teller of stories, himself.

== Hussein's character ==
Hussein is brought to life in O'Brian's writing as a character who experiences desires and passions which transport him well beyond the status of a cardboard figure. Transgressions can give Hussein a human dimension, as when he takes credit for bringing Jehangir out of a fit of "mûsth," and later when he elaborates on the truth of the wild dog and thief-capture adventures, in both instances making himself appear more important. Questions about Hussein's activities can invite moral judgment. The wealth which he acquires at the end of the novel is a fortune in gold which he and Ram Narain have taken from the owners. Initially the mere contemplation of gaining the gold stirred him so strongly he was tempted to kill Ram Narain to gain the entire fortune. In an action beyond the imaginary, Hussein pays a fakir to place a fatal curse upon Kadir Baksh, his rival for Sashiya. Again, when the bunnia, Purun Dass, tricks him of his money, Hussein resorts to drink and attacks the priest violently while under the influence of alcohol. He also fails to return Jehangir to his owner, the Public Service Department, after the elephant deserts.

Throughout much of the novel Hussein's understanding of elephants and his simpatico relationship with Jehangir are evident. In addition, he forms attachments with his mongoose, Jalludin, and the cheetah, Shaitan, to which he is assigned at the Rajah of Kappilavatthu's palace. Shaitan becomes so attached to Hussein that he, like Jehanigir, pines and grows thin while Hussein is confined to bed while recuperating from the wounds inflicted by a wild leopard.

== Mahouts and their elephants ==
Hussein speaks to the relationship of mahout and elephant. Elephants are shown as highly sympathetic creatures in relations with their mahouts. Early in the book, the elephant known as Muhammad Akbar, who worked with both Hussein's grandfather and father, grieves so deeply over the deaths of the two men in the cholera epidemic, that he stops eating and dies. There is also a deep bond which develops between Hussein and Jehangir Bahadur. The reader sees thoughtfulness on Hussein's side, as he refuses an attractive future with the "Stant Sahib," Gill, to stay with the elephant. He also makes a point of telling Jehangir he is leaving but will return, and taking comfort that the elephant understands him, when he must flee to escape the vengeance of Kadir Baksh's family. When they are reunited, O'Brian describes Jehangir as Hussein's "own very greatly beloved elephant." For his part, Jehangir has suffered "none to remain with him more than a few weeks," waiting for Hussein. O'Brian describes their reunion as

...a scene that could not have been surpassed if the elephant had been a bride and Hussein a delayed bridegroom, just arrived in safety from the wars.

At the end of the book, when Hussein becomes rich and builds a house, he ensures that Jehangir's quarters are "notable," with everything an elephant might desire.

Jehangir is seen as capable of making reasoned decisions, as when he considers whether an old yogi is a threat to Hussein and when he breaks his chains and kidnaps the beaten, sleeping youth. In another case, he refuses to remain away from Hussein when ordered to do so, because he believes him to be in a dangerous situation. Thus, he is able to save Hussein's life by killing a man-eating tiger. In the fifth chapter he decides to leave Hussein during the night to return to wild elephant behaviour, which he remembers from his brief time in the wild as a young elephant. He engages in battle with a wild bull elephant in the mating ritual, but returns to camp by daybreak "looking very innocent."

The mahout-elephant team is shown in the usual guidance in heavy tasks, but it is also seen extending into danger. On one occasion Hussein directs Jehangir to charge another elephant and fight him. On another, Hussein is threatened by a rhinoceros. He calls Jehangir, who comes to his rescue and fights the beast.

Twice during book, concern for Hussein causes Jehangir to go off his feed. In the first case, Hussein has been badly beaten by Kadir Baksh and his associates. Jehangir feels something is wrong when Hussein is recuperating in a hospital for a week, and he grows thin in his anxiety. Later, when Hussein is injured by a leopard, Jehangir remains for a month outside the house where his master is recuperating and grows thin.

Jehangir experiences other qualities associated with humans. In the first instance, he feels shame. Before the following passage he briefly passes through a fit described as "mûsth," in which he became temporarily crazed and destructive.

But the next day Jehangir was punished in the only way that an elephant can be. He was chained firmly to a tree, and each of the other elephants was given a good length of chain. They all filed past him, and each gave him a great blow with the chain; they went round three times. Jehangir was bitterly ashamed of himself, and he trumpeted in the night, but Hussein came and comforted him until the morning.

Jehangir also becomes "really jealous" when Hussein falls for Sashiya and begins visiting her.

== Reception ==
When published in 1938, Hussein, An Entertainment received a British review in the Times Literary Supplement. Patrick O'Brian's biographer, Dean King, calls this review "most notable for the fact that this important literary newspaper noticed the book at all." In the United States The Times printed a review by Percy Hutchinson which called Hussein "a gorgeous entertainment not only in the story which it unfolds but also in the manner of the telling." The reviewer of the New York Herald Tribune, Thomas Sugrue, wrote that Hussein "turned out as fortunately as Ben Franklin's attempt to catch lightning in a jar. The story of Hussein is a swift-moving, well written account of events so fantastic that moonshine was certainly their mother." In another contemporary American notice, the 9 July issue of the Saturday Review of Literature called it "excellent entertainment for a thousand and second Arabian Night."

After its reprint, David Sexton wrote in the Evening Standard,

Here fully thirty years before Master and Commander was published is the unmistakable texture of O'Brian's historical fiction. Hussein has it all: the immersion in another world, full of local colour, the delight in a specialised vocabulary, the relish of male camaraderie, travel, treasure and fighting.

The Kirkus UK review states, "the reader can feel that joy in the drive and power of the writing, which, although almost incredibly exuberant is full of invention and fire that sweeps disbelief aside with the conviction of story telling."

== See also ==
- Asian elephant
