= Blue at the Mizzen =

1999 novel by Patrick O'Brian

- First edition cover
- Author: Patrick O'Brian
- Cover artist: Geoff Hunt
- Language: English
- Series: Aubrey-Maturin series
- Genre: Historical novel
- Publisher: HarperCollins (UK)
- Publication date: 1999
- Publication place: United Kingdom
- Media type: Print (Hardback & Paperback) & Audio Book (Compact audio cassette, Compact Disc)
- Pages: 320 first edition, hardback
- ISBN: 0-393-04844-6
- OCLC: 42291109
- Dewey Decimal: 823/.914 21
- LC Class: PR6029.B55 B57 1999
- Preceded by: The Hundred Days
- Followed by: The Final Unfinished Voyage of Jack Aubrey

Blue at the Mizzen is the twentieth and last completed historical novel in the Aubrey-Maturin series by Patrick O'Brian, first published in 1999. It is set after the Napoleonic wars, in the fight for Chilean independence from Spain.

Jack Aubrey and Stephen Maturin, having heard the details of Napoleon's defeat at Waterloo and having collected their share of the prize from their last capture, set sail for the dual mission of charting the Chilean coast and aiding those who seek independence from Spain. Maturin and his colleague Dr Amos Jacob speed the plot as covert intelligence agents and Aubrey's political advisors, while Aubrey makes bold moves in dealing with the factions in Chile.

Reviewers were positive about this novel, finding it "a shining jewel", "an intricate, multifaceted work -- one of those rare novels that actually bear up under close scrutiny." The "deeper sense of the culture of the age" that marks the series is also true of this novel, which shows the "period of deflation, both economic and emotional" for the Royal Navy and its associated businesses after the victory. The new midshipman introduced in this novel, and Maturin's new love, are well-liked. The young man is "a dashing young foil for the ship's elders", who shows that the main characters have aged and their pace has changed. The voyage to Chile treats readers once again "to O'Brian's talent for life on board, incidents and accidents". Aubrey has earned a "just reward" at the end, made an admiral of the blue. Feelings about the series as a whole are also positive, and strongly stated: ""There is nothing in this century that rivals Patrick O'Brian's achievement in his chosen genre."; and readers can so easily enter this fictional world, because "O'Brian did the hard learning long ago and then began to write with fully justified assurance and pleasure."

== Plot summary ==
The Surprise sails out of Gibraltar but collides in the dark with a Nordic timber ship and returns for repairs. Back ashore, Aubrey hears a reliable description of the battle at Waterloo; he thanks Lord Keith for moving the prize court along briskly to share out their huge prize from capturing the gold meant to aid Napoleon before his fall, more than 382 pounds a share. Aubrey has clandestine visits with his cousin Isobel, Lord Barmouth's wife. Admiral Lord Barmouth hastens the repair work, realizing he helps himself that way. Many Surprises desert. The frigate sails to Madeira for more serious repairs but arrives just in time to see Coelho's famous shipyard at Funchal in flames. Maturin receives a coded report from Dr Amos Jacob regarding the Chilean situation and takes the Ringle to England, where Sir Joseph Blaine updates him. The Chileans have split into two factions: northern still interested in British help, and southern retaining the services of Sir David Lindsay to command the Chilean navy. Whilst Maturin stays with Sophie Aubrey at Woolcombe, Aubrey returns the Surprise to Seppings' yard in England for a thorough re-fit and recruits a strong, competent crew out of Shelmerston for the long voyage ahead. In London, the Duke of Clarence asks Aubrey to accept Horatio Hanson as a midshipman. Initially reluctant, Aubrey finds that the boy has the mathematical skills essential for a navigator and he becomes a competent sailor. Fully fitted, the Surprise stops at Funchal, picking up Jacob, and then heads for Freetown, where Maturin proposes marriage to a young attractive widow named Christine Wood. She shares his tastes for natural philosophy, but her view of marriage suffered from her first marriage, as her husband was impotent and she turns him down. She agrees on her upcoming trip to England to visit the Aubreys at their home in Dorset and to meet Maturin's daughter Brigid there. Surprise then sails to the coast of Brazil, where Dr Amos Jacob parts to cross the mountains overland.

After a difficult rounding of Cape Horn, the expedition reaches San Patricio in Chile. Ringle goes for repairs following a grounding in the Pillón passage. After a meeting between Aubrey, Maturin and Sir David Lindsay, in which the two sides agree to mutually support each other, Maturin writes to Blaine describing the different juntas and the training of three republican sloops by the crew of the Surprise, who assist in capturing a moderate privateer. After meeting Dr Jacob with the intelligence he gathered, Aubrey heads to Valparaiso, while Maturin and Jacob ride there by mule. Here they meet General Bernardo O'Higgins, the Supreme Director, and Colonel Eduardo Valdes. Learning that the viceroy of Peru, under the Spanish king, plans to invade Chile, the group determine to confront the Royalist forces at Valdivia, where the viceroy will need to seek stores. The Surprise and Ringle make sail and Aubrey elaborates a plan to drop Chilean troops at Concepción while the ships destroy the gun-emplacements at Cala Alta and then bombard the fort at Valdivia.

The plan succeeds and the revolutionaries capture four chests of silver and one of gold, conveyed by the Surprise to Valparaiso and then overland to Santiago. Sir David fights a duel with one of his officers and dies. Popular local sentiment gradually turns against the British, and Aubrey receives news that the junta plans to impound his frigate. He decides to pre-empt action against Surprise by cutting out the Peruvian fifty-gun frigate Esmeralda at Callao in Peru to strengthen the Chilean navy. Surprise conducts a hard-fought broadside action and eventually the British-Chilean force takes the ship. Aubrey suffers wounds in the thigh and shoulder. Maturin and Jacob send a coded message of the successful cutting-out to Sir Joseph Blaine which the schooner takes to the Isaac Newton, as Dobson's friends agree to carry the message across Panama to meet a returning merchantman. Ringle carries the news to Valparaiso.

The President of the Valparaiso junta, Don Miguel Carrera, gives Aubrey and his officers a lavish dinner, after which Aubrey insists on his sailors receiving their share of the prize-money and Esmeralda's value by the end of the month. The next day Don Miguel authorizes five thousand pieces of eight and use of any naval stores the Surprise requires. With a fully repaired ship, Aubrey sets about training the young Chilean naval officers as the Surprise continues her survey of the Chilean coast for several weeks. Jacob arrives from Valparaiso on a private brig, with coded messages from Sir Joseph Blaine. First, the Duke of Clarence requests Horatio Hanson's return to sit his lieutenant's examination. Second, the Admiralty promotes Aubrey to Rear Admiral of the Blue, requiring him to take command of the South African squadron aboard HMS Implacable at the River Plate, hoisting his flag, blue at the mizzen. Carrera arrives with a message saying it will take a further three months to complete the payments, releasing Aubrey from his responsibility to the Chileans. Aubrey sets course for the Strait of Magellan.

== Characters ==
- Jack Aubrey: Post Captain of HMHV Surprise, promoted to a Rear Admiral of the Blue in the Royal Navy
- Stephen Maturin: Ship's surgeon, physician, natural philosopher, friend to Jack, widower, and intelligence agent
- Sophia Aubrey: Wife of Jack and mother of their three children.
- Charlotte and Fanny Aubrey: Twin daughters of Jack and Sophia Aubrey.
- George Aubrey: Son of John and Sophia Aubrey, now midshipman on HMS Lion with Captain Heneage Dundas.
- Philip Aubrey: Much younger half brother of Jack, midshipman in the Royal Navy.
- Brigid Maturin: Daughter of Stephen Maturin and his late wife Diana Villiers.
- Padeen Colman: Maturin's Irish servant, now part of his household on land.
- Sarah and Emily Sweeting: God-daughters of Maturin since he rescued them from a Melanesian island, who live with Mrs Broad at the Grapes. Introduced in The Nutmeg of Consolation.
- Mrs Clarissa Andrews: Wife of the rector of Wytherton, née Harvill. Widow of Lieutenant Oakes and once governess for Brigid Maturin, now living apart from the Maturin household. Introduced in Clarissa Oakes.
- John Leicester: Nephew to Attorney Lawrence, agricultural agent for the estate Aubrey inherited from cousin Edward, whose plan for the unproductive land has been successful, with tenants still in place, rents paid, and crops harvested.
- Christine Wood: Widow of Sierra Leone Governor, natural philosopher and now pursued by Maturin in Freetown.

In Gibraltar or aboard Surprise

- Colonel Roche: Wellington's aide-de-camp at Waterloo who dines with Royal Navy officers in Gibraltar.
- Lord Barmouth: Commander-in-Chief of Mediterranean Fleet.
- Lady Barmouth: His wife, and cousin to Jack Aubrey.
- Lord Keith: Retired admiral, good friend to Aubrey.
- Queeney, Lady Keith: Wife of Lord Keith and childhood friend of Jack Aubrey.
- Mr Harding: First Lieutenant on the Surprise.
- Mr Somers: Second Lieutenant on the Surprise.
- Mr Whewell: Third Lieutenant on the Surprise.
- Mr Woodbine: Master on the Surprise, old and experienced. He dies of unknown causes after the ship rounds Cape Horn.
- Mr John Daniel: Master's mate on Surprise, one who loves numbers and has strong navigational skills. Promoted to Sailing Master on the death of Mr Woodbine.
- Preserved Killick: Aubrey's steward who also tends to Maturin.
- Grimble: Killick's mate.
- Latham: Jack's new coxswain.
- Awkward Davies: Long-serving able seaman who befriends Hanson, and kills the man who wounded Aubrey in the leg in the action to cut out the Esmeralda.
- Joe Plaice: Long-serving able seaman.
- Mrs Poll Skeeping: Loblolly girl in the sick bay of Surprise.
- Mr Wells: Young midshipman on the Surprise, a first-voyager.
- Mr David Adams: Captain Aubrey's clerk, introduced in The Nutmeg of Consolation.
- Mr William Reade: Midshipman and master's mate, who is most often commander of the Ringle. He lost an arm in action, now using a hook; he was introduced in The Thirteen Gun Salute.

Met in Madeira

- Dr Amos Jacob: Assistant surgeon aboard Surprise, physician colleague of Maturin, linguist and intelligence officer.
- Mr Henry Wantage: Master's mate on Surprise, still at Madeira since he failed to come aboard at the end of The Yellow Admiral and invited to rejoin. Died of yellow fever after leaving Freetown.

Met in England

- Sir Joseph Blaine: Head of Intelligence at the Admiralty.
- William, Duke of Clarence: Younger brother to the Prince Regent and a sailor who rose to captain; he was once treated by Maturin and ever after his admirer.
- Mr Horatio Hanson: Duke's beloved illegitimate son, who knows the Duke as a friend of the family, taken aboard Surprise as a midshipman. Promoted to master's mate upon the death of Mr Wantage, ahead of Daniel due to long sea time on record. In the cutting-out expedition, he did well, coming after Davies to fight off those who would attack the fallen Aubrey.

Met in the doldrums

- Mr Lodge: Captain of USS Delaware, he met Aubrey in Boston (The Fortune of War). They meet again in the doldrums, Delaware having rounded Cape Horn.
- Mr Wilkins: Master of USS Delaware, who has two chronometers not matching, impairing navigation.
- Dr Evans: Surgeon aboard USS Delaware who knew Michael Herapath (Desolation Island and The Fortune of War) and his recent successes in medicine and Chinese poetry.

Met in Chile

- Austin Dobson: Entomologist and Fellow of the Royal Society who inherited a great sum; he used it to purchase the vessel that previously served as the "Lisbon packet", fitting it out for a scientific voyage with several other Fellows and renaming the vessel Isaac Newton. He is on the Chilean coast at the same time as the Surprise.
- Sir David Lindsay: Former Post-Captain in the Royal Navy, dismissed for calling his Admiral out to duel, and now ex officio commander of the Chilean navy, aligned with the groups in the south of Chile. He is quick to take offense and is killed in a duel with one of his officers.
- Don Bernardo O'Higgins: Supreme Director of Chilean revolutionaries, and supporter of Aubrey.
- José de San Martín: Leader for independence along with O'Higgins; Maturin spoke with him in Peru in The Wine-Dark Sea, but he seems not to be in full support of Aubrey in the present mission.
- General Eduardo Valdes: General in the Chilean revolutionary army, and a cousin to Maturin.
- Don Miguel Carrera: President of the local junta in Valparaiso.

== Ships ==
British

- HM hired hydrographical vessel Surprise - twenty-eight gun frigate
- Ringle - tender to Surprise, by design a Baltimore clipper
- Isaac Newton - a private research vessel, previously the Lisbon packet ship, carrying several Fellows of the Royal Society on a scientific voyage
- HMS Implacable (1805)

American

- USS Delaware - Captain Lodge

Chilean

- O'Higgins - ancient heavy frigate ex Spanish navy (name changed to San Martin after Esmeralda is taken)
- Asp - ex-Royal Navy; being re-fitted in Chile

Spanish

- Esmeralda - 50 gun frigate

== Title ==
A Blue Ensign at the mizzen-mast indicated the presence of a Rear Admiral of the Blue, the lowest flag-rank in the Royal Navy of the early 19th century.

== Allusions/references to actual history and current science ==
=== History ===
The main plot loosely echoes Lord Cochrane's setting up and commanding the Chilean Navy from 1818 to the early 1820s. A historical figure from Chile's independence movement, Don Bernardo O'Higgins, also features in the book. O'Higgins captured the Spanish frigate Esmeralda in 1820, a bit later than in this novel.

=== Natural history ===
Whilst in Sierra Leone, Christine Wood shows Stephen Maturin a prodigious amount of wildlife, including:

- an elephantine heron (Ardea goliath)
- a nightjar with elongated flight feathers (Shaw's Caprimulgus longipennis)
- a feather from the Congo peacock (Afropavo congensis)

Sailing in the Atlantic out of Shelmerston, a pod of seven right whales, Eubalaena glacialis, swam past the Surprise, one surfacing to clear the blow hole, evoking a former whaler's cry, not a proper Royal Navy communication (thar she blows).

=== Coca leaves ===
In Peru, Maturin and Jacob also have a discussion about coca-leaves. Maturin keeps his leaves in his inner pocket in a pouch, along with the lime and necessary outer wrapping. Maturin expresses curiosity about their use in considerable quantities, and the resultant reaction according to altitude. He cites the porters in the Peruvian Andes, who increase their dose if they have to carry a heavy burden over a very high pass.

Jacob mentions that many sorts of coca exist. For example, the Tia Juana; and that asthmatic patients and those afflicted by migraines often experience hallucinations, their strength and frequency varying with the height.

== Allusions to real places ==
Shelmerston, the home port of HMHV Surprise since she was bought out of the service by Maturin is fictional, but based on a real place on the western coast of England, Appledore near the River Torridge in Devon. Funchal is the long time capital of the island of Madeira, part of Portugal. Gibraltar is real, a British base in the Mediterranean Sea. Freetown was the government center for British West Africa, and is now the capital of Sierra Leone. The southern tip of South America, Cape Horn, is at best a hard voyage for a sailing ship. Valdivia, Concepción, Valparaíso, and Santiago are real places in Chile. Callao is a port city in Peru, and was part of the Viceroyalty of Peru before it became independent from Spain. The Strait of Magellan is the passage from the Atlantic to the Pacific Ocean north of Tierra del Fuego discovered by Magellan. For sailing vessels going east to west, the Strait is more challenging, due to its narrowness and prevailing westerly winds, than rounding Cape Horn, which is further south. Going west to east, the Strait was faster if the season was right.

== Reviews ==
Kirkus Reviews likes the new character Horatio Hanson, marks the growing number of readers following this series, and hopes, as do most of the reviewers, (in vain) for another novel to follow this, as this novel is "escape at its most intelligent and demanding." This novel sees Maturin fall in love again, and introduces a young midshipman for Aubrey to nurture, and described Aubrey aboard Surprise attacks the Spanish fleet as the climax of this novel.

Publishers Weekly thinks readers may find this novel the best of the series, with Maturin's love letters "functioning as a chorus to the action." The naval actions along the Chilean coast earn Aubrey a "just reward". They noted also the introduction of "Horatio Hanson, bastard son of a nobleman, who comes on board as a midshipman, a dashing young foil for the ship's elders." The comparison to Jane Austen's writing is made again for this novel: "O'Brian has rightfully been compared to Jane Austen, but one wonders if even she would have done justice to "those extraordinary hollow dwellings, sometimes as beautiful as they were comfortless.""

Writing in The New York Times, Amanda Foreman remarks that Blue at the Mizzen is "a shining jewel" and "an intricate, multifaceted work -- one of those rare novels that actually bear up under close scrutiny." Of O'Brian's popularity with the series, she says "Here was a writer who deliberately challenged you to keep pace." As to the question of the ending of the series, "Blue at the Mizzen could indeed be the finale. In a sense the heroes have clearly reached their destinations, and there is a psychological completeness to the novel even though the plot is inconclusive. Halfway through their adventures, while visiting Sierra Leone, Maturin experiences an emotional rebirth." For Aubrey, his long-sought goal is given by the book's title, indicating he gets promoted to rear admiral of the Blue. Foreman feels that the author's view is "the end [is] less important than the journey itself." She closes with words of strong praise: "There is nothing in this century that rivals Patrick O'Brian's achievement in his chosen genre. His novels embrace with loving clarity the full richness of the 18th-century world. They embody the cruelty of battle, the comedy of men's lives, the uncertain fears that plague their hearts; and yet, not far away, is the vision of an ideal existence."

John Casey, writing in The Washington Post wrote that O'Brian covered the "year after Waterloo, so it necessarily deals with a period of deflation, both economic and emotional, for the Royal Navy and its ancillary population of shipwrights, chandlers and seamen on the beach." and that he addressed "this state of affairs succinctly and sharply in the first part of the story." Then the two main characters have their mission to aid Chile, and "Of course Jack and Stephen must sail there, and readers are treated to O'Brian's talent for life on board, incidents and accidents". The narrative is primarily from Aubrey and Maturin, but "occasional glimpses from other perspectives that both give a capsule story -- in this case a sense of a calculated marriage -- and also provide contrast: Jack, for all his faults, is not "capable of a shabby thing.""

Casey assessed the overall appeal of the series, of Aubrey and Maturin, noting the "political sophistication", "a deeper sense of the culture of the age" and the early introduction in the series of "two strong women with quite different attitudes to life", Sophia Aubrey and her cousin Diana Villiers. The different specialty knowledge of each man, Aubrey with his full complement of nautical skills and Maturin the learned physician, naturalist and linguist, allows the author to have conversations where "From time to time the two men fill each other in expertly, briskly and even wittily, and the reader is the third-party beneficiary." A more generally appealing feature of the novels, perhaps what draws women to the series as well as men, was "the friendship between the two men", a plausible intimacy. Casey offered that readers can so easily enter this fictional world, because "O'Brian did the hard learning long ago and then began to write with fully justified assurance and pleasure."

Harry Wessel in the Orlando Sentinel appreciates Aubrey's frustrations in peacetime, now that Napoleon is defeated. Yet there is more for Aubrey and Maturin to do. "It turns out there is a lot they can do. The political intrigue in revolutionary Chile is right up Stephen's alley, while Jack's fighting skills also are called into play, culminating in a satisfying naval action that, as always, brims with historically accurate detail."

Writing in The Guardian, Jan Morris says the "chronicle has aged too. It has lost something of its sprightly edge, its allusions are mistier and its pace is slower. This is in no way a criticism. As the Frenchman said: 'Le style est l'homme même', and just as Aubrey is no longer the exuberant young commander of the early novels, so O'Brian's narrative has matured with him. So have we."

== Publication history ==
English language editions listed for UK and USA markets

- 1999, November HarperCollins hardback ISBN 978-0-00-225959-0 (UK edition)
- 1999, November W. W. Norton hardback ISBN 978-0-00-022595-5 (USA edition)
- 1999, November Soundings Lrd audio cassette ISBN 978-1-86042-684-1 (UK edition)
- 1999, November HarperCollins audio cassette ISBN 978-0-00-105581-0 (UK edition)
- 1999, November Random House Audio audio cassette ISBN 978-0-375-40876-2 (USA edition)
- 1999, December HarperCollins paperback ISBN 978-0-00-226128-9 (UK edition)
- 1999, December Recorded Books audio cassette ISBN 978-0-7887-3769-5 (USA edition)
- 1999 Books on Tape MP3/CD audio book ISBN 978-0-7366-7680-9 (USA edition)
- 1999 Recorded Books audio CD ISBN 978-0-7887-4204-0 (USA edition)
- 1999 Books on Tape audio cassette ISBN 978-0-7366-4737-3 (USA edition)
- 2000, January Thorndike Press hardback ISBN 978-0-7862-2046-5 (USA edition)
- 2000, January Chivers Large Print hardback ISBN 978-0-7540-1388-4 (UK edition)
- 2000, March Books on Tape audio cassette ISBN 978-0-7366-4686-4 (USA edition)
- 2000, March Books on Tape audio CD ISBN 978-0-7366-4760-1 (USA edition)
- 2000, August Harper paperback ISBN 978-0-00-651378-0 (UK edition)
- 2000, September W. W. Norton paperback ISBN 978-0-393-32107-4 (USA edition)
- 2000, September Thorndike Press paperback ISBN 978-0-7862-2047-2 (USA edition)
- 2000, September Soundings Ltd audio CD ISBN 978-1-86042-929-3 (UK edition)
- 2001, March Chivers Large Print paperback ISBN 978-0-7540-2292-3 (UK edition)
- 2007, May Blackstone Audio MP3/CD ISBN 978-1-4332-0255-1 (USA edition)
- 2008 Playaway audio ISBN 1-60775-470-3 (USA edition)
- 2008, February Blackstone Audio audio cassette ISBN 978-1-4332-0894-2 (USA edition)
- 2008, June Harper Perennial paperback ISBN 978-0-00-727563-2 (UK edition)
- 2011, W. W. Norton & Company e-book edition ISBN 978-0-393-08850-2 (USA edition)
- 2011, Harper e-book edition ASIN B006FH2W76 (UK and Canada edition)
- 2014, December Audible Studios (UK and USA editions)

Publishers Weekly noted that over three million copies of the books in the Aubrey-Maturin series have been sold, by November 1999.

Kirkus Reviews wrote that "O'Brian announced long ago that he hoped to write 20 volumes in his series centering on the British Navy during the Napoleonic Wars and featuring Jack Aubrey and Stephen Maturin. Along the way, he has built up a huge British following, if a lesser one in the States, although American reviewers find the series splendidly literate. And so here is volume 20, which finds Napoleon defeated at Waterloo and Jack and now-widower Stephen at Gibraltar, sent on a mission to release Spain's naval stranglehold on Chile and help Chile gain her independence." This is the last completed novel in the series.
