= Dog watch =

Work shift in a maritime watch system

A dog watch is a work shift, also known as a "watch", in a maritime watch system that is half the length of a standard watch period. This is typically formed by splitting a single four-hour watch period between 16:00 and 20:00 (4 pm and 8 pm) to form two two-hour dog watches, with the "first" dog watch from 16:00 to 18:00 (4 pm to 6 pm) and the "second" or "last" dog watch from 18:00 to 20:00 (6 pm to 8 pm).

This watch exists because, in order for the crew to rotate through all the watches, it is necessary to have an odd number of watches in a ship's day. Splitting one of the watches in half allows the sailors to stand different watches instead of one team being forced to stand the mid-watch every night. The choice of time also allows both watches, if there are only two, to eat an evening meal at about the traditional time.

== Etymology ==
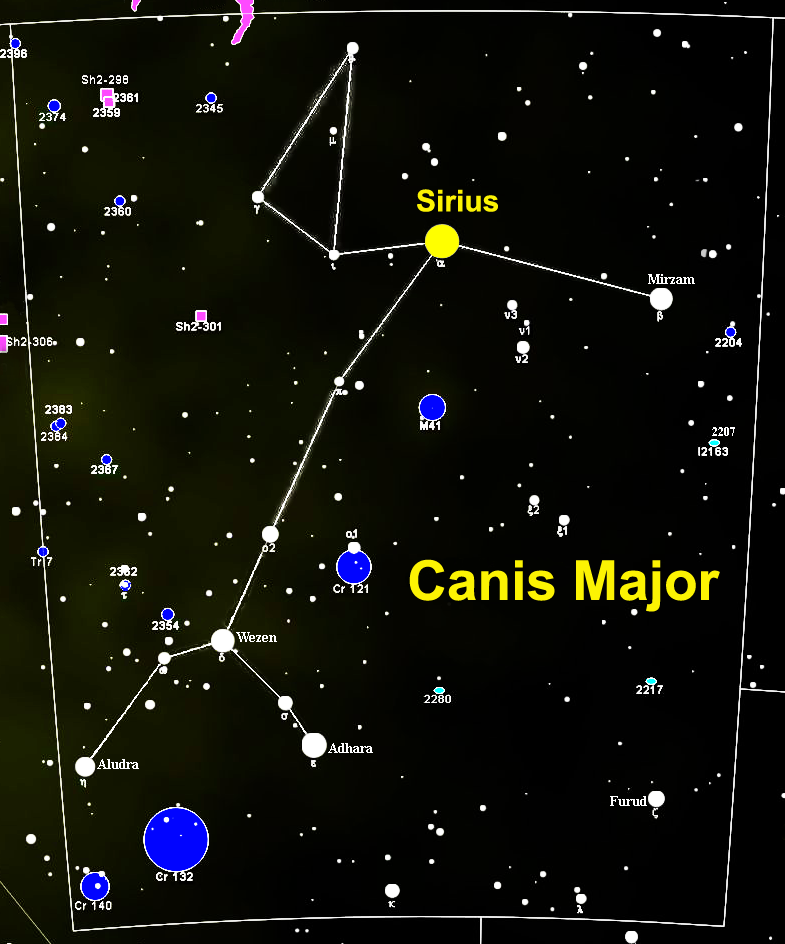
Canis Major with Sirius

The Oxford English Dictionary states that the word 'dogwatch' is a direct translation from either German or Dutch of a similar term. It originally referred to the night-watch on ships—that is, the time when (on land) all but the dogs were asleep. The name is also said to be derived from Sirius, the "Dog Star", on the claim that Sirius was the first star that can be seen at night. An alternative folk etymology is that the name arose because someone tasked with one of these 'half' watches was said to be 'dodging the watch', taking or standing the 'dodge watch'. This became shortened to 'dog watch'. Another variation is that those sleeping get only 'dog sleep' in this watch. Stephen Maturin of Patrick O'Brian's Aubrey–Maturin series retells the 19th century humourist Theodore Hook's pun that the dog watch is so-named because it is "cur-tailed" ("curtailed", i.e. shortened).

== Traditional watch system ==
A 2-section dogged watch
Name	Time	Day 1	Day 2	Day 3
First watch	2000–0000	Team 1	Team 2	Team 1
Middle watch	0000–0400	Team 2	Team 1	Team 2
Morning watch	0400–0800	Team 1	Team 2	Team 1
Forenoon watch	0800–1200	Team 2	Team 1	Team 2
Afternoon watch	1200–1600	Team 1	Team 2	Team 1
First dog watch	1600–1800	Team 2	Team 1	Team 2
Last dog watch	1800–2000	Team 1	Team 2	Team 1

The traditional watch system arose from sailing ships of the late 19th century and was used by the Royal Navy and many other Commonwealth navies. It consisted of 5 four-hour periods and 2 two-hour periods. Those members of the crew whose work must be done at all times of the day were assigned to one of two divisions: the starboard or the port division. These can be further divided into two parts, e.g., First Port, Second Starboard.

The Royal Navy traditional submarine three watch system is 2 on 4 off during the day (8 a.m. to 8 p.m.) and 3 on 6 off during the night (8 p.m. to 8 a.m.).

== See also ==
- Ship's bell
- Watch system
