= Montenegro (novel) =

1997 novel by Starling Lawrence

- Author: Starling Lawrence
- Published: 1997
- Publisher: Farrar Straus Giroux publishers
- Media type: print
- Pages: 320

Montenegro is a novel by the American writer Starling Lawrence. The book was first published in 1997 by Farrar Straus and Giroux publishers. The novel is set in the mountains of Balkans of Montenegro. This was the author's first novel.

== Reviews ==
Publishers weekly in their review called it "a dashing novel set in the rocky heart of the Balkans at the turn of the century, but with emotions and political fervor that uncannily foreshadow the present-day Bosnian quagmire." The Los Angeles Times called it a "a subtle and moving novel, an old-fashioned narrative that addresses modern questions of ethnicity and belonging."
