= The Road to Samarcand =

1954 novel by Patrick O'Brian

- First edition
- Author: Patrick O'Brian
- Cover artist: Ralph Thompson
- Language: English
- Genre: Adventure novel
- Publisher: Rupert Hart-Davis
- Publication date: 1955
- Publication place: United Kingdom
- Media type: Print hardback
- Pages: 255
- ISBN: 0-393-06473-5 W. W. Norton 2007 edition
- OCLC: 85444341

The Road to Samarcand is a novel by English author Patrick O'Brian, published in 1954 and set in Asia during the 1930s. Derrick, an American teen, is brought to China with his missionary parents, then orphaned. He goes to sea with his uncle Captain Sullivan and Ross, the Captain's friend, starting out on the South China Sea. They are the core of a group who has adventures on the road to Samarcand, using skills as required by the challenges of the journey, often for the first time in their lives. They begin on the oldest ways of transportation and end on the newest.

One reviewer in 2007 writes about the novel: "Six decades later, O'Brian's richly told adventure saga, with its muscular prose, supple dialogue and engaging characters, packs a nice old-school punch." The Road to Samarcand precedes by 15 years the first novel of the Aubrey-Maturin series, the canon which brought O'Brian fame, and bears a relationship to its development.

== Plot introduction ==
Derrick is an American teenager who came to China with his missionary parents. He was orphaned and taken under his uncle's care aboard the sailing ship The Wanderer. Derrick is at the wheel of the sailing ship in the South China Sea. The boy's uncle, Captain Sullivan of the Asian Pacific shipping trade, feels the time has come to prepare Derrick for his future. He, his companion Ross and Derrick's older cousin, all believe that the youth must now leave the ship and attend school in England. This cousin, Professor Ayrton, is en route to China from England. He is an elderly, highly educated man and an expert in oriental archaeology. Derrick is unhappy with the prospect of leaving the ship, and Professor Ayrton proposes "to gild the pill of education" by taking the youth back to England via the famous road to Samarcand.

== Plot summary ==
The story begins during a voyage on the South China Sea, where almost at once Derrick's ship encounters a typhoon. Surviving this perilous experience, the ship under Captain Sullivan reaches shore and completes the rendezvous with Professor Ayrton. The party is equipped for the journey to the road to Samarcand. Members of the party include his relatives, Cousin Ayrton and Uncle Sullivan; Derrick, himself; Sullivan's intrepid companion, Ross; the ship's Chinese cook, Li Han; and one of Captain Sullivan's seamen, Olaf Svenssen. Horses and Mongolian guides are engaged: Derrick becomes a skilled horseman and learns to speak Mongolian. The party follows a circuitous route to the road to Samarcand to travel in safety and to satisfy Professor Ayrton's archaeological wishes. This circuitous route sends the band to areas that reveal interesting aspects of the Chinese, Mongolian and Tibetan cultures.

Some adventures are fruitful but not dangerous, as when Derrick and his Mongolian companion ride out to hunt with a falcon and when the Professor acquires jade treasure; some involve danger. The latter includes imprisonment, escape, brushes with revolutionaries and bandits, and hand-to-hand fighting. The party becomes involved in deadly skirmishes at a time in history when the old skills of warfare are bowing to superior firepower. As this state-of-affairs turns dramatic, Professor Ayrton is forced to pass himself off as a Russian Army officer who specialises in armament. He is anything but an expert and does not know how to fire a gun when the expedition begins.

Other adventures involve dangers crossing a glacier where the party must face both blizzard conditions and inimical monks masquerading as yeti, and the loss and eventual rediscovery of party-members Ross, Li Han and Olaf. As the final adventure, the little group escapes disaster in a functioning helicopter, which has been abandoned near the monastery where the band has been virtually imprisoned. There is spare gasoline in a can, and the party is flown away by Ross. He is completely inexperienced as a helicopter pilot; Ross has mechanical prowess and is the only party member who succeeds in starting the engine. Ross is brave and has a history as the captain of a ship at sea. Airborne and finally out of danger, the party sees below on the ground their goal, the road to Samarcand.

== Characters ==
- Derrick: American teen brought to China by missionary parents, now under his uncle's care, as he is orphaned.
- Captain Sullivan: Uncle of Derrick and captain of merchant sailing ship, The Wanderer.
- Ross: Companion to Captain Sullivan. He is a brave man with strong mechanical skills.
- Li Han: Cook on the sailing ship The Wanderer.
- Professor Ayrton: Expert in oriental archeology, and much older cousin to Derrick
- Olaf Svenssen: Seaman aboard the sailing ship The Wanderer.

== Reviews ==
While structured with plot and subplots, and created with a cast of interesting characters, the novel draws its major appeal from O'Brian's great story-telling ability. The product of this ability can be seen as a series of adventures in exotic locales, the type of material designed to resonate in the imagination of a typical teenaged boy. There are neither female characters nor romance in The Road to Samarcand. Publishers Weekly remarks that "Earthy, sly humor keeps the action set pieces perking along: frigid temperatures, militaristic Tibetan monks and even the Abominable Snowman await. Six decades later, O'Brian's richly told adventure saga, with its muscular prose, supple dialogue and engaging characters, packs a nice old-school punch."

== Earlier short stories ==
Writing under his birth name, P. R. Russ, Patrick O'Brian published three stories in the Oxford Annual for Boys which involve Sullivan and Ross. They are "Noughts and Crosses" (1936), "Two's Company" (1937) and "No Pirates Nowadays" (1940). Although he had appeared in print previously, O'Brian had not created a relationship between men of an equal footing before "Noughts and Crosses," as he does with Sullivan and Ross. His biographer Dean King describes this as a "watershed" event. Fourteen years elapsed between the publications of "No Pirates Nowadays" and The Road to Samarcand. Despite the length of time, the short story may be considered the "prequel" to the novel. It opens with the same characters aboard the same ship in the same general locale that existed at the conclusion of the short story. O'Brian would continue writing in the style of the prequel and would maintain his target of adolescent males when he expanded his format to novel form in The Road to Samarcand.

== Allusions to history and technology ==
O'Brian skirted anachronism in creating this manner of escape, a helicopter. Although the technology was available in the late 1930s, existing helicopters were limited to scarce prototypes, and actual aircraft were not produced in large numbers until the 1940s.

The road to Samarcand is a route better known today as the Silk Road.

== Relationship to Aubrey-Maturin series ==
The Road to Samaracand foreshadows aspects of O'Brian's masterpiece, the Aubrey-Maturin series. Although the story takes place largely on land, like the novels in the nautical series, The Road to Samarcand begins with an adventure at sea. The ship and its crew are challenged to survive a typhoon. Described in a gripping manner, like the storms at sea in the Aubrey-Maturin series, O'Brian's writing of this storm sequence displays a mastery comparable with that of Joseph Conrad.

Both Captain Sullivan and Professor Ayrton demonstrate traits and practices which may be seen later in Jack Aubrey and Stephen Maturin. On first look, the personalities of Captain Sullivan and Captain Aubrey are dissimilar; however, a likeness can be drawn between them. For example, Captain Sullivan exhibits superior courage, sailing and fighting abilities, as does Captain Aubrey. Sullivan travels with a particular friend, Ross, just as Aubrey almost always travels with Maturin. The significance of this similarity, the bond between the pairs of men, its development and role in the story line, is emphasised in the words of Patrick O'Brian: "The essence of my books is about human relationships and how people treat one another."

Readers of the Aubrey-Maturin series are familiar with Jack Aubrey's resort to his violin. Captain Sullivan also plays the violin. Jack Aubrey eventually becomes the owner of his beloved ship, the Surprise. So, Captain Sullivan owns the Wanderer. Both ships are outdated: the Surprise is no longer large enough or sufficiently armed to compete in combat with contemporary navy vessels, and the Wanderer is being superseded by steam-powered ships.

Certain qualities of Professor Ayrton are found in an extreme degree in Stephen Maturin. Both men are learned and well regarded in their specific fields and in general erudition. Despite high learning, both men encounter practical difficulties. Maturin, for example, is known inveterately to fall or bark his shins when attempting to cross between boats unaided, and in The Far Side of the World he even falls out of the ship in the middle of the Pacific Ocean when attempting to net specimens in the sea. In the process he becomes amazingly tangled in his net, and Jack Aubrey must dive in to rescue him. In the same incompetent manner, Professor Ayrton accidentally discharges his rifle as his small group stealthily prepares to spring an ambush, stating lamely, "It went off," though the character Maturin is an accurate shot in duels and knows his weapons. In another incident more reminiscent of Stephen Maturin, the professor misplaces an important map in his robes, and it is discovered that the map has gravitated to a different area of the garment, and he has been sitting upon it. Continuing the aforementioned incident from The Far Side of the World, Maturin's use of the South Pacific term,"taboo," nearly the extent of his linguistic knowledge of any Polynesian language, preserves Aubrey from castration at the hands of a crew of solely female mariners aboard their craft. This powerful incident is the remolding of an earlier passage in The Road to Samarcand, when Professor Ayrton is forced to extend himself in an unfamiliar language to mislead a company of dominant Tibetan females. They have chosen Olaf from Captain Sullivan's company as a bridegoom, but Professor Ayrton is able to convince them the Swede is not only mad, but subject to supernatural influences.

There are further similarities between The Road to Samarcand and the Aubrey-Maturin series, though perhaps less important. In a singular instance, Captain Sullivan refers to "a very strong-minded woman, not at all unlike a Mrs. Williams..." This is an amazingly apt description of Jack Aubrey's mother-in-law. Mrs Williams appears in a number of novels in the Aubrey-Maturin series and occasionally influences the story line. The Road to Samarcand and Aubrey-Maturin series can also be compared with respect to O'Brian's inclusion of animals. The certain horses associated with Mongols are described, as are one- and two-humped camels, and there are numerous references to yaks. The frequent mention of tiger-sharks and albatrosses in the nautical series echoes incidents aboard the Wanderer. Finally, the relationship between Derrick and the dog he discovers, rescues and names Chang, is thoughtfully developed in the same way that human/animal relationships with dogs, cats and horses are developed throughout the Aubrey-Maturin series.

O'Brian's use of humour, very present in the later canon, is also an ingredient of The Road to Samarcand. A notable example is Professor Ayrton's attempts to use American slang. Typically, he has prepared for his meeting with Derrick by studying the subject in a book. His scholarly training, however, causes him to apply grammatical rules to a subject that defies grammar. Also present throughout the novel is a more gentle humour furnished by Li Han.

When the reader meets Jagiello, a Lithuanian in the Swedish army, in the seventh book of the Aubrey-Maturin series, O'Brian's "subtle and light touch with dialect" was well developed. Twenty-four years earlier in The Road to Samarcand it can be seen as still developing when he composes Olaf Svenssen's accented English. By contrast, the author's "fine ear for dialogue" shows well in the stylised speeches of Li Han.

== Bibliography ==
- O'Brian, Patrick (2007) [1954]. The Road to Samarcand. New York: W. W. Norton & Company. ISBN 978-0-393-06473-5.
- King, Dean (2000). Patrick O'Brian:A life revealed. London: Hodder & Stoughton. ISBN 978-0-340-79255-1.
