= The Golden Ocean =

1956 novel by Patrick O'Brian

- First edition
- Author: Patrick O'Brian
- Language: English
- Genre: Historical novel
- Publisher: Rupert Hart-Davis
- Publication date: 1956
- Publication place: United Kingdom
- Pages: 288
- OCLC: 30111434
- Followed by: The Unknown Shore

The Golden Ocean is a 1956 historical novel by Patrick O'Brian. It tells the story of a novice midshipman, Peter Palafox, who joins George Anson's voyage around the world beginning in 1740. Palafox is a Protestant Irish boy from the west coast of Ireland, schooled by his father, a churchman, and eager to join the Royal Navy. He learns naval discipline and how to determine his ship's position at sea as part of a large berth of midshipmen on HMS Centurion. His friend Sean O'Mara joins with him, considered his servant initially by officers and put among the seamen, rising in rank as he shows his abilities, to bosun's mate.

The book contains a wealth of period detail, and includes historical figures, like Anson, the midshipman Keppel, Mr Walter, the chaplain to Anson and kind guide and keeper of the purse for Peter Palafox, and captains of other vessels in the squadron.

Reviews in 1994 found it not a mature work from the author, but showing signs of "the Conradian force that shows where O'Brian was headed as a narrative writer." Another reviewer felt this novel showed nearly "all the naval lore and sense of place that grace the Aubrey/Maturin books". Two reviewers felt that all readers "will be swept up by the richness of O'Brian's prodigious imagination", and it was "A humorous adventure for all collections."

== Plot ==
In Spring 1740, Peter Palafox, the son of a poor Irish Protestant clergyman, is appointed midshipman aboard HMS Centurion, through the influence of Mr Walter, a Royal Naval chaplain on the same ship and an old friend of his father. Peter is joined by his friend Sean O'Mara, the son of his nurse, and by Peregrine FitzGerald, a fashionable young man of similar age.

Reporting at Spithead, Peter and FitzGerald are assigned to the midshipmen’s berth, while Sean is accepted as a common seaman. Peter learns he was expected to have brought his own sea chest, navigation instruments, and uniform – none of which he can possibly afford. Fortunately, Mr Walter realises that the stone Peter wears at his throat is a valuable emerald, and arranges for its sale.

Centurion is the flagship of Commodore Anson’s squadron (comprising Centurion, Gloucester, Severn, Pearl, Wager, Tryal, Anna, and Industry) that has been tasked by the Admiralty with sailing to the Pacific (the 'Golden Ocean’) to attack Spanish shipping off Patagonia and attempt the capture of the Acapulco Galleon, a hugely rich Spanish treasure ship. Anson learns from Peter that his supposedly secret mission is widely known on the Irish coast, and that the Spanish have dispatched a fleet under Pizarro in response.

Peter gradually adapts to naval discipline, despite being insulted as 'Teague' by his fellow midshipmen. FitzGerald, unsuited to sea life, leaves the ship at Madeira. Peter is supported in his studies by Eliott (navigation), Ransome (seamanship), and Keppel (morale). Fever claims many crew members during the Atlantic crossing; Peter falls ill but recovers during a stop at St Catherine's Island, Brazil.

The rounding of Cape Horn – a passage rarely achieved by English sailors – consists of an unimaginably difficult thirty-eight days of storms, mountainous seas, currents, fogs and bitter cold, all to be dealt with while the crews are ravaged by scurvy. Elliot and many others die, and several ships are lost. Pizarro's fleet is sighted. After mistakenly believing themselves clear of danger at last, the survivors find themselves hard against the rocky Patagonian shore. Not all make it, and only Centurion, Gloucester, Tryal, and Anna reach the safety of Juan Fernandez. Peter records that of 961 men who set sail in those ships, 626 have died. The crews of Wager, Severn, and Pearl are also presumed lost. Peter marks his second birthday as a midshipman; Sean has been promoted to captain of the foretop.

The reduced squadron sails North into Spanish waters. A Spanish merchant ship is captured by the damaged Tryal and takes her place. Crews seize treasure from the city of Paita, and the squadron positions itself to intercept the Acapulco Galleon. However, forewarned, the galleon does not sail. Following orders to circumnavigate the globe, Anson heads across the Pacific. The storm-damaged Gloucester is burned at sea, and her crew taken aboard Centurion. Scurvy strikes again, killing many more.

In September 1742, Centurion reaches the small island of Tinian, where Anson and a number of his crew land. An unexpected gale blows the Centurion out to sea. Fearing her lost, Anson makes fevered preparations to sail to China in a modified Spanish bark, but the Centurion survives, and her remaining crew are able to sail her back to rejoin Anson three weeks later. At Macao in China the ship is repaired. Mr Walter and several officers depart on a merchant vessel bound for England.

As Centurion heads home, Anson announces a final attempt to intercept the Acapulco Galleon before it reaches Manila. On 20 June 1743, Centurion engages the galleon in a two-and-a-half-hour battle and forces her surrender. The prize contains 1,313,843 pieces of eight and 35,682 ounces of silver and plate.

Sean is promoted to bosun’s mate, responsible for guarding the treasure during the homeward voyage. After recruiting experienced Dutch seamen at Cape Town, the return is swift. Peter and Sean are paid their shares, and Peter gives his father £1,000, lifting the family from genteel poverty.

== Principal characters ==
- Peter Palafox: Son of an Irish Protestant clergyman. He was raised in Ballynasaggart in Connaught on the coast, very poor but well educated.
- Sean O'Mara: Peter's friend, the son of his nurse.
- Mr Walter: Chaplain on Centurian. He is modelled on a real person, Chaplain to Commodore Anson.
- Peregrine FitzGerald: Midshipman who joins with Peter; about his age, with a strong sense of honour and offence.
- Commodore Anson: Leads the squadron.
- Mr Keppel: Cheerful and capable midshipman who has been at sea since the age of 10. Based on a real person who later rose to high naval office.
- Mr Ransome: A capable older seaman who has been promoted to midshipman.
- Mr Elliot: Midshipman with real skill in mathematics and navigation.
- Mr Saunders: First lieutenant of the Centurion.
- Mr Pascoe Thomas: Schoolmaster to the midshipman.
- Mr Blew: Master of the Centurion, who teaches navigation to the midshipmen.
- Mr Saumarez: First lieutenant aboard Centurion, He is based on a real person in the Royal Navy.

== Ships ==
Anson's squadron

- HMS Centurion: fourth-rate: 60 guns, the flagship
- HMS Gloucester: 50 guns
- HMS Severn: 50 guns
- HMS Pearl: 40 guns
- HMS Wager: 28 guns
- HMS Tryal: sloop of war
- Anna and Industry: the victuallers, chartered pinks.

Spanish

- Manila Galleon Nuestra Señora de la Cobadonga: 42 guns, 550 men

== Reviews ==
Reviews collected were written in 1994 when W W Norton republished the 1956 novel, and more than half of the Aubrey-Maturin series novels had been published. Reviewers viewed the novel as it stood and in contrast to the author's later level of accomplishments in that series.

Publishers Weekly, writing in 1994, says this first sea novel by O'Brian "can stand on its own as an entertaining and psychologically astute narrative". They see in this 1956 novel "practically all the naval lore and sense of place that grace the Aubrey/Maturin books". Specifically, "Shipboard life rings true, the story never flags and humor abounds: "Well, he is a wonderful poacher for a Protestant," observes one Anglo-Irishman.

Kirkus Reviews finds this novel "Not a mature piece of work, but appealing enough to satisfy fans of O'Brian's naval sagas."

Tom Clark writing in the Los Angeles Times says that "evidently in keeping with an aim of appealing to a younger audience, the darker aspects of the crew's experience are played down in favor of a robust and exhilarating rendering of the great adventure of it all." It is a first sea novel with a young boy as the main character, but "if there's any character in The Golden Ocean with heavyweight potential, it's the sea itself, whose power as a kind of fate is rendered with the Conradian force that shows where O'Brian was headed as a narrative writer." Clark notes that "At least two of those accounts, those of Anson's chaplain, Richard Walter, and of a young Irish midshipman, John Philips, appear to have supplied O'Brian much of what he needed to paint with charming pictorial realism the life both above and below decks on Anson's flagship Centurion."

Library Journal noted that this book by O'Brian "set the course they [Aubrey-Maturin series] later followed." It is recommended for all ages: "A humorous adventure for all collections."

Scott Veale writing in The New York Times was upbeat about this novel, saying that "As always, the author's erudition and humor are on display, whether he's describing the singing of the masts in the wind, the harrowing seas of Cape Horn or 18th-century superstitions." Veale found the period detail to be "uncompromising", and expected that readers "will be swept up by the richness of O'Brian's prodigious imagination."

== Background ==
The same expedition is described from the perspective of two on one of the ships in the squadron that did not make it around the globe in O'Brian's The Unknown Shore. It focusses on the ship HMS Wager and different main characters, including John Byron, then a midshipman, age 18. Mr Walter the chaplain wrote his own account of the voyage of Anson, noted by Clark (above) as one of O'Brian's historical sources for this novel and the interactions among the officers and crew. An original copy was at auction in 2009.

In 1969, O'Brian published Master and Commander, the first book in a 20 novel series, known as the Aubrey-Maturin series.

== Allusions to history and real places ==
The story is based on a real event, George Anson's voyage around the world that began in 1740. Places named in Ireland, England, Madeira, the Pacific coast of South America, Manila, Macau and Canton in China are real, including St. Catherine's Island off Brazil at 24 degrees South latitude, shown on the map opening this book by H W Household.

A map of the world with George Anson’s real four year voyage around the world from 1740 to 1744 shows the route taken.

Path of the Centurion under the command of George Anson, with place names of that era

The Spanish galleon Nuestra Señora de la Covadonga, after the battle, was sold at Macau and the treasure transferred to Centurion, which proceeded to England after a brief rest, arriving there in June 1744.

== Publication history ==
Rupert Hart-Davis published many of O'Brian's works, including translations (e.g., Papillon and Banco: The Further Advancement of Papillon in 1970 and 1973), The Road to Samarcand, The Golden Ocean, The Unknown Shore and short stories from 1953 to 1974. In 1994, The Golden Ocean was re-issued by HarperCollins in the UK and W W Norton in the US.
