= Richard Temple (novel) =

1962 novel by Patrick O'Brian

- First edition (UK)
- Author: Patrick O'Brian
- Language: English
- Genre: Historical fiction
- Publisher: Collins (UK); Norton (US)
- Publication date: 1962
- Publication place: United Kingdom
- Media type: Print (Hardback & Paperback) & Audio Book (Cassette, CD)
- Pages: 256 pp (UK) & 335 pp (US)
- OCLC: 62421217

Richard Temple is a 1962 novel by Patrick O'Brian, told in flashback as Temple, a British agent, lies in a Gestapo cell in occupied France. After prolonged torture, the protagonist examines his past life as a painter in London in the 1930s, and describes his early erotic encounters. The novel contains many details of the author's youthful life.

The joy Temple feels when he realises that the Gestapo have accepted pseudo-Temple as the truth, and that he is therefore safe, is the converse of O’Brian’s agony when journalists, late in his life, broke down his own cover story.

— William Waldegrave

== Bibliography ==
- Richard Temple, London: Macmillan, 1962;
- Richard Temple, New York: W.W. Norton & Co., 2006, ISBN 978-0-393-06187-1
