= The Unknown Shore =

1959 novel by Patrick O'Brian

- First edition (UK)
- Author: Patrick O'Brian
- Language: English
- Genre: Historical novel
- Publisher: Rupert Hart-Davis (UK) & W.W. Norton (USA)
- Publication date: 1959
- Publication place: United Kingdom
- Media type: Print (Hardback & Paperback)
- Pages: 320 paperback
- ISBN: 978-0-393-31538-7 W. W. Norton paperback edition 1996
- OCLC: 43224687
- Preceded by: The Golden Ocean

The Unknown Shore is a historical novel published in 1959 by Patrick O'Brian. It is the story of two friends, Jack Byron and Tobias Barrow, who sail aboard HMS Wager as part of the voyage around the world led by Commodore George Anson in 1740. Their ship did not make it all the way around the world, unlike the flagship. The novel is a fictionalised version of actual events which occurred during the Wager mutiny.

Some reviewers feel that the midshipman Byron and the somewhat unworldly surgeon's mate Barrow are prototypes for Jack Aubrey and Stephen Maturin, the central protagonists of O'Brian's subsequent Aubrey–Maturin series set during the Napoleonic Wars.

== Plot summary ==
In the early part of the novel, set in London, other members of the expedition are featured. They appear in more detail in The Golden Ocean, another O'Brian novel about the Anson expedition, published in 1956.

The expedition is beset by storms while rounding Cape Horn, and the Wager is shipwrecked off the coast of Chile when her position cannot be determined. After the wreck, the crew rejects the authority of their officers and leaves the captain, some officers, and some other crew on the island (now known as Wager Island) while they sail away in a boat built from the wreck. The marooned officers make their way to a Spanish settlement with the help of the native people. The novel is based on the accounts of actual survivors. Survivors from the lower deck made their way back to Britain long before the officers. The novel describes the crew members asserting that the officers had no authority over them, once their ship was wrecked.

== Characters in The Unknown Shore ==
- Jack Byron – midshipman aboard HMS Wager and the chief protagonist
- Tobias Barrow – Jack's friend

== Allusions to real events ==
The Wager's crew did reject the authority of their officers, once the ship was wrecked, in what became known as the Wager mutiny in 1741. The lesson of the wreck of the Wager played a role in revising British naval discipline, so that officers did retain formal authority over crew members even when their ships were lost or captured.

== Allusions to real persons ==
John "Jack" Byron was an historical person and the basic facts of the story are true. He went on to a distinguished naval career, rising to the rank of vice-admiral. There is an "easter egg" that O'Brian includes in the novel: his version of Jack Byron secretly writes poetry, and wants Tobias to refrain from mentioning it to any of his peers. This is perhaps an allusion to the fact that the famous poet Lord Byron was one of John Byron's grandsons.

== See also ==
- The Golden Ocean – another work by Patrick O'Brian, whose two protagonists are young men aboard one of the other vessels on the same expedition as the Wager
