= Geoff Hunt (marine artist) =

English painter

Geoff Hunt PPRSMA (born 1948) is a British maritime artist and former President of the Royal Society of Marine Artists.

== Biography ==
"Tormented Giant" by Geoff Hunt, showing the style of nautical art of this artist

Geoff Hunt is a leading figure in marine art. According to Artist Partners Ltd he is ‘one of the world’s finest painters of 18th and 19th century ships.’ Hunt is perhaps best known in popular perception for his depictions of naval scenes adorning the covers of Patrick O’Brian’s bestselling ‘Aubrey-Maturin’ novels, a connection he began in 1988. He also has painted scenes from C.S. Forester's Horatio Hornblower series and Julian Stockwin's Thomas Kydd series. As William Delmont notes, ‘Though he was a renowned book cover artist before his partnership with O’Brian, Hunt’s work gained more widespread commercial success through the novels.’ In a 2008 interview with Artist & Illustrators magazine, Hunt asserted ‘I find ships awesome, fascinating, and slightly frightening.’

Hunt attended Kingston and Epsom Schools of Art, 1966–70, where he studied graphic design. Upon graduation, following a couple of years in advertising, Hunt established himself as a freelance artist and designer. Hunt was Art Editor for the popular Warship quarterly journal, from its inception in 1977 until 1979.

In addition to his illustrative work, Hunt has forged a successful career exhibiting across the globe. He is a Past-President of the Royal Society of Marine Artists. Whilst he continues to paint historic scenes, Hunt also depicts contemporary pleasure yachts, warships and other vessels.

A wide selection of his work can be found in The Marine Art of Geoff Hunt (2004), published by Conway Publishing. Warships International Fleet Review found it ‘Spectacular and highly recommended.’ Famed for his attention to minute detail, Hunt once contacted ‘the Royal Observatory for the altitude and azimuth of the sun at a certain latitude and longitude at an exact moment in history’ to maintain the historical accuracy of one of his pieces.

In February 2007, Hunt was asked by Rear-Admiral John Lippiett, Chief Executive of the Mary Rose Trust to paint an artist’s reconstruction of Henry VIII’s infamous flagship. Hunt accepted the commission, finally completing the painting in January 2009 after hours of extensive and meticulous research. An article by Hunt recounting the experience can be found in the Shipwright 2010 annual.

Hunt’s illustrations adorn The Frigate Surprise: The Design, Construction and Careers of Jack Aubrey’s Favourite Command (2008), which he co-authored with respected maritime historian, Brian Lavery. Aubrey’s creator Patrick O’Brian has proclaimed that ‘Geoff Hunt’s pictures, perfectly accurate in period and detail, but very far from merely representational, are often suffused with a light reminiscent of Canaletto.’

Hunt lives in Wimbledon with his wife and two children. Befitting his muse, Hunt’s studio is situated on the site of Merton Place, Admiral Nelson’s house.

== Exhibitions and collections ==
Hunt has exhibited at:

- The Mall Galleries, London SW1
- The Royal Naval Museum, Portsmouth
- The Mystic Maritime Gallery, Mystic
- The Solent Gallery, Lymington
- The John Stobart Gallery, Boston
- Hanover Square Gallery, New York
- The Russell Jinishian Gallery, Fairfield CT
- The Annapolis Marine Art Gallery, Annapolis MD
- The Gallery Americana, Carmel, California (7)

Some of Hunt’s notable print and painting collections:

- The Nelson Collection
- Speed Under Sail
- Hornblower’s Ships
- The Kydd Collection
- Fighting Sail 1773–1815
- The Mary Rose
- The American Series

== Bibliography ==
- The Frigate Surprise: The Design, Construction and Careers of Jack Aubrey’s Favourite Command, with Brian Lavery, Conway Publishing (2008)
- The Marine Art of Geoff Hunt: Master Painter of the Naval World of Nelson and Patrick O’Brian, Conway Publishing (2004) ISBN 978-0-85177-971-3
- The Tall Ship in Art: Roy Cross, Derek Gardner, John Groves, Geoff Hunt, Mark Myers, with Cross, Gardner, Groves and Myers, Cassell Illustrated/Blandford Press (1999)
- The Wapping Group of Artists, Seafarer Books/Sheridan House (2005) ISBN 0-9547062-5-0 (compiler & co-author)
- Introduction to A Celebration of Marine Art: Sixty Years of the Royal Society of Marine Artists, Bounty Books (2005) ISBN 0-7537-1139-7
- Designer for Seamanship in the Age of Sail, John H. Harland and Mark Myers (1984)
- Art Editor for Warship, Conway Maritime Press (1977–79)
- Jacket Illustrations for Patrick O’Brian’s ‘Aubrey-Maturin’ novels
- Jacket Illustration for Julian Stockwin’s ‘Kydd’ series of naval novels
- Jacket Illustration for Sam Willis, Fighting Ships 1750–1850, Quercus Publishing Plc (2007) ISBN 1-84724-171-9
- Jacket Illustration for Brian Lavery, Nelson’s Navy: The Ships, Men and Organisation, 1793–1815, Conway Maritime Press (1989) ISBN 0-85177-521-7
