= Starling Lawrence =

American book editor (1943–2025)

- Born: March 11, 1943; Manhattan, New York
- Died: August 21, 2025 (aged 82); Manhattan, New York
- Occupation: Editor for W. W. Norton & Company
- Notable work: Montenegro
- Spouses: Virginia Hornblower (divorced); Linda Corrente (m. 1984; died 1999); Jenny Preston (m. 2005)

Starling Ransome Lawrence (March 11, 1943 – August 21, 2025) was an American editor who spent 55 years with the book publisher W. W. Norton & Company.

== Early life ==
Starling Ransome Lawrence was born on March 11, 1943, in Manhattan, New York, to investment counselor James F. Lawrence and Barbara Lawrence. His mother was a trustee of the Foxcroft School in Virginia and a board member for the Tanglewood Music Festival in Massachusetts. Lawrence spent most of his summers and weekends on the Norfolk, Connecticut, estate of his maternal great-grandfather, Charles A. Coffin, the founder of General Electric.

Lawrence attended Malvern College in England and Phillips Exeter Academy in New Hampshire and graduated with a bachelor's degree in English from Princeton University in 1965. Upon graduating, he served with his first wife, Virginia Hornblower in the Peace Corps in Cameroon. After finishing that work, he earned a master's degree from Pembroke College, Oxford, in 1967.

== Career ==
In 1969, editor Evan Welling Thomas II invited Lawrence to join W. W. Norton & Company as an assistant editor, which paid $1300 per year ($11,413 in 2025). Lawrence was promoted to executive editor of the trade department in 1989, editor-in-chief in 1993, and vice chairman in 2000. Lawrence's detailed criticism was widely praised by authors under his oversight, and he was particularly critical of sexist tropes.

Lawrence was known for recognizing the potential of overlooked manuscripts, purchasing the rights to Michael Lewis' Liar's Poker and Sebastian Junger's The Perfect Storm when neither author was able to secure offers elsewhere. Lawrence decided to sign Junger after reading an Outside magazine article written by the latter. Economist Burton Malkiel has credited Lawrence's editorial oversight with making his 1973 book, A Random Walk Down Wall Street, understandable to non-economists.

After visiting then-obscure English novelist Patrick O'Brian's agent in London, Lawrence read The Reverse of the Medal on his return journey and convinced Norton to acquire the rights to O'Brian's novels within the United States. This publishing deal helped popularize Master and Commander, which was ultimately adapted into the 2003 film Master and Commander: The Far Side of the World.

As Norton's editor-in-chief, Lawrence's scope expanded to biographies. In a 1998 interview, he advised publishers to carefully control advances, distribution, and promotions in this genre because it rarely produces bestsellers, yet many titles will have sales continue for decades after with reissues to update the contents with newly discovered facts.

In 2011, Lawrence was succeeded as editor-in-chief by John Glusman while remaining an editor-at-large until his death. He explained his decision to step down as driven by his relative inexperience with the industry's shift toward electronic publishing.

Lawrence wrote four books of his own, beginning with Legacies in 1996, an anthology of short stories praised by The New York Times for its complex characters. His second book, Montenegro, was published in 1997. In 2006, he wrote The Lightning Keeper, a novel about the role of electricity during the Industrial Revolution, which reviewers interpreted as inspired by his family's relation to General Electric.

== Personal life ==
Lawrence's first marriage to Virginia Hornblower produced triplet children named Dune, Peter, and Joshua, but it ended in divorce. His next marriage was to editor and graphic designer Linda Corrente in 1984, which ended with her 1999 death. In 2005, he married his first cousin, Jenny Preston.

On August 21, 2025, Lawrence died at NewYork-Presbyterian Hospital in New York City from the complications of a head injury he suffered in April 2025. He was 82.
