= Patrick O'Brian =

English novelist (1914–2000)

Patrick O'Brian CBE
- Born: Richard Patrick Russ; 12 December 1914; Chalfont St Peter, Buckinghamshire, England
- Died: 2 January 2000 (aged 85); Dublin, Ireland
- Resting place: Collioure, France
- Occupations: Novelist and translator
- Spouse(s): Elizabeth Jones (divorced); Mary O'Brian (1945–1998)
- Writing career
- Notable work: Aubrey–Maturin series

Patrick O'Brian (12 December 1914 – 2 January 2000), born Richard Patrick Russ, was an English novelist and translator, best known for his Aubrey–Maturin series. These sea novels are set in the Royal Navy during the Napoleonic Wars and centre on the friendship of the English naval captain Jack Aubrey and the Irish–Catalan physician Stephen Maturin. The 20-novel series, the first of which is Master and Commander, is known for its well-researched and highly detailed portrayal of early 19th-century life, as well as its authentic and evocative language. A partially finished 21st novel in the series was published posthumously containing facing pages of handwriting and typescript.

O'Brian wrote a number of other novels and short stories, most of which were published before he achieved success with the Aubrey–Maturin series. He also translated works from French to English, and wrote biographies of Joseph Banks and Picasso.

His major success as a writer came late in life, when the Aubrey–Maturin series caught the eye of an American publisher. The series drew more readers and favourable reviews when the author was in his seventies. Near the end of his life, and in the same year that he lost his wife, British media revealed details of O'Brian's early life, first marriage, and post-war change of name, causing distress to the very private author and to many of his readers at that time.

== Personal life and privacy ==
=== Childhood, early career and marriages ===
O'Brian was christened as Richard Patrick Russ, in Chalfont St Peter, Buckinghamshire, a son of Charles Russ, an English physician of German descent, and Jessie Russ (née Goddard), an English woman of Irish descent. The eighth of nine children, O'Brian lost his mother at the age of four, and his biographers describe a fairly isolated childhood, limited by poverty, with sporadic schooling, at St Marylebone Grammar School from 1924 to 1926, while living in Putney, and then at Lewes Grammar School, from September 1926 to July 1929, after the family moved to Lewes, East Sussex, but with intervals at home with his father and stepmother Zoe Center.

His literary career began in his childhood, with the publication of his earliest works, including several short stories. The book Hussein, An Entertainment published by Oxford University Press in 1938, and the short-story collection Beasts Royal brought considerable critical praise, especially considering his youth. He published his first novel at age 15, Caesar: The Life Story of a Panda-Leopard, with help from his father.

In 1927 he applied unsuccessfully to enter the Royal Naval College, Dartmouth. In 1934, he underwent a brief period of pilot training with the Royal Air Force, but that was not successful and he left the RAF. Prior to that, his application to join the Royal Navy had been rejected on health grounds. In 1935, he was living in London, where he married his first wife, Elizabeth Jones, in 1936. They had two children. The second was a daughter who suffered from spina bifida, and died in 1942, aged three, in a country village in Sussex. When the child died, O'Brian had already returned to London, where he worked throughout the war.

The details of his employment during the Second World War are murky. He worked as an ambulance driver, and he stated that he worked in intelligence in the Political Intelligence Department (PID). Dean King has said O'Brian was actively involved in intelligence work and perhaps special operations overseas during the war. Indeed, despite his usual extreme reticence about his past, O'Brian wrote in an essay, "Black, Choleric and Married?", included in the book Patrick O'Brian: Critical Appreciations and a Bibliography (1994) that: "Some time after the blitz had died away I joined one of those intelligence organisations that flourished during the War, perpetually changing their initials and competing with one another. Our work had to do with France, and more than that I shall not say, since disclosing methods and stratagems that have deceived the enemy once and that may deceive him again seems to me foolish. After the war we retired to Wales (I say we because my wife and I had driven ambulances and served in intelligence together) where we lived for a while in a high Welsh-speaking valley..." which confirms in first person the intelligence connection, as well as introducing his wife Mary Tolstoy (née Wicksteed) as a co-worker and fellow intelligence operative.

Nikolai Tolstoy, stepson through O'Brian's marriage to Mary, disputes that account, confirming only that O'Brian worked as a volunteer ambulance driver during the Blitz when he met Mary, the separated wife of Russian-born nobleman and lawyer Count Dmitry Tolstoy. They lived together through the latter part of the war and, after both were divorced from their previous spouses, they married in July 1945. The same month he legally changed his name to Patrick O'Brian.

=== Sailing experience ===
As background to his later sea-going novels, O'Brian did claim to have had limited experience on a square-rigged sailing vessel, as described within his previously-quoted 1994 essay:

The disease that racked my bosom every now and then did not much affect my strength and when it left me in peace (for there were long remissions) sea-air and sea-voyages were recommended. An uncle had a two-ton sloop and several friends had boats, which was fine, but what was even better was that my particular friend Edward, who shared a tutor with me, had a cousin who possessed an ocean-going yacht, a converted square-rigged merchantman, that he used to crew with undergraduates and fair-sized boys, together with some real seamen, and sail far off into the Atlantic. The young are wonderfully resilient, and although I never became much of a topman, after a while I could hand, reef and steer without disgrace, which allowed more ambitious sailoring later on.

Venture capitalist Thomas Perkins found O'Brian lacked practical knowledge when it came to sailing Perkins' superyacht in 1995.

=== Life after the Second World War ===
Between 1946 and 1949 the O'Brians lived in Cwm Croesor, a remote valley in north Wales, where they initially rented a cottage from the architect Clough Williams-Ellis. O'Brian pursued his interest in natural history; he fished, went birdwatching, and followed the local hunt. During this time they lived on Mary O'Brian's small income and the limited earnings from O'Brian's writings.

In 1949 O'Brian and Mary moved to Collioure, a Catalan town in southern France. He and Mary remained together in Collioure until her death in 1998. Mary's love and support were critical to O'Brian throughout his career. She worked with him in the British Museum Library in the 1940s as he collected source material for his anthology A Book of Voyages, which became the first book to bear his new name – the book was among his favourites, because of this close collaboration. The death of his wife in March 1998 was a tremendous blow to O'Brian. In the last two years of his life, particularly once the details of his early life were revealed to the world, he was a "lonely, tortured, and at the last possibly paranoid figure."

=== Media exposure and controversy in his final years ===
O'Brian protected his privacy fiercely and was usually reluctant to reveal any details about his private life or past, preferring to include no biographical details on his book jackets and supplying only a minimum of personal information when pressed to do so. For many years reviewers and journalists presumed he was Irish, and he took no steps to correct the impression. One interviewer, Mark Horowitz, described the man in his late seventies as "a compact, austere gentleman. ... his pale, watchful eyes are clear and alert." He was polite, formal, and erudite in conversation, an erudition that Horowitz said could be intimidating. He learned from those who worked with O'Brian that the erudition did not go unnoticed, while they remained friends.

Richard Ollard, a naval historian, calls this particular habit "blowing people out of the game." Ollard, who edited the early Aubrey–Maturin novels, urged O'Brian to tone down the most obscure allusions, though the books still contain numerous Latin phrases, period medical terminology and specialised naval jargon. "Like many who have struggled themselves", Ollard said of his friend, "he thought others should struggle, too." One longtime acquaintance put it more bluntly: "Patrick can be a bit of a snob, socially and intellectually."

In 1998, a BBC documentary and an exposé in The Daily Telegraph made public the facts of his ancestry, original name and first marriage, provoking considerable critical media comment. In his biography of O'Brian, Nikolai Tolstoy claims to give a more accurate and balanced account of his late stepfather's character, actions and motives, particularly in respect of his first marriage and family.

Horowitz interviewed O'Brian at his home in France in 1994: "Until recently, he refused all interviews. Those authors we know the least about, he says, are the ones we get in their purest form, like Homer. In Clarissa Oakes (published as The Truelove in the US), Stephen warns would-be interviewers that 'question and answer is not a civilised form of conversation.' O'Brian deflects direct inquiries about his private life, and when asked why he moved to the south of France after World War II, he stops and fixes his interrogator with a cold stare. 'That seems to be getting rather close to a personal question,' he says softly, walking on."

John Lanchester in reviewing Tolstoy's book published in 2004, says "The last few years have been disheartening for Patrick O'Brian's many fans." He does not find the arguments altogether persuasive, and with access to documents that Dean King never saw, Tolstoy "gives a portrait of a man who is cold, bullying, isolated, snobbish and super-sensitive." Lanchester closes by saying "Let's agree, we O'Brianists, to read the novels and forget everything else." Veale, in reviewing King's book, says that "however judicious and well-grounded his [King's] speculation, he fails to crack his subject's protective shell. In the end, Aubrey and Maturin will have to thrive on their own—which is how the willfully enigmatic O'Brian most likely intended it."

== Death ==
He continued to work on his naval novels until his death and spent the winter of 1998–1999 at Trinity College Dublin. He died there on 2 January 2000. His body was returned to Collioure, where he is buried next to his wife.

At his death, many obituaries were published evaluating his work, particularly in the Aubrey–Maturin series, and the revelations of his biography prior to his marriage to Mary Wicksteed Tolstoy. Playwright David Mamet wrote an appreciation. His American publisher, W. W. Norton, wrote an appreciation, mentioning their story with O'Brian, how pleased they were the three times he came to the US, in 1993, 1995 and in November 1999 only weeks before his death, and noting sales in the US alone of over three million copies.

The "Amis de Patrick O'Brian" (friends of Patrick O'Brian) association, located in Collioure, was bequeathed O'Brian's desk and various of his writing artefacts and research materials.

== Literary career ==
=== As Patrick Russ ===
O'Brian published two novels, a collection of stories and several uncollected stories under his original name, Richard Patrick Russ. His first novel, Caesar: The Life Story of a Panda-Leopard, was written at the age of 12 and published three years later in 1930. It was a critical success, with a recommendation in the New Statesman and positive reviews in publications including the New York Herald Tribune and the Saturday Review of Literature. Other stories followed, published in boys' magazines and annuals and incorporating themes of natural history and adventure, and a collection of these and other animal stories was published in 1934 under the title Beasts Royal, with illustrations by the noted artist Charles Tunnicliffe, illustrator of Tarka the Otter.

Hussein: An entertainment, set in India, was published in 1938, when O'Brian was 23. It was notable for being the first book of contemporary fiction ever published by the Oxford University Press, to whose annuals for boys he had been a regular contributor for some years. O'Brian published very little under his original name of Russ during World War II, and nothing after 1940. His change of surname in 1945 necessarily meant abandoning the literary reputation he had built up as R P Russ.

=== As Patrick O'Brian ===
O'Brian returned to writing after the war when he moved to rural Wales. His non-fiction anthology A Book of Voyages (1947) attracted little attention. A collection of short stories, The Last Pool, was published in 1950 and was more widely and favourably reviewed, although sales were low. The countryside and people around his village in Wales provided inspiration for many of his short stories of the period, and also his novel Testimonies (1952), which is set in a thinly disguised Cwm Croesor, and which was well received by Delmore Schwartz in Partisan Review in 1952. His next novel was The Catalans, published in 1953. The review in The New York Times noted O'Brian's accomplishments in Testimonies; The Catalans was viewed as a series of well-written scenes by an observant author, but the reviewer did not think it held together as a novel.

In the 1950s, O'Brian wrote three books aimed at a younger age group, The Road to Samarcand, The Golden Ocean, and The Unknown Shore. Although written many years before the Aubrey–Maturin series, the two naval novels reveal literary antecedents of Aubrey and Maturin. In The Golden Ocean and The Unknown Shore, based on events of George Anson's voyage around the world from 1740 to 1744, they can be clearly seen in the characters of Jack Byron and Tobias Barrow in the latter novel.

Over four decades he worked on his own writings, his British literary reputation growing slowly. He became an established translator of French works into English. His early novels and several of the translations were published by Rupert Hart-Davis from 1953 to 1974. O'Brian wrote the first of the Aubrey–Maturin series in 1969 at the suggestion of American publisher J B Lippincott, following the 1966 death of C. S. Forester, a writer of popular nautical novels. The Aubrey–Maturin books were quietly popular in Britain; after the first four volumes, they were not published in the United States.

In the early 1990s, the series was successfully relaunched into the American market by the interest of Starling Lawrence of W. W. Norton & Company, attracting critical acclaim and dramatically increasing O'Brian's sales and public profile in the UK and America. Paul D. Colford notes that when O'Brian "visited the United States a few weeks ago [in December 1993], fans waiting to meet, lunch and have tea with him included Walter Cronkite, Sen. Dirk Kempthorne (R-Idaho) and Supreme Court Justice Anthony Kennedy, who invited O'Brian to attend a session of the high court. Hollywood also wants a piece of the press-shy storyteller."

The novels sold over three million copies in 20 languages. In its review of 21: The Final Unfinished Voyage of Jack Aubrey (published in 2004), Publishers Weekly said that over six million copies had been sold. Thus O'Brian's greatest success in writing, gaining him fame, a following, and invitations to events and interviews came late in his life, when he was well into his seventies and accustomed to his privacy.

Shortly before his last completed novel was published in October 1999, O'Brian wrote an article for a series of the best in the millennium ending, titled "Full Nelson", choosing for his topic Admiral Nelson's victory in the Battle of the Nile in 1798.

=== Aubrey–Maturin series ===
Beginning in 1969, O'Brian began writing what turned into the 20-volume Aubrey–Maturin series of novels. The books are set in the early 19th century and describe the lives and careers of Captain Jack Aubrey of the Royal Navy and his friend, naval physician and naturalist Dr Stephen Maturin, a man of Irish and Catalan parents. The books are distinguished by O'Brian's deliberate use and adaptation of actual historical events, either integrating his protagonists in the action without changing the outcome, or using adapted historical events as templates. In addition to this trait and to O'Brian's distinctive literary style, his sense of humour is prominent (see Humour in main article, Aubrey–Maturin series).

The series employs technical sailing terminology throughout. Some critics consider the books a roman fleuve, which can be read as one long story; the books follow Aubrey and Maturin's professional and domestic lives continuously.

=== Other works ===
As well as his historical novels, O'Brian wrote three adult mainstream novels, six short-story collections, and a history of the Royal Navy aimed at young readers. He was also a respected translator, responsible for more than 30 translations from the French into English, including Henri Charrière's Papillon (UK) and Banco: The further adventures of Papillon, Jean Lacouture's biography of Charles de Gaulle, as well as many of Simone de Beauvoir's later works.

O'Brian wrote detailed biographies of Sir Joseph Banks, an English naturalist who took part in Cook's first voyage (and who appears briefly in O'Brian's Aubrey-Maturin series), and Pablo Picasso. His biography of Picasso is a massive and comprehensive study of the artist. Picasso and O'Brian both lived in the French village of Collioure and became acquainted there.

=== Adaptations ===
Peter Weir's 2003 film Master and Commander: The Far Side of the World is loosely based on the Aubrey-Maturin novel The Far Side of the World , but draws on a number of the novels for incidents within the film.

=== Awards, honours and recognition ===
In 1995 he was awarded the inaugural Heywood Hill Literary Prize, in the amount of £10,000 for his lifetime's writings. In his acceptance speech in July 1995, O'Brian, then age 80, said it was the first literary prize of his adult life. He received an honorary doctorate from Trinity College Dublin, and a CBE on June 17, 1997.

On 21–23 September 2001, the National Museum of the Royal Navy, Portsmouth, organised a The Patrick O'Brian Weekend to celebrate O'Brian's achievement in depicting Nelson's Navy in his novels. The weekend featured lectures by some of Britain's leading naval historians on "how the novels closely reflect the insights of modern scholarship". There was a concert of contemporary music and readings from his books. The weekend concluded with a tour of Nelson's flagship HMS Victory followed by a dinner on her lower gundeck. The event was repeated one year later at the same venue.

In 2003 a newly discovered weevil was named after O'Brian, Daisya obriani Anderson, following a donation to the Canadian Museum of Nature by an O'Brian fan site—an homage to the weevils that infest ship's rations in the novels.

== Original manuscripts ==
O'Brian claimed that he wrote "like a Christian, with ink and quill"; Mary was his first reader and typed his manuscripts "pretty" for the publisher. O'Brian handwrote all his books and stories, shunning both typewriter and word processor. The handwritten manuscripts for 18 Aubrey-Maturin novels have been acquired by the Lilly Library at Indiana University. Only two, The Letter of Marque and Blue at the Mizzen, owned by Stuart Bennet, remain in private hands. Bennet donated his correspondence from O'Brian to the Lilly Library; one letter recommends to Bennet that he donate the two manuscripts he holds to Indiana University, where the rest of the manuscripts reside. The O'Brian manuscript collection at the Lilly Library also includes the manuscripts for Picasso and Joseph Banks and detailed notes for six Aubrey/Maturin novels. The 2011 exhibit Blue at the Mizzen suggests that the manuscript was donated.

Nikolai Tolstoy also has an extensive collection of O'Brian manuscript material, including the second half of Hussein, several short stories, much of the reportedly "lost" book on Bestiaries, letters, diaries, journals, notes, poems, book reviews, and several unpublished short stories.

== Works ==
=== Aubrey–Maturin series ===
1. Master and Commander (1969)
2. Post Captain (1972)
3. HMS Surprise (1973)
4. The Mauritius Command (1977)
5. Desolation Island (1978)
6. The Fortune of War (1979)
7. The Surgeon's Mate (1980)
8. The Ionian Mission (1981)
9. Treason's Harbour (1983)
10. The Far Side of the World (1984)
11. The Reverse of the Medal (1986)
12. The Letter of Marque (1988)
13. The Thirteen-Gun Salute (1989)
14. The Nutmeg of Consolation (1991)
15. Clarissa Oakes (1992) (published as The Truelove in the US)
16. The Wine-Dark Sea (1993)
17. The Commodore (1994)
18. The Yellow Admiral (1996)
19. The Hundred Days (1998)
20. Blue at the Mizzen (1999)
21. The Final Unfinished Voyage of Jack Aubrey (2004) (published as 21 in the US)

=== Fiction (non-serial) ===
- Caesar (1930, his first book, which led him to be often labelled by critics as the 'boy-Thoreau')
- Hussein, An Entertainment (1938)
- Testimonies (1952) (First published in the UK as Three Bear Witness )
- The Catalans (1953) (The Frozen Flame in the UK)
- The Road to Samarcand (1954)
- The Golden Ocean (1956)
- The Unknown Shore (1959)
- Richard Temple (1962)

=== Short story collections ===
- Beasts Royal (1934)
- The Last Pool and Other Stories (1950)
- The Walker and Other Stories (1955)
- Lying in the Sun and Other Stories (1956)
- The Chian Wine and Other Stories (1974)
- Collected Short Stories (1994) (The Rendezvous and Other Stories in the US)
- The Complete Short Stories (2023)

=== Non-fiction ===
- Men-of-War: Life in Nelson's Navy (1974). ISBN 0-393-03858-0
- Pablo Ruiz Picasso: A Biography (1976) ISBN 978-0-393-31107-5
- Joseph Banks: A Life (1987) The Harvill Press, London. Paperback reprint, 1989. ISBN 1-86046-406-8
- Histoire Naturelle Des Indes: The Drake Manuscript in the Pierpont Morgan Library (1996) with Morgan Pierpont and Ruth S Kraemer, Translator, London: W W Norton. ISBN 978-0-393-03994-8

=== Poetry ===
- The Uncertain Land and Other Poems (2019)

=== French to English translations of other authors' works ===
- Daily Life of the Aztecs on the Eve of the Spanish Conquest by Jacques Soustelle. London, George Weidenfeld & Nicolson Ltd (1961)
- Daily Life in the Time of Jesus by Henri Daniel-Rops. London, George Weidenfeld & Nicolson Ltd (1962)
- Munich: Peace for Our Time by Henri Nogueres. London, George Weidenfeld & Nicolson Ltd (1965)
- The Horsemen by Joseph Kessel. New York: Farrar, Straus & Giroux (1968)
- Papillon by Henri Charrière. London, Rupert Hart-Davis (1970)
- Banco: The further adventures of Papillon by Henri Charrière. New York, William Morrow (1973)
- Target: Heydrich by Miroslav Ivanov (writer). London. Hart-Davis, MacGibbon (1973)
- Works by Simone de Beauvoir
- De Gaulle The Rebel 1890 – 1944 by Jean Lacouture. London, Collins Harvill (1990) ISBN 978-0-393-02699-3

=== Edited by O'Brian ===
- A Book of Voyages (1947) (First American Edition 2013) ISBN 978-0-393-08958-5

== Published biographies of O'Brian ==
Since O'Brian's death, two biographies have been published, though the first was well advanced when he died. The second is by O'Brian's stepson Nikolai Tolstoy.

Dean King's Patrick O'Brian: A Life Revealed was the first biography to document O'Brian's early life under his original name.

Tolstoy's two-volume biography, Patrick O'Brian: The Making of the Novelist (2004) and Patrick O'Brian: A Very Private Life (2019) make use of material from the Russ and Tolstoy families and sources, including O'Brian's personal papers and library which Tolstoy inherited on O'Brian's death.

== See also ==
- Lord Cochrane "the sea wolf" (1775–1860)
- Edward Pellew (1757–1833)

== General and cited references ==
- King, Dean (2000). Patrick O'Brian: A Life Revealed. London: Hodder and Stoughton. ISBN 0-340-792558.
- King, Dean H (2001). In Search of Patrick O'Brian. Holt (Henry) & Co, US. ISBN 0-8050-5977-6. (US edition of the above book)
- Tolstoy, Nikolai (2004). Patrick O'Brian: The Making of the Novelist. London: Century. ISBN 0-7126-7025-4.
- Tolstoy, Nikolai (2005). Patrick O'Brian: The Making of the Novelist 1914–1949. W W Norton & Co Ltd. ISBN 0-393-06130-2. (US edition of the above book)
- Tolstoy, Nikolai (2019). Patrick O'Brian: A Very Private Life. London: William Collins. ISBN 978-0-00-835058-1.

Also of importance when studying O'Brian's works:

- Cunningham, A E, ed. (1994). Patrick O'Brian: Critical Appreciations and a Bibliography. British Library. ISBN 0-7123-1071-1.
  - Cunningham, Arthur E, ed. (1994). Patrick O'Brian: Critical Essays and a Bibliography. W. W. Norton. ISBN 978-0393036268. (US edition of above book)
- O'Neill, Richard (2003). Patrick O'Brian's Navy: The Illustrated Companion to Jack Aubrey's World. Salamander Books. ISBN 0-7624-1540-1.
