= Aubrey–Maturin series =

Nautical historical novels by Patrick O'Brian

- Author: Patrick O'Brian
- Country: Great Britain
- Language: English
- Genre: Literary fiction, nautical fiction, historical fiction
- Published: 1969–2004

The Aubrey–Maturin series is a sequence of nautical historical novels—20 completed and one unfinished—by English author Patrick O'Brian, set during the Napoleonic Wars and centring on the friendship between Captain Jack Aubrey of the Royal Navy and his ship's surgeon Stephen Maturin, a physician, natural philosopher, and intelligence agent. The first novel, Master and Commander, was published in 1969 and the last finished novel in 1999. The 21st novel of the series, left unfinished at O'Brian's death in 2000, appeared in print in late 2004. The series received considerable international acclaim, and most of the novels reached The New York Times Best Seller list. These novels comprise the heart of the canon of an author often compared to Jane Austen, C. S. Forester and other British authors central to English literature.

The 2003 film Master and Commander: The Far Side of the World drew from three books in the series. Russell Crowe played the role of Jack Aubrey, and Paul Bettany that of Stephen Maturin.

== Development ==
Patrick O'Brian's The Golden Ocean (1956) and The Unknown Shore (1959) both depict fictional pairs of young men, loosely based on real seamen, who participate in George Anson's voyage around the world. In these two novels, O'Brian began to develop the models for the characters of Aubrey and Maturin as well as the storytelling techniques used in the series.

== Series ==
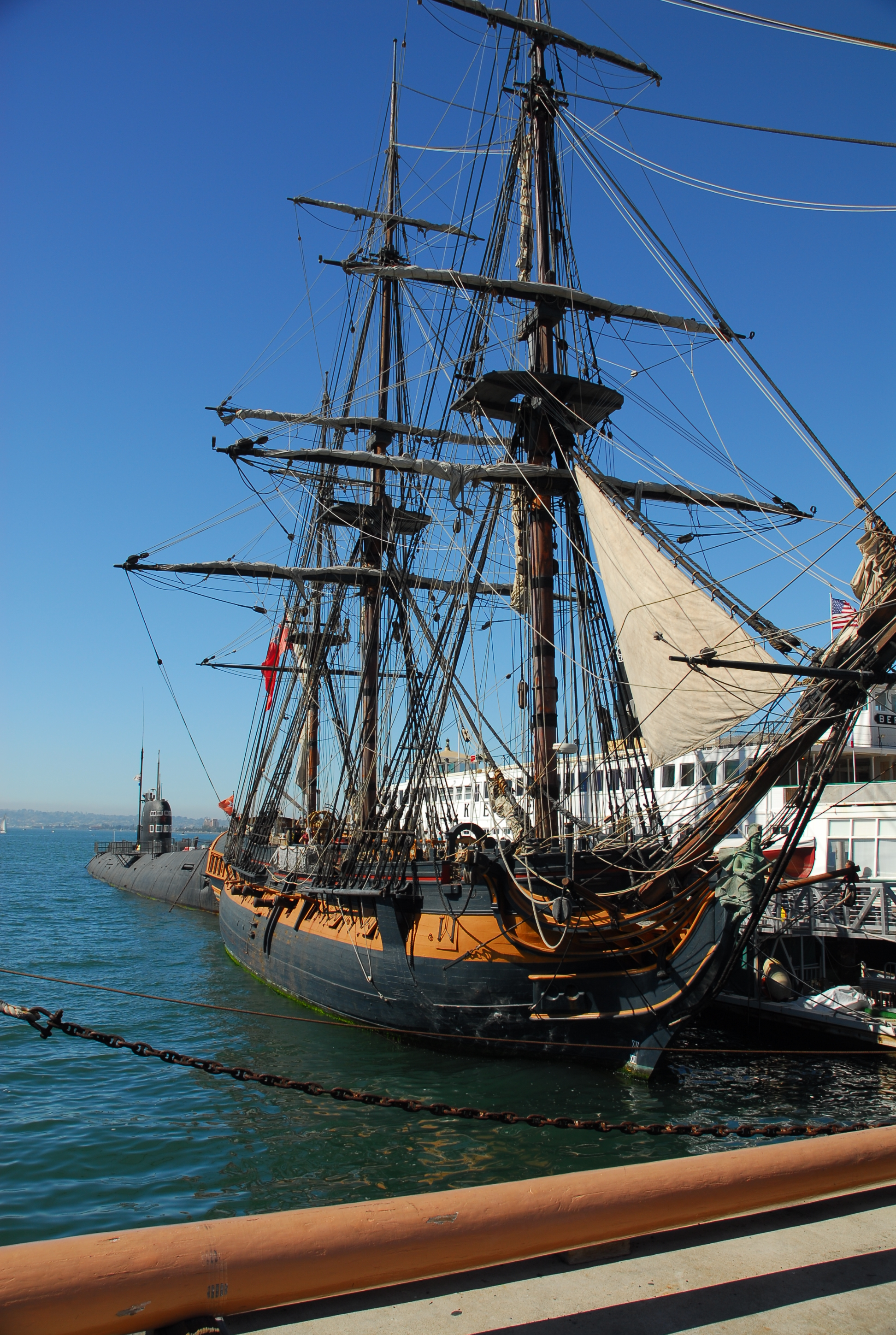
A replica of HMS Surprise at the San Diego Maritime Museum, based on HMS Rose and used in Master and Commander: The Far Side of the World

=== Novels in order of first publication ===
1. Master and Commander (1969)
2. Post Captain (1972)
3. HMS Surprise (1973)
4. The Mauritius Command (1977)
5. Desolation Island (1978)
6. The Fortune of War (1979)
7. The Surgeon's Mate (1980)
8. The Ionian Mission (1981)
9. Treason's Harbour (1983)
10. The Far Side of the World (1984)
11. The Reverse of the Medal (1986)
12. The Letter of Marque (1988)
13. The Thirteen-Gun Salute (1989)
14. The Nutmeg of Consolation (1991)
15. Clarissa Oakes (1992) – (The Truelove in the US)
16. The Wine-Dark Sea (1993)
17. The Commodore (1995)
18. The Yellow Admiral (1996)
19. The Hundred Days (1998)
20. Blue at the Mizzen (1999)
21. The Final Unfinished Voyage of Jack Aubrey (2004) – (21 in the US)

=== Internal chronology ===
O'Brian's books were written and published in the same chronological sequence as the events they describe, beginning with Master and Commander, set in 1800, and carrying through to the final novel, set in late 1815 after the Battle of Waterloo.

However, they do not strictly follow history. The first six books quickly move through twelve years of the Napoleonic Wars, as established by frequent reference to historical events, with The Fortune of War ending on 1 June 1813 with the battle between HMS Shannon and USS Chesapeake. The series then enters a kind of fantasy-time in which it takes another dozen novels to progress to November 1813. Much of this period is spent at sea, with little or no connection to real-world years, and the events of the novels take up substantially more time than the few months 'available'. External historical reference returns with The Yellow Admiral, the 18th book in the series. Towards the beginning of this novel, it is stated that the British army under the Duke of Wellington has entered France from Spain, which occurred in November 1813. Time is then paused again for a few chapters, as a narrative apparently lasting several months ensues before a specific arrival at Christmas 1813. Thereafter, the book and the next in the series (The Hundred Days) move swiftly through the historical events of Napoleon's disastrous invasion of Russia and his defeat in the War of the Sixth Coalition, his exile and escape from Elba, and his final campaign and defeat in June 1815. The last completed book in the series, Blue at the Mizzen, is the only volume which is set entirely after the conclusion of the Napoleonic Wars.

In his introduction to The Far Side of the World, the 10th book in the series, O'Brian wrote that if the author "had known how many books were to follow the first, he would certainly have started the sequence much earlier" in real historical time. He goes on to explain that "if his readers will bear with him", books of the series will be set in "hypothetical years, rather like those hypothetical moons used in the calculation of Easter: an 1812a as it were or even an 1812b". In effect, the period from June to December 1813 is stretched out to accommodate events that ought to occupy five or six years.

== Characters ==
The series focuses on two main characters, naval officer Jack Aubrey and physician, naturalist, and spy Stephen Maturin, and the ongoing plot is structured around Aubrey's ascent from lieutenant to rear admiral in the Royal Navy during the French Revolutionary and Napoleonic Wars.

Jack Aubrey is a large man (both literally and figuratively), described as having an energetic, gregarious, cheerful, and relatively simple personality and also a deep respect for naval tradition. Remarkable early success earned him the nickname "Lucky Jack Aubrey" and a reputation as a "fighting captain", a reputation which he sought to retain throughout his career. But while frequently "brilliant" and much respected at sea, he is less competent on land, as indiscreet liaisons, impertinent remarks, and poor financial decisions often bring him trouble. Aubrey's professional life of daring exploits and reverses was inspired by the chequered careers of Thomas Cochrane and other notable captains of the Royal Navy from the period.

Irish-Catalan Dr. Stephen Maturin ostensibly serves as an adept ship's surgeon on Aubrey's various commands. However, unknown to many of his associates, he also serves as a particularly skilled volunteer intelligence agent for the British Admiralty. Maturin is described as a small, quiet, "ugly" man who is known to cast a "dangerous, pale, reptilian eye" towards his enemies. Unlike his action-oriented friend, Maturin is very well-educated with several intellectual pursuits. He is passionately fascinated by the natural world, and takes every opportunity to explore the native wildlife of his ships' ports of call around the world. He is also deeply introspective, and frequently muses on philosophical concepts of identity and self-understanding in his ciphered personal journal. Another aspect of this complex character is portrayed by his long-lasting and frequently frustrating romantic pursuit of the beautiful but unreliable Diana Villiers. He uses several addictive substances, including laudanum and coca leaves, arising from scientific curiosity, control of his reactions to physical problems, and substance dependence. He has the values of a gentleman of the era, including a strong sense of honour and involvement in duels. The latter led him to develop a strong skill with pistols and duelling by swords.

Maturin's various professional roles and personal interests allow the series to leave the sea and explore different aspects of the political and social order during the Napoleonic Era. Eventually, Maturin upstages Aubrey in character development within the series due to the diverse situations in which O'Brian can place him.

On the surface, the two main characters have little in common. As O'Brian wrote in The Ionian Mission, "Although (they) were almost as unlike as men could be, unlike in nationality, religion, education, size, shape, profession, habit of mind, they were united in a deep love for music, and many and many an evening had they played together, violin answering cello or both singing together far into the night." This musical connection began in the first paragraph of the first book in the series, when the two characters meet at a concert. They also share a delight in puns and dry witticisms, and particularly memorable wordplay is sometimes repeated in subsequent novels in the series, years later in book-time. One character in the novel, Sir Joseph Blaine, saw the two friends as romantics, in his remarks on Maturin in HMS Surprise Chapter 4: "As I was saying, strong; but not without his weaknesses. He was blaming his particular friend for romantic notions the other day – the friend who is to marry the daughter of that woman we saw just now – and if I had not been so shocked by his condition, I should have been tempted to laugh. He is himself a perfect Quixote: an enthusiastic supporter of the Revolution until '93; a United Irishman until the rising, Lord Edward's adviser ... And now Catalan independence. Or perhaps I should say, Catalan independence from the beginning, simultaneously with the others. But always heart and soul, blood and purse in some cause from which he can derive no conceivable personal benefit."

Despite their many differences, the pair are invaluable and indispensable companions throughout many years of adventure and danger. Reviewers have compared Aubrey and Maturin to other seemingly mismatched yet inseparable fictional duos such as Don Quixote and Sancho Panza in Don Quixote, Holmes and Watson in the Sherlock Holmes stories, Captain Haddock and Tintin in the Adventures of Tintin, and Kirk and Spock in the original Star Trek TV series.

== Style ==
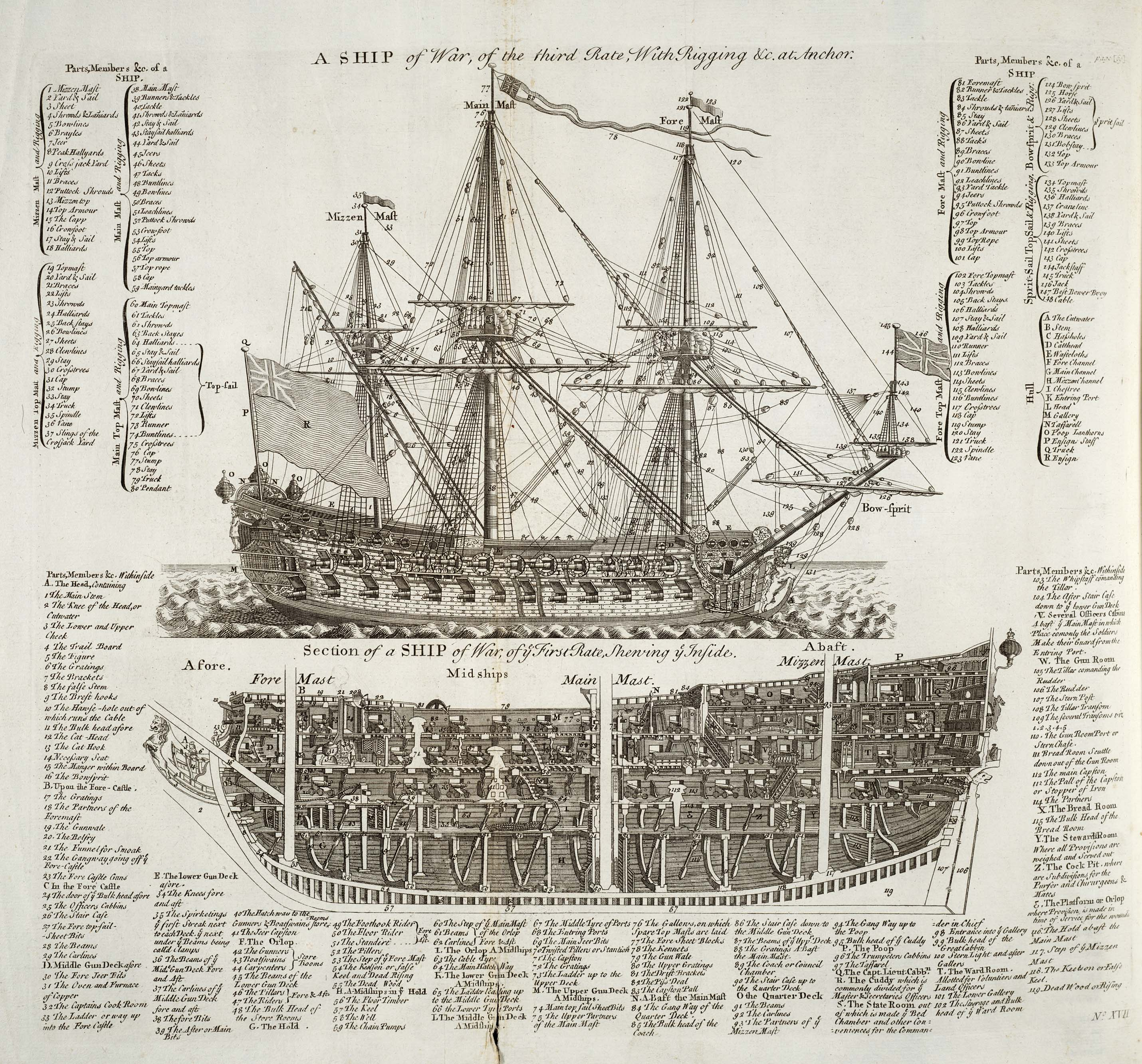
A diagram of 1728 illustrating the exterior and rigging of a third-rate ship and the interior of a first-rate ship.

The stories are primarily told in the third person from the points of view of the two main characters, Jack Aubrey and Stephen Maturin. The author sometimes employs a form of first-person narrative when his characters write in private journals or letters about events that are not otherwise described. The narrative point of view strays from the two main characters only briefly and seldom over the course of the series. One example is the opening scene of The Hundred Days, in which a gossipy conversation between anonymous sailors imparts important news and information about the main characters.

=== Period language and naval jargon ===
Patrick O'Brian once wrote, "Obviously, I have lived very much out of the world: I know little of present-day Dublin or London or Paris, even less of post-modernity, post-structuralism, hard rock or rap, and I cannot write with much conviction about the contemporary scene." This becomes obvious for readers of the Aubrey–Maturin Series, as he adopts a narrative voice contemporary with their setting. Richard Ollard, in examining the general reception to O'Brian's books, suggests that O'Brian's naval officers would be able to talk with and recognise Jane Austen's characters.

In addition to the period language, O'Brian is adept at using naval jargon with little or no translation for the "lubberly" reader. The combination of the historical-voice narration and naval terms may seem daunting at first to some readers; but most note that after a short while a "total immersion" effect results. Occasionally, O'Brian explains obscure nautical terms by placing Stephen Maturin into the tutelage of seamen, allowing the author to vicariously teach the reader about various parts and functions of a period sailing vessel without breaking from the narrative. This was especially common early in the series, when Maturin was still new to the Royal Navy.

In the first of the series, during a tour of the rigging, Maturin asks his guide if he "could not explain this maze of ropes and wood and canvas without using sea-terms" and receives the reply "No, for it is by those names alone that they are known, in nearly every case".

Also, O'Brian often addresses the historical events and themes within his books indirectly, allowing a fuller immersion for his readers without flaunting his historical understanding, unlike other similar nautical authors.

=== Humour ===
O'Brian's bone-dry and cutting wit is present throughout all his novels. Its delivery, whether in the form of narration or dialogue, is often so forthright that the reader may not perceive it at first. At times, however, O'Brian will spend a considerable portion of a volume setting up comical sequences – for example, Jack's use of rum in the "debauchery" of Maturin's pet sloth in HMS Surprise or Jack's assertion to William Babbington, while discussing nautical terminology, that "Sheep ain't poetical", supporting his statement by saying: "Remember that fellow in the play who calls out: 'My Kingdom for a horse'? Would not have been poetry at all, had he said sheep." (See The Ionian Mission.) Drunk animals are a common motif through the series; for instance the following conversation between Jack and Stephen in Post Captain: "'The carrier has brought you an ape.' 'What sort of an ape?' asked Stephen. 'A damned ill-conditioned sort of an ape. It had a can of ale at every pot-house on the road, and is reeling drunk. It has been offering itself to Babbington.'"

Puns—often "bad" on the part of Jack—are also common throughout the novels, much to the chagrin of Stephen Maturin. Jack takes a special, perhaps overzealous, interest in nautical puns. For example, Jack often repeats one of Stephen's spur-of-the-moment puns regarding dog-watches. At a dinner, replying to a lubber's question on the term 'dog-watch' (Post Captain, Chapter 12), Stephen suggests it is "because they are curtailed, of course" ("Cur Tailed", "cur" meaning "dog"), and like other puns, Aubrey repeats the witticism as often as occasion allows. The use of humour contrasts the two central characters. Aubrey is direct and forthright while Stephen is subtle and cunning, mirroring the overall personality of each man, especially regarding warfare tactics (ships, cannons and swords compared to intelligence gathering).

O'Brian has Aubrey speaking many proverbs, but usually in mangled form, such as "There's a great deal to be said for making hay while the iron is hot" (from Treason's Harbour and similarly in Desolation Island). In HMS Surprise (Chapter 6), Aubrey says that "A bird in the hand is worth any amount of beating about the bush". Sometimes Aubrey gets in a muddle and Maturin affectionately mocks him by playing on the mixed metaphor: '... they have chosen their cake, and must lie in it.'; Maturin replies, 'You mean, they cannot have their bed and eat it?' (also from HMS Surprise, Chapter 7). Related to proverbs, Aubrey tells Maturin a clever Wellerism, "'It's not a fit night out for man or beast,' as the centaur observed, ha, ha, ha!" (Yellow Admiral).

== Publication history ==
Master and Commander was first published in 1969, in the US by Lippincott, and in Great Britain and Ireland by Collins in 1970. The series continued to be a modest success in both countries, though publication was only by Collins in the UK after the fourth novel. Publication in the US ceased with Desolation Island in 1978. However, in 1989, Starling Lawrence of W. W. Norton & Company discovered the novels while visiting O'Brian's agent and finished O'Brian's The Reverse of the Medal on his return flight to New York City. Norton began printing the books, and they were taken more seriously by critics and became a publishing success. O'Brian's series of novels sold over 400,000 copies in the next two years and continued to be a success, selling over 2 million copies by 2000. In its review of the last unfinished novel in 2004, Publishers Weekly reported that the series had sold over 6 million copies. W. W. Norton released the novels in e-book format on 5 December 2011. The full series has been published in German, French, and Italian translations, the twenty finished books also in Spanish, and part of the series in Catalan, Chinese, Czech, Finnish, Japanese, Polish, Portuguese, Swedish, and Russian translation.

== Literary significance and criticism ==
O'Brian is sometimes compared to Jane Austen, C. S. Forester and other British authors central to the English literature canon. Though sometimes compared to Trollope, Melville, Conrad and even Proust, the Aubrey–Maturin series has most often been compared to the works of Jane Austen, one of O'Brian's greatest inspirations in English literature. In a cover story in The New York Times Book Review published on 6 January 1991, Richard Snow characterised Patrick O'Brian's Aubrey–Maturin naval adventure novels as "the best historical novels ever written. On every page Mr. O'Brian reminds us with subtle artistry of the most important of all historical lessons: that times change but people don't, that the griefs and follies and victories of the men and women who were here before us are in fact the maps of our own lives." In a Washington Post article, Ken Ringle wrote, "... the Aubrey–Maturin series is better thought of as a single multi-volume novel, that, far beyond any episodic chronicle, ebbs and flows with the timeless tide of character and the human heart."

Frank McNally, writing in honour of the 100th anniversary of the author's birth, reflects on the breadth of the appeal of the series of novels, for the quality of the writing and the relationships between the characters, which put them beyond the typical naval adventure, and gain interest from readers who "wouldn't touch Horatio Hornblower with a bargepole." Lucy Eyre wrote to point out the appeal of the series to women readers, mentioning the nautical detail, and how it might be viewed the same as precise medical language on the television program ER. She notes that "O'Brian is never heavy-handed with his research: it's simply that the books are set in a perfectly realised world, which happens to be a ship at war."

When reviewing The Wine-Dark Sea in the Hudson Review, Gary Krist is very critical of the plot of the books, suggesting that the books are full of elements of "pop fiction" and O'Brian's excessive "delight in the sheer specificity of seafaring mechanics." However, he did not deny the qualities that "push it close to that great, fuzzy art-entertainment meridian" including character development and at times, "the sense of being in the presence of an active, complex, and compassionate intelligence."

Numerous authors have admired the Aubrey–Maturin series, including Iris Murdoch, Eudora Welty and Tom Stoppard. Science fiction author David Drake has stated that his Republic of Cinnabar Navy was inspired by the Aubrey–Maturin books.

On 5 November 2019 BBC News listed The Jack Aubrey Novels on its list of the 100 most influential novels.

== Adaptations ==
=== BBC Radio ===
In 1995, Master and Commander was dramatised in six parts, with Michael Troughton as Aubrey and Nigel Anthony as Maturin.

The Mauritius Command, Desolation Island, HMS Surprise and The Fortune of War were all subsequently adapted between 2008 and 2018. All starred David Robb as Aubrey and Richard Dillane as Maturin.

=== Film ===
The Aubrey–Maturin series formed the basis for the 2003 film Master and Commander: The Far Side of the World directed by Peter Weir and starring Russell Crowe as Aubrey and Paul Bettany as Maturin. The primary plot of the movie is based on that of The Far Side of the World (the 10th book of the series) while other events and characters are adapted from other novels in the series.

The film was a critical success and grossed $212 million worldwide but has not yet spawned a sequel despite the sentiments of critics, fans of the movie and the book series, and Crowe himself. However, a prequel was reportedly under development as of 2021.

== See also ==
- Frederick Marryat, a 19th-century pioneer of the nautical novel, who wrote under the name "Captain Marryat"—a real-life successful naval officer in the Napoleonic Wars, and thus a contemporary of Aubrey and Maturin
- Ramage, first of a series of novels about Lord Ramage, an officer in the Royal Navy during the Napoleonic Wars, written by Dudley Pope
- Alexander Kent, pseudonym of Douglas Reeman for his Bolitho novels, a contemporary of O'Brian who wrote a series of novels about the Royal Navy during the Napoleonic Wars

== Bibliography ==
- Brown, Anthony Gary (2006). The Patrick O'Brian Muster Book: Persons, Animals, Ships and Cannon in the Aubrey–Maturin Sea Novels. McFarland & Company. ISBN 0-7864-2482-6.
- Brunvand, Jan Harold (January 2004). "The Early Bird is Worth Two in the Bush: Captain Jack Aubrey's Fractured Proverbs". In Lau, Kimberly J.; Tokofsky, Peter; Winick, Stephen D. (eds.). What Goes Around comes Around: The Circulation of Proverbs in Contemporary Life. Logan, Utah: Utah State University Press. pp. 152–170.
- Cunningham, A. E., ed. (1994). Patrick O'Brian: A Bibliography and Critical Appreciation. Boston Spa: British Library. ISBN 0-7123-1071-1.
- King, Dean (2000). Patrick O'Brian:A Life. MacMillan. ISBN 978-0-8050-5977-9.
- King, Dean (2001). A Sea of Words: Lexicon and Companion for Patrick O'Brian's Seafaring Tales (3rd ed.). Henry Holt and Company. ISBN 0-8050-6615-2.
- King, Dean (2001). Harbors and High Seas: Map Book and Geographical Guide to the Aubrey/Maturin Novels of Patrick O'Brian. Henry Holt and Company. ISBN 0-8050-6614-4.
