= The Surgeon's Mate =

1980 novel by Patrick O'Brian

- First edition
- Author: Patrick O'Brian
- Language: English
- Series: Aubrey–Maturin series
- Genre: Historical novel
- Publisher: Collins (UK)
- Publication date: 1980
- Publication place: United Kingdom
- Media type: Print (Hardback & Paperback) & Audio Book (Cassette, CD)
- Pages: 382 (paperback edition)
- ISBN: 0-00-222406-2 first edition hardback
- OCLC: 31728377
- Preceded by: The Fortune of War
- Followed by: The Ionian Mission

The Surgeon's Mate is the seventh historical novel in the Aubrey–Maturin series written by Patrick O'Brian, first published in 1980. The story is set during the War of 1812 and the Napoleonic Wars.

Buoyed by victory over an American ship, Aubrey, Maturin and Diana Villiers speed to England on a mail packet that is chased for the papers in Maturin's hands, and possibly for Diana herself. The papers, including a copy of the official report of victory over an American ship, thus arrive in England before the originals, as the packet sailed to outrun the American chasers. Aubrey then commands HMS Ariel for a mission on the Danish coast, which ultimately leads him and Maturin once again to being prisoners of war.

This novel was part of the reissue of the series, with copies not always available in the original order written. This was a challenge to readers and reviewers of that time (1990–92), who did not fit this novel into its place in the sequence, suggesting each novel can be read on its own. It was praised as part of "O'Brian's superb series on the early-19th-century adventures" of Jack Aubrey and Stephen Maturin, and specifically marked as "Splendid escape. Literate and amusing.", providing a "look at the darker side of Maturin's life: his work in British intelligence."

== Plot summary ==
Sailing into Halifax, the victorious HMS Shannon contends with her losses in officers and crew, with particular concern for Captain Broke, who lies unconscious from head wounds. The American Captain Lawrence dies en route from the battle and is buried at Halifax. Once in port, as prisoners of war are taken ashore and the British Navy deserters identified among them, the Shannons and her passengers, Captain Jack Aubrey, Dr Stephen Maturin, and Mrs Diana Villiers, feel the full joy of the first naval victory in the ongoing war with America. Maturin communicates with Major Beck, an army counterpart in intelligence work. At the victory ball, Aubrey is pursued by Amanda Smith, known to Diana for her predatory ways. Jack spends the night with Miss Smith then quickly tires of her, yet she persists. He receives his first letters from his wife Sophia since the Leopard was left in the Dutch East Indies, so long ago. Others write the report of Broke's victory, to speed the official news to England.

Captain Dalgleish on the mail packet Diligence carries a copy of the official report, and Aubrey, Maturin, and Mrs Villiers as passengers. The American privateer Liberty and another, unnamed, vessel, have lay in wait for Diligence and chase her on the northern route home. Diana is certain the privateers have been hired by the vengeful Johnson, who will spare no expense in recovering the intelligence papers and the priceless heirloom diamond, the Blue Peter, which Stephen and Diana have stolen from him. The Liberty eventually wrecks on submerged ice in the foggy Grand Banks, her crew taken aboard by her follower, while the Diligence escapes and reaches the English Channel in 17 days. News of the victory is well-received in England, but Jack is eager to get home. His daughters and son have grown much since he last saw them, and his wife Sophia has admirably managed the ploys of the projector Kimber, in whose fraudulent schemes Jack has unwisely invested much of his fortune. Stephen visits Ireland for his uncle. He gives Johnson's private papers to Sir Joseph Blaine and asks him for Diana's release, whose American citizenship has caused her to be held in British custody. Blaine also recommends a lawyer for Aubrey to deal with the projector. Taking Diana with him, Stephen travels to Paris on a strictly scientific trip to present his work at the Institut de France, which he hopes will have the additional effect of quieting French suspicions that he is an intelligence agent. At the Institut, Diana wears the Blue Peter, of which she is quite fond. Stephen learns of the death of a Catalan poet, Ponsich, on an intelligence mission near Pomerania.

Jack's uncanny knack for inviting trouble on land is compounded when he begins receiving letters at home from Miss Smith, who claims to be pregnant by him, though Stephen suggests she is lying. Stephen visits Blaine again, who explains that Ponsich was killed during a botched diplomatic mission to capture the battery fortifying the French-held island of Grimsholm, off the coast of Denmark in the Baltic Sea. The battery is manned by Catalan troops assigned there by Bonaparte and kept loyal through false promises. They are led by Colonel Ramón d'Ullastret, who coincidentally is Stephen's godfather. Blaine explains that Grimsholm is too heavily fortified to be taken by force, but suggests that if the Catalans could be persuaded to surrender the island, it would change the situation in the Baltic enough to allow Prussia to join the offensive against Bonaparte. Stephen volunteers to perform the mission himself, with Jack as his captain.

Jack is offered command of the sloop HMS Ariel, leaving on the next tide, with no time to stop at home for his sea chest. Mr Pellworm, an experienced Baltic pilot, is on board when he arrives, and Mr Jagiello, a young and handsome Lithuanian officer with the Swedish army, will serve as interpreter. Passing Elsinore, Danish shore batteries fire upon Ariel but miss the ship. At Carlscrona, they meet with commander of the Baltic fleet Admiral James Saumarez to devise a plan to land Stephen safely on Grimsholm: they will capture a Danish vessel, load her with wine and tobacco, and earn the battery's trust by bringing fresh supplies. Ariel chases a suitable vessel for some time but then discovers the Danish privateer Minnie heading towards Grimsholm. Attempting to escape by luring Ariel into a tangle of shoals and reefs off the Danish coast, Minnie runs aground. Several French officers whom Minnie had been carrying to Grimsholm escape to the mainland, though Ariel captures the rest. The Ariels work feverishly to refloat the Minnie. Stephen and Jagiello question some of the captured sailors about the proper signals for approaching Grimsholm, but Stephen senses their deception. He suggests to Jack a new tactic: the Minnie, flying Danish colours, will feign being chased by Ariel as she approaches the battery, which may allow outdated signals to be overlooked and the Minnie to land. The Ariels sailing the Minnie are disguised as Danish merchants.

The ruse works, though the Ariel gets dangerously close to the battery's guns. When Stephen begins speaking Catalan and greets Colonel d'Ullastret, he is accepted by the garrison and manages to convince them to turn against Bonaparte over dinner. No lives are lost as the British take the fortified island. Admiral Saumarez welcomes Colonel d’Ullastret, pleased with their success. The Colonel boards the Ariel, while the Catalan garrison travels in troop transports to Spain with Aeolus as escort, again navigating the narrow channels past Denmark. They fall in with an enormous international convoy of merchant ships escorted by the Royal Navy. Near Gothenburg, an Ariel crewmember drops the ship's only chronometer in heavy seas, so they sail into the North Sea and the shallow waters of the English Channel unable to accurately chart their exact location and without the Aeolus, which has taken refuge from the storm, leaving Ariel and her transport ships alone. Mr Pellworm predicts a fierce gale will beset them, but Jack is eager to reach the Bay of Biscay before it strikes. In heavy rains, Ariel meets one French ship, the Méduse, being chased by HMS Jason. Jack signals the troop transports to part so that Ariel can intervene to allow Jason to catch the fast-sailing Méduse.

Having done some damage to Méduse, Ariel is embayed in Douarnenez Bay on the coast of Brittany. While trying to beat their way out, a mishap causes the Ariel to strike a rock and she is washed ashore. The officers and crew are taken as prisoners of war by French soldiers on shore. Colonel d’Ullastret is given a Marine's uniform and a false name, and he promptly escapes overland. Jack, Stephen, and Jagiello are taken to Paris with the terse Monsieur Duhamel and lodged in the Temple, an ancient prison now being gradually demolished. Jack works on a way to escape from their cells by removing heavy stones in the privy chute, with help from Jagiello. Stephen is questioned by competing French intelligence groups; from one he learns that Diana has miscarried. To his surprise and suspicion, Duhamel makes an offer from parties expecting the emperor's defeat. He brings the prisoners English newspapers, from which Jack happily learns that HMS Ajax took Méduse, making his efforts worthwhile, and that Miss Smith has married.

Before Duhamel can return to collect him, Stephen is taken once more for questioning and deduces that an immense sum has been offered for his release when one of the interrogators mentions someone has paid "half Golconda" to the French authorities. Suddenly, Johnson arrives at the interrogation and identifies Stephen as the killer of Dubreuil and Pontet-Canet; Stephen is immediately taken to a dungeon cell, where he expects to be tortured, but is returned to Jack and Jagiello the following day. Now desperate to escape as soon as possible, the trio hurries to finish their excavation in the privy chute, but Duhamel arrives just as the last stone is removed. Convinced that Duhamel's offer is sincere, he leads them out of the Temple, picks up Diana, and remarks how Jack's escape shaft will be the explanation for their disappearance. They board the packet ship HMS Oedipus under Jack's long-time midshipman and newly promoted captain William Babbington. Stephen's mysterious benefactor turns out to have been Diana, who has given up the Blue Peter, a diamond from the Golconda mines, to a French minister in exchange for his release, though she is unaware of Stephen's escape having been procured through Duhamel. As the ship crosses the Channel to England, Stephen and Diana are finally married, with Jack giving her away and Babbington officiating.

== Characters ==
See also Recurring characters in the Aubrey–Maturin series

Halifax

- Jack Aubrey: Captain recently escaped as prisoner of war of the Americans, learns his next ship was assigned to another captain.
- Stephen Maturin: Ship's surgeon, physician, natural philosopher, friend to Jack and intelligence officer.
- Diana Villiers: Cousin to Sophia, and the love of Stephen's life, who becomes his wife. She was introduced in Post Captain.
- Mr Wallis: Lieutenant in command of HMS Shannon coming into Halifax.
- Mr Falkiner: Lieutenant in command of the prize, USS Chesapeake, coming into Halifax.
- Philip Broke: Captain of the Shannon, seriously injured from head wounds from the battle with Chesapeake.
- Admiral Colpoys: Port admiral in Halifax for the Royal Navy.
- Lady Harriet Colpoys: Wife of the admiral, accepts Mrs. Villiers as house guest, and hosts a ball to celebrate the victory.
- Major Beck: Army intelligence office in Halifax, who read the papers Maturin collected.
- James Lawrence: Captain of the USS Chesapeake, died en route to Halifax from his wounds in the battle, where the British buried him.
- Miss Amanda Smith: Attractive and deceptive woman who pursues Aubrey in Halifax.
- Mr Dalgleish: Owner and captain of the hired mail courier Diligence sailing out of Halifax.

England

- Sophia Aubrey: Jack's wife and mother of their three children. She was introduced in Post Captain.
- Mr Kimber: The schemer (projector) with a process to recover the lead and silver from "valuable dross" on Aubrey's land, now unwanted by Aubrey and pursued by his lawyer. He was introduced in the fifth novel, Desolation Island.
- General Aubrey: Jack's father, recently associating with the Radical party in Parliament, teaching his grandchildren how to campaign and to vote at Ashgrove Cottage, a dead weight on his son's career.
- Sir Joseph Blaine: Senior figure at the Admiralty and Maturin's spymaster.
- Pompeu Ponsich: Famed Catalan scholar sent on the sloop Daphne by Blaine to meet Colonel d'Ullastret at Grismholm Island.
- Skinner: Lawyer recommended by Sir Joseph to help Aubrey with the projector Kimber.
- Andrew Wray: Once cheated Aubrey at cards, now appointed acting 2nd secretary of the Navy. He was introduced in the fifth novel Desolation Island.
- Mrs Broad: Owner of The Grapes in the Savoy, where Maturin keeps rooms. She was introduced in the second novel, Post Captain.
- James Grant: Was first lieutenant in the Leopard after Recife, parted in boats before reaching Desolation Island and returned safely to England. On return, he has received no other ships. He blames Aubrey, denying the Dutch 74 gun ship sunk by the Leopard was armed, blocking prize money.

Sailing the Baltic Sea

- Gedymin Jagiello: Young handsome Lithuanian cavalry officer, seconded to the Admiralty from the Swedish army. He is useful to the mission, cheerful, popular, attractive to women, but dismisses their attention because he sees true friendship between a man and a woman as being impossible in a sexist world.
- Mr Hyde: First lieutenant on the Ariel as Aubrey is captain for the mission in the Baltic. He works hard, but Aubrey judges him not a born seaman. He confuses left and right, sometimes with disastrous consequences.
- Mr Pellworm: Pilot who knows the Baltic well, and sails with the Ariel in those waters, on board before Aubrey arrived, and dropped off at Deal on return. He quotes poetry freely.
- Ramon d'Ullastret i Casademon: Catalan colonel at Grimsholm Island and Stephen Maturin's godfather. Proud and talkative.
- Admiral Sir James Saumarez: Vice-Admiral of the Royal Navy's Baltic Fleet at Carlscrona.
- General Mercier: French general on his way, with Colonel Ligier, to Grimsholm to deal with the situation of breakdown of command, under orders from Oudinot. Mercier and Ligier escape the beached Minnie on a boat, which Ariel shatters.
- The Gentleman's Relish: A Swedish actress who entered Jagiello's cabin when he was out, very much unwanted.
- Mr Smithson: Most senior captain of the troop carriers, directed by Aubrey to sail on to Santandero (Santander, Spain) on the Spanish coast of the Bay of Biscay.

France

- Monsieur Duhamel: French secret agent, preparing for the possible defeat of the emperor. He negotiates with Maturin on the terms to return to England, meeting exactly all but one, the return of the Blue Peter to its owner before they leave Paris.
- Madame Lehideux: Attractive widow who lives across from the Temple and who cooks meals, cleans clothes and sends tools for escape to the three prisoners in the Temple in Paris. Like so many women, she finds Jagiello very appealing. Once the wall goes down, the two communicate by signs.
- Major Clapier: One of the many who interrogate Maturin, in places away from the Temple in Paris, with a link to the American spy Johnson.
- Henry (Harry) Johnson: Wealthy American whose personal papers were confiscated by Maturin in Boston; he is a spy and was once lover to Diana Villiers. He pursues his vengeance across the Atlantic, into Paris. He was first mentioned in the third novel, HMS Surprise.
- William Babbington: Midshipman and lieutenant under Aubrey and now a commander. He was an admirer of Diana as midshipman during the Peace. He is captain of the packet ship HMS Oedipus. He was introduced in the first novel, Master and Commander.

== Ships ==
- British
  - HMS Ariel
  - HMS Shannon
  - HMS Humbug
  - HMS Oedipus
  - HMS Ajax
  - HMS Jason
- Danish
  - Minnie (privateer)
- French:
  - Méduse

== Title ==
The book title is a triple entendre in its use of the term "mate", referring to the ship's surgeon's mate, a chess reference to Maturin's successful espionage efforts (i.e., checkmate), and Diana Villiers becoming Stephen's wife, the surgeon's mate.

In 1617 a British naval handbook bore the title The Surgeon's Mate. The handbook recommended citrus fruit and fresh vegetables as a cure for scurvy, a fatal disease caused by the lack in vitamin C of sailors' onboard diet, a nutrient now known to be essential to prevent scurvy. (The advice was ignored at the time, and scurvy continued to kill more sailors than battles did into the 18th century.)

== Reviews ==
While one reviewer finds this novel a story of both Aubrey and Maturin, another sees it primarily as a story of Maturin, with light shed on his dark world of intelligence and spies.

Kirkus Reviews find the story literate and amusing, and "polished, historically accurate, and intensely pleasurable tales" from the era of the Napoleonic Wars. The many actions in the plot are noted: "This time out, Captain Jack Aubrey and ship's surgeon Stephen Maturin limp home from America for a brief rest before sailing to the Baltic to subvert the occupying Catalan troops—and then to the Bay of Biscay to run aground ... The Baltic mission is successful, but the subsequent flight from Scandinavia runs into the rocks off the French coast. The officers are taken prisoner". Their comments on the novels include historical accuracy, writing style and overall experience: "these polished, historically accurate, and intensely pleasurable tales of the Royal Navy in the Napoleonic era. ... Splendid escape. Literate and amusing."

Publishers Weekly finds the series superb, and this novel looking at the dark side of intelligence work. The plot aspect of note is that "Aubrey, Maturin and Diana Villiers (Maturin's fickle and enigmatic love) are passengers on a packet ship from Nova Scotia to England when two American privateers give chase. They are hunting Maturin". Once in England, Maturin proceeds to France with the war still on, "Armed with safe conduct papers, he lectures on natural history and installs Villiers in Paris." and he refuses to be tricked by the French agents. Then, "Maturin is sent to woo Catalan officers and troops from the French cause to the British", continuing to view the novel through Maturin's role. "Aubrey provides transport, but ... the mission takes a nasty turn when their ship founders; seized by the French, Maturin and Aubrey are hauled off to Paris's infamous Temple Prison."

== Allusion to historical events ==
In 1807, the Spanish government, at that time allied with France, had sent 15,000 troops to Denmark to act as a garrison against a possible British landing there. These troops, among the best in Spain, garrisoned offshore islands in small detachments and remained in the dark about political developments in Spain following Napoleon's invasion and occupation of Spain in 1807 (see Peninsular War).

The Duke of Wellington dispatched the Scottish Benedictine monk James Robertson (on the advice of his brother Richard Wellesley, 1st Marquess Wellesley). Robertson, brought up at the Benedictine abbey at Regensburg in Germany, managed to pass through occupied Germany under the guise of "Adam Rohrauer", a dealer in cigars and chocolate. Robertson made contact with the Spanish general, the Marquis de la Romana, on the island of Funen, where the two agreed that the Spanish troops would defect and return to Spain on British ships. Robertson escaped to Heligoland (then a British possession) to inform Admiral Richard Goodwin Keats of the agreement, and a fleet of transports escorted by HMS Superb embarked 9,000 Spanish soldiers. The island named in the novel is fictional, but positioned off the Pomeranian coast and its garrisons were in similar ignorance of the progress of the war regarding their homeland.

The imprisonment of Aubrey and Maturin in the Temple prison in Paris may echo the case of Captain Sidney Smith, captured on 19 April 1796 while attempting to cut out a French ship in Le Havre. Instead of exchanging him as was customary, the French took Smith to the Temple prison and charged him with arson for his burning of the fleet at Toulon in 1793. Smith remained held in Paris for two years, despite a number of efforts to exchange him and frequent contacts with both French Royalists and British agents.

In 1798, Royalists pretending to take him to another prison instead helped him to escape. They brought him to Le Havre, where he boarded a fishing boat and then transferred to a British frigate on patrol in the English Channel, arriving in London on 8 May 1798. Some historians have speculated that he allowed the French Republicans to capture him so that he could make contact with the Royalists.

== Allusions to science and technology ==
In Chapter 9, Aubrey explains rather clearly, in dialogue with Maturin, how a chronometer or watch set to Greenwich time, compared with local noon, lets a navigator establish longitude, or distance from Greenwich as the reference time point, when the sole chronometer set to Greenwich time is broken by one of the crew. Because they left England in such a hurry, Aubrey was not able to fetch his own set of chronometers from home. After the standard issue ship chronometer is dropped and broken by the lieutenant while returning from the Baltic, the lack of a chronometer combined with constantly stormy skies made it impossible to accurately navigate, leading to the Ariel's eventual foundering on the coast of France.

== Series chronology ==
This novel references actual events with accurate historical detail, like all in this series. In respect to the internal chronology of the series, it is the first of eleven novels that might take five or six years to happen but are all pegged to an extended 1812, or as Patrick O'Brian says it, 1812a and 1812b (introduction to The Far Side of the World, the tenth novel in this series). The events of The Yellow Admiral again match up with the historical years of the Napoleonic wars in sequence, as the first six novels did.

== Author's Note ==
(copied in whole, for later use in its parts)

Great men can afford anachronism, and indeed it is rather agreeable to find Criseyde reading the lives of the saints or Hamlet going to school at Wittenberg; but perhaps the ordinary writer should not take many liberties with the past. If he does, he sacrifices both authenticity and the willing suspension of disbelief, and he is sure to receive letters from those with a greater love of precision than himself. Only the other day a learned Dutchman reproached me for having sprinkled eau de Cologne in the forepeak of HMS Shannon in my last book: the earliest English reference to eau de Cologne, said he, quoting the Oxford Dictionary, is in a letter of Byron's dated 1830. I believe he was mistaken in assuming that no Englishman ever spoke of eau de Cologne before that time; but his letter made me uneasy in my mind, all the more so since in this present book I have deliberately kept Sir James Saumarez in the Baltic some months after he had taken the Victory home and struck his flag. In the first draft I had relied on the Dictionary of National Biography, which maintained the Admiral in command for my chosen period: but then, checking in the memoirs of one of his subordinates, I found that in fact another man had taken his place. Yet I did want to say something about Saumarez, an outstanding example of a particular type of sea-officer of that time, deeply religious, extremely capable, and a most effective diplomat, so as I really could not rearrange the calendar any more I decided to leave things as they were, although out of some obscure feeling of respect for that noble ship I omitted all reference to the Victory. The historical sequence, therefore, is not quite exact; but I trust that the candid reader will grant me this amount of licence.

== Publication history ==
- 1980 Collins hardback first edition ISBN 0-00-222406-2
- 1992 W W Norton paperback ISBN 0-393-30820-0
- Recorded Books Unabridged Audio edition narrated by Patrick Tull (ISBN 1402591845)
- 2011, USA, W W Norton & Company (ISBN 978-0-393-06376-9), Pub date 5 December 2011, e-book

The books in this series by Patrick O'Brian were re-issued in the US by W. W. Norton & Co. in 1992, after a re-discovery of the author and this series by Norton, finding a new audience for the entire series. Norton issued The Surgeon's Mate twelve years after its initial publication, as a paperback in 1992. Ironically, it was a US publisher, J. B. Lippincott & Co., who asked O'Brian to write the first book in the series, Master and Commander published in 1969. Collins picked it up in the UK, and continued to publish each novel as O'Brian completed another story. Beginning with The Nutmeg of Consolation in 1991, the novels were released at about the same time in the USA (by W W Norton) and the UK (by HarperCollins, the name of Collins after a merger).

Kirkus Reviews mentions the arrival of books out of order to a reviewer's desk: "The dashing Aubrey/Maturin naval tales (among others, The Ionian Mission--see above) continue to come out in intervals from England, where they are hugely and deservedly popular. Published some years ago in the UK, they've been arriving out of order, so readers find themselves sorting out prequels from sequels. But shipping arrangements do no damage to these polished, historically accurate, and intensely pleasurable tales of the Royal Navy in the Napoleonic era."

Novels prior to 1992 were published rapidly in the US for that new market. Following novels were released at the same time by the UK and US publishers. Collins asked Geoff Hunt in 1988 to do the cover art for the twelve books published by then, with The Letter of Marque being the first book to have Hunt's work on the first edition. He continued to paint the covers for future books; the covers were used on both USA and UK editions. Reissues of earlier novels used the Geoff Hunt covers.

== Adaptations ==
In 2014, in honour of the 100th anniversary of the birth of author Patrick O'Brian, BBC Radio 4 aired a 10-part adaptation of The Surgeon's Mate, with Benedict Cumberbatch as narrator. The series was first aired in 2004.
