= The Far Side of the World =

1984 novel by Patrick O'Brian

- First edition
- Author: Patrick O'Brian
- Cover artist: Arthur Barbosa
- Language: English
- Series: Aubrey-Maturin series
- Genre: Historical novel
- Publisher: Collins (UK)
- Publication date: 1984
- Publication place: United Kingdom
- Media type: Print (hardback and paperback) & Audio Book (Cassette, CD)
- Pages: 366 (paperback edition)
- ISBN: 000222711-8 first edition, hardback
- OCLC: 31704568
- Preceded by: Treason's Harbour
- Followed by: The Reverse of the Medal

The Far Side of the World is the tenth historical novel in the Aubrey-Maturin series by Patrick O'Brian, first published in 1984. The story is set during the Napoleonic Wars and the War of 1812.

The story from Treason's Harbour has several points resolved, as to the success of Maturin's work identifying the French spies, the trap that Aubrey sailed out of but HMS Pollux did not, and Aubrey resolving the tension between him and Lieutenant Fielding, who escaped the worst French prisoner-of-war facility. In Gibraltar, Captain Aubrey receives another mission, to sail HMS Surprise to protect British whalers in the Pacific Ocean from USS Norfolk, for his first voyage around Cape Horn. Dr Maturin has not yet identified the high-level spy who got away. Unaware, he sends the letter to his own wife explaining his protection of the Navy wife via that very villain.

== Plot summary ==
Aubrey meets Admiral Ives, now in Gibraltar, who is pleased with the last mission of HMS Surprise, despite Aubrey's negative report. Mr Yarrow will rephrase it to make the success clearer to the Admiralty. The admiral is now a peer, his deepest wish, and he is a happy man. Aubrey dines with Laura Fielding and her husband, Lieutenant Fielding, who is now satisfied that his wife is true to him and thanks Aubrey for bringing her from Malta to Gibraltar (though it is Maturin who brought her to the ship, saving her from two assassins). Maturin receives news from his intelligence-chief in London, Sir Joseph Blaine, confirming high level infiltration of British intelligence by the French. Maturin's wife Diana has heard rumours of his pretended infidelity in Valletta, Malta, with Mrs Fielding for intelligence reasons. He sends her a letter via Andrew Wray, unsuspecting of Wray's role as a French agent. Maturin learns of his success in Malta, destroying the French intelligence network based there, all but André Lesueur taken.

Surprise is not yet to be broken up; Admiral Ives sends Aubrey on a mission to protect British whalers in the Pacific Ocean from the frigate USS Norfolk, sailing on HMS Surprise on his first voyage around Cape Horn. Aubrey makes all haste to prepare his ship with men and supplies. He recruits Mr Allen, a new master with an in-depth knowledge of whalers, takes on Mr Martin as schoolmaster to the midshipmen, and Mr Hollom, an ageing midshipman, whom Aubrey wonders might be a Jonah.

The Surprise sails to the farthest east point of Brazil, where the bowsprit is burnt by lightning. During the repairs in Penedo, Pullings sees the USS Norfolk pass by. Mrs Horner, the gunner's wife, engages in an affair with Hollom, and becomes pregnant. Maturin will not interfere with the pregnancy, so she turns to his assistant, Higgins, who leaves her near death. Maturin saves her life. In the Atlantic, Surprise retakes the packet Danaë, with Lieutenant Lawrence in command. Tom Pullings sails the Danae back to England, after Maturin and Aubrey take possession of a hidden brass box, per instructions to Maturin. Surprise rounds Cape Horn with some losses, and then reaches the Juan Fernández Islands to refit and recover. There, the gunner kills his wife and Hollom, and re-boards the ship. Off Chile, Horner learns that Higgins performed an abortion on his wife; Higgins disappears from the ship and Horner hangs himself in his cabin. In the Pacific, with information from a Spanish merchantman, Surprise retakes the valuable whaler Acapulco with Caleb Gill in command, nephew to the Norfolk's captain. Mr Allen negotiates with the agent for the whaler in Valparaiso, where the American prisoners are left ashore. Taking the whaler restores the spirit to the crew.

Arrived at the Galapagos archipelago, Maturin and Martin are amazed at the new species they see on land, in the air and in the sea. Surprise picks up men from the whaler Intrepid Fox, now burnt by USS Norfolk. Knowing where the Norfolk is headed, Aubrey sails along the equator west toward the Marquesas. Maturin is disappointed and furious that the promise made to let him explore ashore is broken. Aubrey saves Maturin when he falls overboard one evening, but no one misses them until dawn. The two men are rescued by Polynesian women on a pahi, who ultimately leave them on a small island with a fishing line. The launch from the Surprise finds them. Maturin is needed aboard Surprise, as the group sent to board the pahi was cruelly beaten by the women.

After surviving the tail of a typhoon, the Surprise finds the Norfolk wrecked on a reef by the same typhoon and her survivors encamped on an island. Aubrey, Mr Martin and some of the crew take Maturin ashore for surgery; he is in a coma since hitting his head during the typhoon. Just as the surgeon from the Norfolk, Dr Butcher, prepares to operate, Maturin wakes from his coma. A heavy storm blows the Surprise away. Relations between the two marooned groups are tense, because some of the crew on the Norfolk were British mutineers and deserters in 1797 aboard HMS Hermione; they will be hanged for desertion and mutiny if they are returned to the Royal Navy. One admits this to Bonden. Aubrey tells the American Captain Palmer that he and his crew are now prisoners of war. Both groups are eager to leave this island. Aubrey orders his carpenters to lengthen the launch so they can sail away, pushing the rest to collect food. He sees an American whaler on the horizon. The crew of the Norfolk spot the same whaler, cheer at the sight, and then kill their informer. The Norfolks fight with the Surprises. Their cheering stops when the whaler loses two masts and strikes her colours, because it is the Surprise that takes her in chase.

== Characters ==
See also Recurring characters in the Aubrey–Maturin series

- Jack Aubrey: Captain of HMS Surprise.
- Stephen Maturin: ship's surgeon, friend to Jack, natural philosopher and an intelligence officer.
- Sophia Aubrey (née Williams): wife of Jack and mother of their three children. She was introduced in Post Captain.
- Diana Villiers Maturin: Wife of Stephen and first cousin to Sophia. Introduced in Post Captain.

At Gibraltar

- Admiral Sir Francis Ives KB: Commander-in-Chief of the Mediterranean Fleet, who receives a peerage in part on the successes of missions by HMS Surprise.
- Mr Yarrow: Secretary to Admiral Ives.
- Andrew Wray: Acting Second Secretary of the Admiralty, husband of Fanny Harte, come to the Mediterranean to investigate dockyard corruption. Wray is known to the reader – but not to Maturin – to be working as a spy for the French. Introduced in Desolation Island.
- William Sutton: Captain on his way to England to sit in Parliament and a lively guest at Aubrey's dinner with the Fieldings.
- Laura Fielding: Wife of Lieutenant Charles Fielding, used by the French to gather intelligence, then rescued by Maturin before they could dispose of her. Introduced in Treason's Harbour.

On HMS Surprise

- Mr Rowan: Former first lieutenant on HMS Surprise, sent to Malta with crucial message regarding events at Zambra in Treason's Harbour. Surprise was slow in reaching Gibraltar, yet Rowan did not return before her next mission from Gibraltar. Introduced in The Ionian Mission.
- Barret Bonden: Jack Aubrey's coxswain since Aubrey's first command. Introduced in Master and Commander.
- Preserved Killick: Jack Aubrey's shrewish steward on HMS Surprise. Introduced in Master and Commander.
- Mr Mowett: First lieutenant on HMS Surprise. Introduced in Master and Commander.
- Captain Pullings: He is a commander with no ship, so he volunteers on HMS Surprise, sharing duties with Mowett until they retake the packet ship Danae, when Pullings parts from Surprise to return Danae to England. Introduced in Master and Commander.
- Mr Honey: Acting third lieutenant on HMS Surprise, mentioned for promotion from master's mate.
- Mr Peter Calamy: Young midshipman taken on by Aubrey in Worcester and carried to Surprise, now 12 years old. He likes Maturin, and watches out for him. He lost his hair to scurvy rounding Cape Horn. Introduced in The Ionian Mission.
- Mr Williamson: Young midshipman taken by Aubrey in Worcester and carried to Surprise, where he lost half an arm in the battle with the Turkish ship Torgud. He loses some toes and tips of his ears to frostbite in the southern 60s (south latitude) rounding Cape Horn. Introduced in The Ionian Mission.
- John Nesbitt: One of the first-voyagers in midshipmen's berth who joined at Gibraltar. He broke his collar bone in storm in southern Atlantic
- Mr Blakeney: Signal midshipman on Juan Fernandez when sail is seen; he joined at Gibraltar.
- Mr Hollom: midshipman nearly 40 years old, rated master's mate but never a lieutenant, once on the Lively with Aubrey, now taken on HMS Surprise. Left to die with Mrs Horner, at Mr Horner's hand. He is the Jonah on the ship.
- Mr Borrell: Master gunner promoted out of HMS Surprise to HMS Burford.
- Mr Horner: New master gunner on HMS Surprise, who later kills himself.
- Mrs Horner: Young and attractive wife of the gunner, 19 years old. She helps with the young gentlemen until she is left at Juan Fernandez.
- Mr Gill: Master promoted out of HMS Surprise to the Burford.
- Mr Michael Allen: New master on HMS Surprise, a man with whaling experience and knowledge of the southern whaling waters. He sailed previously with James Colnett on a semi exploration-whaling expedition to the South Atlantic.
- Heneage Dundas: Captain of HMS Edinburgh based in Malta and a close friend to Aubrey. He connects Aubrey with Allen. Introduced in Master and Commander.
- Mr Martin: He is a Royal Navy chaplain, friend of Maturin and natural philosopher, now assigned to Surprise. He is schoolmaster to the many young midshipmen and assists in medical care. Introduced in The Ionian Mission.
- Higgins: Taken on at Gibraltar as assistant to Maturin for his skills in pulling teeth. He disappears off the ship after Mr Horner confronts him, knowing that Higgins "used an instrument" on his wife when she was pregnant.
- Joe Plaice: Elderly forecastle hand, cousin to Barret Bonden, who hits his head, and has the trepanning operation done by Maturin, with the flattened silver coin left to replace the bone removed.
- Padeen Colman: Huge, gentle Irish-speaking manservant chosen by Maturin in Gibraltar to serve on HMS Surprise.
- Lieutenant Lawrence: Prize captain from USS Norfolk, in his turn taken when HMS Surprise retook Danae in the Atlantic. He is a close relative of Captain James Lawrence, who visited Aubrey in Boston in Surgeon's Mate.
- Caleb Gill: American Captain on captured British whaler Acapulco, prisoner on Surprise. He is nephew to Captain Palmer of USS Norfolk. He is disappointed to be taking the prize home, as his real desire was to reach the Marquesa Islands, the paradise mentioned in the intercepted letter.
- Mr Hogg: Specksioneer from the whaler Intrepid Fox, who has sailed many times to the Marquesas and the Sandwich Islands, picked up at the Galapagos with five mates. He is useful in spotting the island where Aubrey and Maturin were left by the Polynesian women, and other situations.

On a coral island in the Pacific

- Captain Palmer: Captain of the USS Norfolk.
- Mr Butcher: surgeon of the American USS Norfolk, ready to operate on Maturin. Earlier he was on USS Constitution, one of several medical men deciding if Aubrey's injured arm could be saved (and it was saved), in Surgeon's Mate.
- Haines: Former British Navy sailor, part of 1797 mutiny, since moved to the US, on the USS Norfolk and an informer. His shipmates kill him.

== Ships ==
- British
  - HMS Surprise – 28 gun frigate
  - Danaë – packet ship
  - Acapulco – whaler
  - Amelia – whaler taken by USS Norfolk, loaded with oil from Intrepid Fox
  - Intrepid Fox – a whaler burned by the Norfolk
- Spanish
  - Estrella Polar – merchant ship
- American
  - USS Norfolk

== Series chronology ==
This novel references actual events with accurate historical detail, like all in this series. In respect to the internal chronology of the series, it is the fourth of eleven novels (beginning with The Surgeon's Mate) that might take five or six years to happen but are all pegged to an extended 1812, or as Patrick O'Brian says it, 1812a and 1812b (in the Author's Note for The Far Side of the World, the tenth novel in this series). The events of The Yellow Admiral again match up with the historical years of the Napoleonic wars in sequence, as the first six novels did.

== Reviews ==
Patrick Reardon, writing in the Chicago Tribune, reviewed this novel and the previous one, Treason's Harbour, as paired, one two-volume novel. He notes that "O`Brian writes about people, not characters." Though there is action, there are battles, the author gives the reader "the everyday meat of life, about emotions that are deep and complex, and are more important than the plot," and he "writes historical novels without the swashbuckling."

== Historical references ==
In the Author's Note, O'Brian says that USS Norfolk is a reference to the historical expedition of USS Essex. Essex sailed in South Atlantic waters and along the coast of Brazil until January 1813 when Captain David Porter undertook commerce raiding against British whaling fisheries in the Pacific. Although her voyage was hampered from a shortage of provisions and heavy gales while rounding Cape Horn, she anchored safely at Valparaíso, Chile, on 14 March, having seized schooners Elizabeth and Nereyda along the way. The next five months brought Essex 13 prizes.

Porter sailed into the harbour of Valparaíso to avoid a British force of a frigate and a brig-sloop waiting for him outside of the harbour. On 28 March 1814, Porter sailed out of the harbour, but upon sighting British forces began to retreat back into the harbour. He was easily defeated by the opposing captain, James Hillyar. In his final report, David Porter claimed that the British had violated neutrality, conducted themselves dishonorably and inhumanely, and plundered his personal property after the engagement. He stated that the loss of Essex was simply due to a series of misfortunes and blamed Paul Hamilton for his all short range carronade armament. He wrote to Secretary Jones "I hope, Sir, that our conduct may prove satisfactory to our country." Porter finally claimed that the United States had the right to reclaim Essex from the British. The only viable parts of Porter's report was that Essex was only armed with short-range carronades and that he had lost his top-mast. The British had not violated neutrality, conducted themselves dishonorably, nor plundered his personal belongings. There were no further misfortunes aboard Essex. In fact, the entire engagement was caused by Porter's attempt to achieve personal glory by defeating the British rather than following his orders not to engage them. Porter could have very well not returned to Valparaíso where he would be blockaded, as he knew Phoebe and Cherub would arrive. The United States by no means had any right to reclaim Essex given the circumstances of the battle.

In contrast, Hillyar praised Porter for good conduct and claimed he only surrendered when all his options were expended. Hillyar found Essex with provisions for a six-month cruise. He moved all the ships to Valparaíso and transferred the prisoners to a Spanish prison hulk. On 2 April 1814, Hillyar repaired shot holes below Pheobe's waterline. On 13 April Tagus and Nereus arrived. On 26 April the prisoners were moved to Essex Junior and ferried them away. Hillyar would help reconcile the Peruvian and Chilean governments which the British gave more attention to as the War of the Sixth Coalition had ended and Napoleon was exiled.

The famous author Herman Melville criticized Porter's refusal to strike his colors when it became clear that the situation was hopeless, instead of seeking to "crown himself with the glory of the shambles, by permitting his hopeless crew to be butchered before his eyes." "Nor, by thus continuing to fight, did this American frigate, one iota, promote the true interests of her country."

== Film adaptation ==
The novel provided part of the title and some of the plot-structure for the 2003 Peter Weir film, Master and Commander: The Far Side of the World. The fictional USS Norfolk morphed into the fictional American-built French privateer Acheron, and episodes also migrated from other books in the series, including Master and Commander and HMS Surprise. The design and size of the fictional Acheron reflect those of the USS Constitution.

In reviewing the film, Christopher Hitchens commented on the action scenes from this novel that were depicted in the film. He finds "the summa of O'Brian's genius was the invention of Dr. Stephen Maturin. He is the ship's gifted surgeon, but he is also a scientist, an espionage agent for the Admiralty, a man of part Irish and part Catalan birth—and a revolutionary. He joins the British side, having earlier fought against it, because of his hatred for Bonaparte's betrayal of the principles of 1789—principles that are perfectly obscure to bluff Capt. Jack Aubrey. Any cinematic adaptation of O'Brian must stand or fall by its success in representing this figure. On this the film doesn't even fall, let alone stand. It skips the whole project." He finds the action scenes more inspirational: "In one respect the action lives up to its fictional and actual inspiration. This was the age of Bligh and Cook and of voyages of discovery as well as conquest, and when HMS Surprise makes landfall in the Galapagos Islands we get a beautifully filmed sequence about how the dawn of scientific enlightenment might have felt."

== Publication history ==
- Collins hardback first edition 1984 ISBN 0002227118
- Fontana Paperback edition 1985
- W. W. Norton & Company Reprint Paperback edition 1992 ISBN 0393308626
- Books on Tape Audio edition 1993 ISBN 5555768079
- HarperCollins Paperback edition 1994
- W. W. Norton & Company Reprint Hardcover edition 1994 ISBN 039303710X
- HarperCollins B-format paperback edition 1997
- Thorndike Press Large-print Hardcover edition 2002 ISBN 0754017834
- Thorndike Press Large-print Paperback edition 2002 ISBN 0754091759
- HarperCollins Paperback edition 2003
- W. W. Norton & Company Reissue (movie tie-in) Paperback edition 2003 ISBN 0393324761
- Soundings Ltd Audio CD Edition 2003 ISBN 1842832689
- Recorded Books, LLC Audio edition narrated by Patrick Tull ISBN 1402591764
- W. W. Norton & Company e-book edition 2011 ISBN 9780393063820

The books in this series by Patrick O'Brian were re-issued in the US by W. W. Norton & Co. in 1992, after a re-discovery of the author and this series by Norton, finding a new audience for the entire series. Norton issued The Far Side of the World eight years after its initial publication, as a paperback in 1992. Ironically, it was a US publisher, J. B. Lippincott & Co., who asked O'Brian to write the first book in the series, Master and Commander published in 1969. Collins picked it up in the UK in 1970, and continued to publish each novel as O'Brian completed another story. Beginning with The Nutmeg of Consolation in 1991, the novels were released at about the same time in the USA (by W. W. Norton) and the UK (by HarperCollins, the name of Collins after a merger).

Novels prior to 1992 were published rapidly in the US for that new market. Following novels were released at the same time by the UK and US publishers. Collins asked Geoff Hunt in 1988 to do the cover art for the twelve books published by then, with The Letter of Marque being the first book to have Hunt's work on the first edition. He continued to paint the covers for future books; the covers were used on both USA and UK editions. Reissues of earlier novels used the Geoff Hunt covers.

== External sources ==
- Maps for The Far Side of the World
