= Treason's Harbour =

1983 novel by Patrick O'Brian

- First edition cover
- Author: Patrick O'Brian
- Language: English
- Series: Aubrey-Maturin series
- Genre: Historical novel
- Publisher: Collins (UK)
- Publication date: 1983
- Publication place: United Kingdom
- Media type: Print (Hardback & Paperback) & Audio Book (Compact audio cassette, Compact Disc)
- Pages: 408 paperback edition
- ISBN: 0-00-222169-1 first edition; hardback
- OCLC: 31989694
- LC Class: PR6029.O55
- Preceded by: The Ionian Mission
- Followed by: The Far Side of the World

Treason's Harbour is the ninth historical novel in the Aubrey-Maturin series by British author Patrick O'Brian, first published in 1983. The story is set during the Napoleonic Wars.

While with Captain Jack Aubrey awaiting repairs on his ship in Malta, Stephen Maturin discovers that the island is home to a ruthless network of French spies. An unwilling French informer needs help from Maturin, who discovers her predicament and helps her. Meanwhile, a new Admiral arrives at Malta. He sends Aubrey on three missions across the Mediterranean to the Red Sea, one on borrowed ships, and two of the missions are traps. Aubrey escapes the predicaments, but Admiral Harte dies when his ship of the line is destroyed in an ambush. The high level double agent whose existence Maturin begins to suspect does not succeed in undoing either Maturin or Aubrey, yet.

After the reissue of the novel in 1992, it received strong praise. In mentioning the dramatic fate of Mr Hairabedian, one reviewer wryly states that nothing happens in the novel, but the novels are "filled with real people doing real things, brilliantly imagined and conveyed in crisp, clear, strong writing."

== Plot summary ==
The Surprises wait at Malta while their ship is slowly repaired after their successful mission on the Ionian coast. Aubrey and Maturin meet Mrs Laura Fielding at music parties she holds. She is waiting for news of her husband, a naval lieutenant who is a prisoner-of-war in France. One of the three groups of French intelligence agents in Malta uses Fielding's plight to manipulate her into spying for them. Aubrey saves her huge dog Ponto from a fall in the cistern. This endears Aubrey to Ponto, leading the gossips of Malta to assume he is carrying on an affair with Mrs Fielding. She asks Maturin to help her satisfy the French agents. They let it appear to the French spies as if they are conducting an affair, and Maturin prepares false materials for her to pass on. The new Commander of the Mediterranean fleet, Admiral Sir Francis Ives and acting second secretary Andrew Wray, arrive in Malta with their own advisor on Turkish affairs. Once Aubrey learns that an earlier prize was accepted by the board, he has money to speed up repairs on Surprise. Before he leaves Malta, Graham describes Lesueur, a French agent known to him. Unbeknownst to Maturin, Wray meets with Lesueur, receives payments from him and learns what Maturin has done to French spies. Maturin is delighted to receive his diving bell, built on Edmond Halley's design. He and Heneage Dundas test it out from Dundas’s ship. It travels with Maturin on the next mission.

Aubrey is dispatched on a secret mission by Admiral Ives to capture a Turkish galley laden with French silver in the Red Sea. They sail on the Dromedary to Tina, and then walk across the Sinai Peninsula to meet the HEI ship Niobe at Suez. Aubrey takes command of Niobe in the Red Sea, with Turkish troops to aid on land. They spot the galley and give chase. Aubrey notices that the galley is using a drag sail to artificially slow its speed. Realizing the trickery, Aubrey sinks the galley to deny the French its silver. Maturin and Aubrey use the diving bell to retrieve the cargo, but find it is lead not silver, a complete trap. The galley had been in the sea for a month awaiting them, to lure them under French cannons on land. They reverse the challenging journey, offloading the disappointed Turkish troops at Suez, then cross the desert with no escort. Bedouin horsemen steal their camel train, so they reach Tina exhausted. Only Aubrey’s chest, with his chelengk award and the dead dragoman’s papers, is saved by Killick’s diligent effort. They return to Malta on Dromedary.

Admiral Ives tells Aubrey the sad news that Surprise is to return to England to be sold out of the service. Maturin is in a mood to gamble at cards. Wray loses a large sum of money to Maturin playing piquet, and is unable to pay his debt. Maturin asks for naval favours in return, like a ship for recently-promoted Pullings. Before dispatching Surprise to England, Ives asks Aubrey to take the Adriatic convoy up to Trieste, where he meets Captain Cotton of HMS Nymphe. Nymphe has just rescued the escaped prisoner-of-war, Lieutenant Charles Fielding. Maturin removes a bullet from the brave and jealous man. He hears the rumour of Aubrey's liaison with his wife and refuses to return to Malta on Surprise, challenging Aubrey to a duel when they next meet on land. On the return journey Captain Dundas, on HMS Edinburgh, tells Aubrey of a French privateer, which Aubrey then captures with Dryad in convoy. The chase delays Surprise into Malta, so the news of Lieutenant Fielding's rescue has begun to circulate. Maturin speeds to Mrs Fielding's house, but she is not home. Lesueur and Boulay, a double agent on the Governor's staff, arrive to kill her, as she is of no more use to them, and have already killed Ponto. Maturin quietly listens to their conversation until they leave. When she arrives, he takes her aboard the Surprise, saving her life.

Admiral Ives orders Aubrey to sail to Zambra on the Barbary Coast to persuade the Dey of Mascara not to molest British ships, in convoy with HMS Pollux, which is returning Admiral Harte to England. While Pollux waits at the entrance of the Bay of Zambra, the French Mars with two frigates fire on her, with a fierce ensuing battle. Pollux blows up, killing all 500 aboard, but not before she severely damages Mars. The two frigates chase Surprise deep into the bay until the heavier frigate runs aground on a reef. Her smaller consort deserts the fight. On the political advice of Maturin, Aubrey sets sail for Gibraltar. This ambush on a voyage known to so few makes it clear that someone highly placed in the British command betrayed them to the French. Maturin hopes Wray will find the traitor out and destroy the French spy networks.

== Characters ==
See also Recurring characters in the Aubrey–Maturin series

- Jack Aubrey: Captain of HMS Surprise, in Malta for repairs. He sails the East India Company sloop Niobe in the Red Sea.
- Stephen Maturin: Ship's surgeon, friend to Jack Aubrey, natural philosopher and an intelligence officer.
- Sophia Aubrey: Wife of Jack Aubrey and mother of their three children. Introduced in Post Captain.
- Diana Villiers Maturin: Wife of Stephen and first cousin to Sophia. Introduced in Post Captain.

Aboard HMS Surprise or Dromedary

- Preserved Killick: Steward to Aubrey. Introduced in Master and Commander.
- Barret Bonden: Coxswain to Aubrey. Introduced in Master and Commander.
- William Mowett: First lieutenant under Aubrey, now that Pullings is promoted. Introduced in Master and Commander.
- Rowan: Second lieutenant under Aubrey, now that Pullings is promoted. Introduced in The Ionian Mission.
- Mr Peter Calamy: Young midshipman taken on by Aubrey in Worcester and carried to Surprise. He likes Maturin and is part of the mission to the Red Sea. Introduced in The Ionian Mission.
- Mr Williamson: Young midshipman taken by Aubrey in Worcester and carried to Surprise, where he lost half an arm in the battle with the Turkish ship Torgud. Part of the mission to the Red Sea. Introduced in The Ionian Mission.
- Mr Honey: Midshipman (master's mate) under Aubrey with enough years of service to take the examination for lieutenant.
- Mr Maitland: Midshipman (master's mate) under Aubrey with enough years of service to take the examination for lieutenant.
- Mr Gill: Master of the Surprise, good at laying a course, but a "melancholy, withdrawn, puritanical" man.
- Faster Doudle: Foremast hand. Mentioned in The Fortune of War.
- Davis: Foremast hand, very strong but often awkward; he follows Aubrey from ship to ship, on account of Aubrey once saving his life from drowning.
- Mr Nathaniel Martin: Parson from HMS Berwick on leave in Malta, who stays too long on the troop ship with Maturin, thus joins Surprise crew as an assistant to Maturin for the Red Sea mission. He is a natural philosopher. Introduced in The Ionian Mission.
- Mr Hairabedian: Genial Turkish dragoman appointed by the Admiral to accompany Aubrey on the Red Sea mission. He likes to swim from the ship; when he does so in the Red Sea, a shark finds him, shocking even the seamen.
- Major Pollock: Soldier aboard Surprise at her second visit to Kutali, now an English base, with the Adriatic convoy. He reveals to Aubrey that HMS Blackwater is sailing under another captain. (The ship had long been promised to Aubrey.)

In Malta

- Tom Pullings: Promoted to commander in the Royal Navy on account of the success against two Turkish ships in The Ionian Mission. He is not assigned a ship, but is very happy despite the cruel scars he sustained in the boarding. Introduced in Master and Commander.
- Mrs Laura Fielding: Young, pretty Neopolitan woman, wife of Charles, a prisoner of war to the French; she was pressed to spy for the French in hopes of his release.
- Ponto: Mrs Fielding's huge Illyrian mastiff in Malta, so friendly to Aubrey for pulling him out of a well, that Malta gossips invent another story to account for the friendliness. Dies by poison from a French spy.
- Andrew Wray: Acting Second Secretary of the Admiralty, husband of Fanny Harte, come to Malta to investigate dockyard corruption. Maturin observes that, although married, Wray is likely a pederast. Introduced in Desolation Island.
- André Lesueur: A French intelligence agent posing as a wealthy merchant on Malta.
- Giuseppe: One of Lesueur's agents.
- Admiral Sir Francis Ives KB: Commander-in-Chief of the Mediterranean Fleet, replacing the late Admiral Thornton in naval and diplomatic matters.
- Admiral Harte: Second-in-Command of the Mediterranean Fleet, father-in-law to Andrew Wray, and recently a wealthy man by an inheritance. He is sent home to England aboard Pollux in company with Surprise. When Pollux explodes in the ambush, he dies at age 67 with all hands. Introduced in Master and Commander.
- Sir Hildebrand: British Governor of Malta.
- Boulay: Works in Sir Hildebrand's staff, a double agent. He is from the Channel Islands.
- Admiral Hartley: Aubrey's former Admiral in the West Indies, now retired in Malta.
- Ebenezer Graham: Professor, expert on Turkish affairs and language, a diplomat and spy in the British service. Introduced in The Ionian Mission.
- Mr Figgins Pocock: Assistant to the new Admiral on Turkish affairs, pushing Graham back to England.

Met at sea

- Henry Cotton: Once a midshipman with Jack on the Resolution, he is now captain of the Nymphe.
- Charles Fielding: Prisoner-of-war in the worst French prison Bitche, husband of Laura, and lieutenant in the Royal Navy. He escapes Bitche and is rescued by HMS Nymphe.
- Heneage Dundas: Captain based in Malta and a close friend to Aubrey. He and Maturin are the first to use the diving bell, off Dundas's ship Edinburgh. Introduced in Master and Commander.
- William Babbington: Captain of the Dryad, sailing in company with Surprise back from the Adriatic Sea. Introduced in Master and Commander
- Dawson: Captain of HMS Pollux, who dies along with all aboard his ship along the Barbary Coast.

== Ships ==
- British
  - HMS Surprise – frigate
  - HMS Worcester (condemned to be a sheer hulk)
  - HMS Dromedary
  - HMS Edinburgh
  - HMS Pollux
  - HMS Nymphe
  - HMS Dryad
  - Store-ship Tortoise
  - HEI sloop Niobe
- French
  - Mars 80 gun ship of the line
  - 38 and 28 gun Zealous and Spitfire (named in The Far Side of the World)

== Series chronology ==
This novel references actual events with accurate historical detail, like all in this series. In respect to the internal chronology of the series, it is the third of eleven novels (beginning with The Surgeon's Mate) that might take five or six years to happen but are all pegged to an extended 1812, or as Patrick O'Brian says it, 1812a and 1812b (introduction to The Far Side of the World, the tenth novel in this series). The events of The Yellow Admiral again match up with the historical years of the Napoleonic wars in sequence, as the first six novels did.

== Title ==
The title is drawn from a line in Shakespeare's play, Henry VI: 'Smoothe runnes the Water, where the Brooke is deepe. And in his simple shew he harbours Treason.' (It is also written: Smooth runs the water where the brook is deep / And in his simple show he harbours treason.) 2 Henry VI, a speech by Suffolk.

== Reviews ==
Patrick Reardon, writing in the Chicago Tribune when the paperback was issued in the US, mentions the incident of Mr Hairabedian's abrupt demise. In assessing that shocking scene and the crew's reaction to it, Reardon says that "Not much happens in O`Brian`s books, not much, that is, in the sense of battles and great drama. But his novels are filled with real people doing real things, brilliantly imagined and conveyed in crisp, clear, strong writing."

Publishers Weekly, reviewing an inadequate audio book narrator, commends the series in the highest terms, and is sharply critical of the narrator's inability to properly convey the main characters. They said of the series and the novel "what is certainly the greatest series about the British Navy ever written--indeed, one of the most successful of its magnitude ever written in any genre". Of the reader of this audio book, they said "Royal Shakespeare Company and National Theatre actor Pigott-Smith has an appropriately English accent, but his characters' voices lack consistency and sensitivity to the subtleties of O'Brian's pen.", a rather sharp criticism. Further, readers of this series "will despair at hearing how this production tramples upon his genius in portraying shockingly real characters in an utterly foreign, far-off time."

== Narrative style ==
Most of the novels in the series tell the story exclusively from the point of view of Maturin or Aubrey, either through descriptions through their eyes, direct conversations, their internal thoughts, or their letters and diary entries. In essence, the reader usually knows only what one or both of the two main characters know.

In Treason’s Harbour, however, O'Brian tells some of the story through conversations between the French agent Lesueur and Andrew Wray or other confederates in Malta, conversations that the protagonists neither hear nor overhear. Thus from the opening pages of the novel, the reader is aware that Wray, the acting second secretary of the British Admiralty, is secretly accepting money and taking orders from France. When Aubrey's mission to the Red Sea is a total failure, and again when Aubrey, Maturin, and Admiral Harte are sent on a suicide mission to the Barbary Coast, Aubrey begins to quietly doubt his luck, but the reader knows that he has been a victim of Wray's plots.

As the plot unfolds, Maturin gradually realises that there must be a traitor in the upper echelons of the British Admiralty. But again unlike the reader, he does not know the traitor's identity as the novel comes to a close. In fact, one of his last actions in the book is to write a letter to Wray detailing his suspicions and describing the French spy network in Malta.

== Publication history ==
- 1983 UK Collins hardback first edition ISBN 0-00-222169-1
- 1984, April UK Fontana paperback ISBN 978-0-00-616815-7
- 1992 USA W W Norton & Company paperback ISBN 978-0-393-30863-1
- 1997, March UK, HarperCollins paperback ISBN 978-0-00-649923-7
- 2003, July USA Chivers Windsor Paragon & Co large print paperback ISBN 978-0-7540-9148-6
- 2007 UK HarperCollins paperback ISBN 978-0-00-725591-7
- 2011, December USA W W Norton & Company e-book ISBN 978-0-393-06381-3

The books in this series by Patrick O'Brian were re-issued in the US by W. W. Norton & Co. in 1992, after a re-discovery of the author and this series by Norton, finding a new audience for the entire series. Norton issued Treason's Harbour nine years after its initial publication, as a paperback in 1992. Ironically, it was a US publisher, J. B. Lippincott & Co., who asked O'Brian to write the first book in the series, Master and Commander published in 1969. Collins picked it up in the UK, and continued to publish each novel as O'Brian completed another story. Beginning with The Nutmeg of Consolation in 1991, the novels were released at about the same time in the USA (by W W Norton) and the UK (by HarperCollins, the name of Collins after a merger).

Novels prior to 1992 were published rapidly in the US for that new market. Following novels were released at the same time by the UK and US publishers. Collins asked Geoff Hunt in 1988 to illustrate the covers of the twelve books already published by then, with The Letter of Marque being the first book to have Hunt's work on the first edition. He continued to paint the covers for future books; the covers were used on both USA and UK editions. Reissues of earlier novels used the Geoff Hunt covers.

== External sources ==
- "Treason's Harbour". W W Norton catalogue.
- Maps for Treason's Harbour
- Geoff Hunt Covers for all books in the series
