= The Ionian Mission =

1981 novel by Patrick O'Brian

- First edition cover
- Author: Patrick O'Brian
- Language: English
- Series: Aubrey-Maturin series
- Genre: Historical novel
- Published: 1981 Collins (UK)
- Publication place: United Kingdom
- Media type: Print (Hardback & Paperback) & Audio Book (Cassette, CD)
- Pages: 368 first edition, hardback
- ISBN: 0-00-222365-1 first edition, hardback
- OCLC: 31728418
- Preceded by: The Surgeon's Mate
- Followed by: Treason's Harbour

The Ionian Mission is the eighth historical novel in the Aubrey-Maturin series by Patrick O'Brian, first published in 1981. The story is set during the Napoleonic Wars.

The plot begins with the marriage of Dr Maturin and Diana Villiers. Soon after, Captain Aubrey takes HMS Worcester on blockade duty around Toulon, France, until the ship is sent for refitting. With Worcester refitting, he is reassigned to HMS Surprise on which he, Maturin and Professor Graham seek a new ally among the pashas on the coast of the Ionian Sea.

In reviews at the time of the 1991-92 reissue of this novel, one reviewer described Maturin's "hair-raising infiltration of the enemy coast" and then the mission of the title by Aubrey and Maturin, "to the Greek islands to tinker with the balance of power at the fringes of the Turkish empire", summing it up as "splendid adventures at a stately pace". Another finds that time aboard the old ship Worcester has little excitement, while tension rises when "Aubrey is caught in a complex net of Turkish politics and rivalries", in which the fleet Admiral would be just as happy if Aubrey failed.

== Plot summary ==
Stephen Maturin and Diana Villiers have found domestic tranquility in their marriage. Though they share a new house in London on Half Moon Street, Stephen's intelligence work demands privacy, so he settles in his rooms at The Grapes, where Diana comes often, and from which he walks to breakfast with her daily. Meanwhile, Jack Aubrey longs to get away from his ongoing lawsuit. Jack is given command of HMS Worcester for blockade duty off the French coast near Toulon. Jagiello brings the Maturins to port in his own carriage, which upsets, making Stephen's arrival rather last-minute.

While she is doing gunnery practice with gunpowder bought from a fireworks firm, Worcester encounters the French ship Jemmapes. Worcester engages immediately, not having changed to ordinary gunpowder; the brightly coloured flashes from her guns convince the enemy she is carrying some new weapon, and Jemmapes sails away. Stephen is injured and returns to taking laudanum for the pain. Some of the crew practice an oratorio while the midshipmen practice Hamlet. Passengers are dropped off at Gibraltar and Port Mahon, including a Mr Graham, professor of moral philosophy, though the parson Nathaniel Martin is aboard long enough for Stephen to discover their shared interest in birds, before Martin joins HMS Berwick. Worcester joins the squadron off Toulon. Babbington, master and commander, joins the Mediterranean squadron as captain of the Dryad. Babbington has fallen in love with Admiral Harte's daughter Fanny, but her father wants her to marry the wealthy Andrew Wray. Babbington figures that Wray and Harte have conspired to assign him to blockade duty. Before Dryad, the Worcesters see HMS Surprise arrive with mail for the fleet.

Admiral Thornton, commander of the blockade, is wasting away with the endless responsibilities of managing the complex political situation on the Mediterranean station. He has repeatedly refused reassignment, however, and Jack and Stephen suspect that engaging the French in a decisive fleet action may be his only hope of recovery. Thornton's second-in-command, Harte, has lesser goals. While Thornton is away, Harte passes instructions to Aubrey and Babbington regarding a mission to the neutral port of Medina on the north coast of Africa, with strict orders that they not upset the delicate political circumstances by engaging in any action that might be construed as aggressive, lest the local authorities find reason to side with the French.

Arriving off Medina, Dryad sees French ships already anchored in the port and rejoins Worcester. Jack enters the neutral port in an attempt to draw French fire, but a tense, silent standoff ensues as the French similarly refuse to engage first, and Jack leaves without a shot having been fired. His crew is disappointed and he feels his reputation as a fighting captain is tarnished. Rejoining the fleet, Jack is reprimanded by Thornton and Harte for failing to capture Medina: it is revealed that Thornton had intended to deliberately allow Dryad to be captured by the French in order to create a pretext upon which Aubrey could attack the port. Jack realises that Harte, who has long disliked him, intentionally left this out of his orders in the hope that he and Babbington would botch the mission. Fortunately, he had the foresight to request Harte's orders in writing, so Thornton chalks it up to a miscommunication and returns Jack to the blockade.

Worcester then brings Maturin to the coast of France under the cover of night for a rendezvous with other agents. Shots suddenly ring out in the darkness, persuading Stephen to abandon the rendezvous. Waiting for the launch, he discovers Professor Graham, also working as a British agent, who has attempted his own rendezvous the same night and accidentally shot himself in the foot. Graham is rescued and handed over to the Captain of the Fleet to act as a Turkish advisor. Later, a storm blows the British ships off station and the French fleet slips the blockade. Admiral Thornton is pleased, but the winds change, preventing a successful engagement. The French admiral Emeriau declines battle and returns to Toulon. A few shots are exchanged, killing the captain and first lieutenant of HMS Surprise, and the Worcester, a poorly built ship, is strained beyond usefulness during the chase. Thornton tells Jack to take her to Malta to refit, then shift part of his crew to the Surprise for a mission to the Seven Islands on the Ionian coast.

As they sail, a poetry contest is set up, with Mowett and Rowan splitting the prize. The Surprise takes the blockade runner Bonhomme Richard, filled with spices, dyes, and heaps of silver. The silver is shared out at once, and Rowan takes the prize to Malta. Kutali, a (fictional) port in the Seven Islands, is disputed by three beys of the Ottoman Empire, each of whom rules semi-autonomously and plots against the others to further his own ambitions and curry favour with the Sultan. In exchange for British cannon, all three have offered to help the Royal Navy capture the neighbouring city of Marga and possibly also Corfu, if not more of the islands, from the French. Jack's mission is to visit each of the three beys in turn, Ismail, Mustapha, and Sciahan, and offer British support to whichever one seems the most dependable ally.

Ismail and Mustapha prove duplicitous and temperamental, while Sciahan already in fact possesses Kutali and the loyalty of its Christian population and impresses Jack mightily. Though the strength of Kutali's fortifications has been greatly exaggerated, it is at least well suited to naval operations. When Jack sends Dryad to fetch the gun-laden transports and escort them back to Sciahan, Graham is furious and rebukes Jack for ignoring his counsel, which might have allowed them to negotiate better terms. Surprise lingers at Kutali, being windbound, and the transports seem long in coming. Rumour spreads that Ismail has been awarded control of Kutali by the Sultan himself, and the locals beg Aubrey to protect them. Graham travels by land to Ali Pasha of Ioannina, where he learns the rumour is false: Ali Pasha, in his own double dealing, has spread the lie to provoke the short-tempered Mustapha against his enemy Ismail, hoping the Sultan will turn against the renegade Mustapha. The ruse has worked, and Mustapha has put to sea and captured the gun transports en route to Kutali. Surprise is ready to sail on the instant, as the winds have changed.

Jack quickly intercepts Mustapha's heavily armed ships, Torgud and Kitabi, with Surprise firing broadsides instantly and repeatedly. Torgud is cruelly damaged, with many dead. Young Williamson loses half his arm. Kitabi attempts to manoeuvre between Surprise and Torgud but crashes into Torgud's side. Jack and his crew board Kitabi and take her, then proceed to Torgud. Tom Pullings falls in the melee, so Jack stands above him and fights in the close hand-to-hand combat. Jack finally reaches Mustapha, who was wounded early in the action. His aide Ulusan surrenders. Bonden carries the swords and ensigns. Aubrey asks Mowett what happened to Pullings and is happy to learn he survived. They return to the Surprise before the Torgud sinks.

== Characters ==
See also Recurring characters in the Aubrey–Maturin series

- Jack Aubrey: Captain of HMS Worcester on blockade duty at Toulon. Then he is captain of HMS Surprise, sent on a mission in the Ionian Sea.
- Stephen Maturin: Ship's surgeon, natural philosopher, friend to Aubrey and an intelligence officer.
- Sophia Aubrey: Jack's wife and mother of their three children.
- Mrs Williams: Sophia's mother.
- Diana Villiers Maturin: Cousin to Sophia and wife of Maturin.
- Gedymin Jagiello: Young handsome Lithuanian cavalry officer, now in London attached to the Swedish embassy. He was prisoner of war with Aubrey and Maturin in Paris, and is now good friends with them in England. He is a frequent guest at the house on Half Moon Street, where Diana Villiers hosts social events; introduced in The Surgeon's Mate.
- General Aubrey: Father of Jack Aubrey, now holds two seats in Parliament, speaking often in the Radical interest, making his son's career more difficult.

On Surprise or met at sea

- Tom Pullings: First lieutenant of HMS Worcester, capable man. He was a master's mate under Aubrey in his first command, introduced in Master and Commander.
- William Mowett: Second lieutenant of HMS Worcester and a poet. He was master's mate under Aubrey in his first command, introduced in Master and Commander.
- Somers: Drunken aristocratic third lieutenant of HMS Worcester, a poor seaman who exchanged for Mr Rowan.
- Rowan: Third lieutenant of HMS Worcester, and a poet in competing style to Mowett.
- Preserved Killick: Steward for Aubrey, who also looks after Maturin, as to his dress.
- Barret Bonden: Coxswain for Aubrey, who is usually sent when there is need to fetch Maturin from an unlikely coast or port.
- Mr Peter Calamy: "Squeaker" midshipman, first time at sea, son of a late shipmate, taken on by Aubrey in Worcester and carried to Surprise.
- Mr Williamson: "Squeaker" midshipman, first time at sea, son of Dick Williamson, and like Calamy, taken by Aubrey in Worcester and carried to Surprise, where he loses half an arm in the battle.
- Davis: Man whose life Aubrey once saved from drowning, who presents himself aboard the Worcester, come from Niobe. He is rough but very strong and a good hand in boarding, which he does in the end, aboard HMS Surprise.
- Joseph Plaice: Cousin to Bonden and forecastle-hand in Worcester and Surprise, long time shipmate to Aubrey and Maturin.
- Thornton: Commander-in-Chief of the Mediterranean Fleet, Admiral of the white, who appears to be based on Admiral Collingwood, is wearing out from the work and anxious for a fleet action. He is a skilled seaman, but also holds the threads of diplomacy with all the states and nations along the Mediterranean coast.
- Harte: Second-in-Command, Rear Admiral of the red, who has a long history of disliking Aubrey, and is far less skilled than Thornton. He was introduced in Master and Commander.
- Mitchell: Rear Admiral of the blue and commander of the inshore squadron; reached his position from the ranks of the foredeck.
- Heneage Dundas: Captain of HMS Excellent in the Toulon squadron and a close friend to Aubrey, introduced in Master and Commander.
- William Babbington: Commander who is Captain of HMS Dryad and a former midshipman under Aubrey in his first command, along with Pullings and Mowett. He was introduced in Master and Commander.
- Fanny Harte: Daughter of Admiral Harte, and the true love of Babbington. Her father chooses another husband for her, Andrew Wray.
- Andrew Wray: Acting second secretary of the Navy, considered a "scrub" by Diana Villiers from social encounters, and called out as a cheat at cards with Aubrey; introduced in Desolation Island.
- Ebenezer Graham: Professor of moral philosophy, a passenger out to Port Mahon, who proves to be a spy for Britain in a group conflicting with the one that includes Maturin. He is an expert on Turkish politics and language.
- Mr Nathaniel Martin: Impoverished parson and lover of birds; he lost an eye to an owl. He is delighted to have the regular pay and meals of a parson in the Royal Navy, but shocked at the results of a court martial. He waits on Worcestor until HMS Berwick joins the squadron.
- Dr Harrington: Physician of the Fleet who, along with Maturin, tends to Admiral Thornton.
- Harry Bennet: Captain of HMS Berwick, delaying in Palermo on account of red-haired lady.

The Ionian Sea

- Mr Patterson: Lieutenant in charge of the transport Polyphemus, part of the squadron to Barka and Medina, carrying a rhinoceros among other gifts meant for the Pasha of Barka, and the consul Hamilton,.
- Ismail: One of the three beys that Aubrey interviews, to select one as an ally to Britain in gaining a base and then at least one of the Seven Islands in the Ionian Sea. He is ruler of Mesenteron (a fictitious place). The British embassy prefers him.
- Mustapha: One of the three beys that Aubrey interviews. He is ruler of Karia (a fictitious place) and a Capitan-Bey, Turkish for leader of the navy in that area. The Commander-in-Chief knows him and leans toward him.
- Father Andros: First emissary of Sciahan to Aubrey and the religious leader of the Christians in the Greek upper town of Kutali.
- Sciahan Bey: One of the three beys that Aubrey interviews, to select one as an ally to Britain. He is in Kutali, the place Britain would like to use as a base. Aubrey supports him.

== Ships ==
- British
  - HMS Worcester
  - HMS Ocean
  - HMS Surprise
  - HMS Excellent
  - HMS Berwick
  - HMS San Josef
  - HMS Pomone
  - HMS Renown
  - HMS Orion
  - HMS Dryad
- French
  - Bonhomme Richard privateer and blockade runner
  - Jemmapes
  - Archimède
  - Junon
  - Robuste
  - Borée
  - Lion
- Turkish
  - Torgud 32-gun
  - Kitabi 20-gun

== Allusions to real events ==
On 5 and 6 July 1808 the 38-gun British frigate HMS Seahorse, Captain John Stewart, fought an action against the much larger Turkish frigate Badere Zaffer (of 52 guns), Captain Scanderli Kichuc Alli, and an accompanying Turkish corvette, the Alis Fezzan. After a long and bloody action the Turkish frigate surrendered when her obstinate captain was overpowered by his remaining officers. The damaged Alis Fezzan escaped during the night. Of particular relevance to the plot of the Ionian Mission is that the Turkish frigate was armed with brass 24-pounder long guns and two immense 42-pounders (the nearest British gun equivalent for the French 36-pounder - French pounds were heavier than British pounds).

In the engagement with the two Turkish ships, Aubrey first boarded the Kitabi, which surrendered, then jumped across to the nearby Torgud. One of his men said he had boarded like Nelson, referring to Horatio Nelson at the battle of St. Vincent, who took two Spanish ships, jumping from the San Nicolas to the San Josef. Jack Aubrey's model in his naval career has always been Lord Nelson.

== Series chronology ==
This novel references actual events with accurate historical detail, like all in this series. In respect to the internal chronology of the series, it is the second of eleven novels (beginning with The Surgeon's Mate) that might take five or six years to happen but are all pegged to an extended 1812, or as Patrick O'Brian says it, 1812a and 1812b (introduction to The Far Side of the World, the tenth novel in this series). The events of The Yellow Admiral again match up with the historical years of the Napoleonic wars in sequence, as the first six novels did.

== Reviews ==
One reviewer finds good writing throughout the novel, whether depicting the tedious work of the naval blockade or the quick thinking needed to deal with Turkish politics, while the other reviewer felt that the novel was not interesting until the Surprise reached the Ionian coast.

Kirkus Reviews found this novel to have splendid adventures and the writing at a stately pace, reviewing it at the reissue in late 1991. Aubrey loses favour inside the Admiralty: "He can't get things right on shore, but he is quick enough to put Worcester to trim, taking slack out of the sails and the crew until Worcester is the ablest ship in the line bottling up Napoleon's navy in Toulon." Maturin is now married, but he joins Aubrey for this mission, doing some intelligence work. The old ship "gives up the ghost after one too many skirmishes" and Aubrey shifts to HMS Surprise to "tinker with the balance of power at the fringes of the Turkish empire. Splendid adventures at a stately pace."

Publishers Weekly said that Aubrey is caught in a net of Turkish politics and rivalries. First, "there is little excitement as HMS Worcester settles in with the other blockading ships, some with crews showing signs of strain from remaining constantly alert but inactive." "Harte dispatches Aubrey on a delicate mission to the politically volatile Ionian coast." There he navigates the complex politics, though "Aubrey knows that should he fail, the admiral would like nothing better than to throw him to the dogs."

== Publication history ==
- 1981 William Collins hardback first edition ISBN 0-00-222365-1
- 1982 Fontana paperback edition
- 1992, January W. W. Norton USA paperback ISBN 978-0-393-30821-1
- 1993 HarperCollins paperback edition
- 1996 HarperCollins B-format paperback edition
- 2003 HarperCollins paperback edition ISBN 0 00 649922 8
- Recorded Books, LLC Audio edition narrated by Patrick Tull ISBN 1402591810
- 2011 W. W. Norton & Company e-book edition USA

The books in this series by Patrick O'Brian were re-issued in the US by W. W. Norton & Co. in 1992, after a re-discovery of the author and this series by Norton, finding a new audience for the entire series. Norton issued The Ionian Mission eleven years after its initial publication, as a paperback in 1992. Ironically, it was a US publisher, J. B. Lippincott & Co., who asked O'Brian to write the first book in the series, Master and Commander published in 1969. Collins picked it up in the UK, and continued to publish each novel as O'Brian completed another story. Beginning with The Nutmeg of Consolation in 1991, the novels were released at about the same time in the USA (by W W Norton) and the UK (by HarperCollins, the name of Collins after a merger).

Novels prior to 1992 were published rapidly in the US for that new market. Following novels were released at the same time by the UK and US publishers. Collins asked Geoff Hunt in 1988 to do the cover art for the twelve books published by then, with The Letter of Marque being the first book to have Hunt's work on the first edition. He continued to paint the covers for future books; the covers were used on both USA and UK editions. Reissues of earlier novels used the Geoff Hunt covers.
