= Fothering =

Covering of a leak in a ship

Fothering refers in nautical contexts to covering a leak in a ship with a sail containing rope fibres to prevent it from sinking after being damaged. This was the technique used to help to refloat HMS Endeavour after she went aground on the Great Barrier Reef on 11 June 1770.

Later, and more efficiently, a sail closely thrummed with yarns was used.
