= HMS Surprise (novel) =

1973 novel by Patrick O'Brian

- First edition
- Author: Patrick O'Brian
- Language: English
- Series: Aubrey–Maturin series
- Genre: Historical novel
- Publisher: Collins (UK)
- Publication date: 1973
- Publication place: United Kingdom
- Media type: Print Hardback & Paperback & Audio Book Compact audio cassette, Compact Disc
- Pages: 416
- ISBN: 0-397-00998-4 First hardback edition
- OCLC: 722008
- Dewey Decimal: 823/.9/14
- LC Class: PZ3.O1285 Hac PR6029.B55
- Preceded by: Post Captain
- Followed by: The Mauritius Command

HMS Surprise is the third historical novel in the Aubrey–Maturin series by Patrick O'Brian, first published in 1973. The series follows the partnership of Royal Navy Captain Jack Aubrey and his ship's surgeon Stephen Maturin during the wars against Napoleonic France.

In the story, Maturin's work as an intelligence agent gets him into trouble just as Aubrey takes command of a new ship, HMS Surprise. Later, the friends embark on a long voyage to bring an ambassador to Southeast Asia, rounding the southern tip of Africa.

The novel is often considered one of the best in the series. Some reviewers found it had "superb depictions of life", yet too full of nautical detail, while others found that detail part of the author's erudition and not in the way of the plot. The author showed "capacity for creating another completely believable world", while another reviewer said the novel is "stretching its genre [naval adventure] but never escaping it."

== Plot summary ==
Shortly after the events of Post Captain, the Admiralty debates the prize money to be awarded to Aubrey and the other captains of the convoy involved in the recent action off the coast of Portugal, in which several Spanish treasure ships were intercepted carrying the price of Spain's entry into the war on the side of France. On the quibble that Spain had not yet formally entered the war, the new First Lord of the Admiralty decides the vast sum is a "Droit of the Admiralty" and thus is not to be shared out with the captors. Jack is disheartened to hear that his reward will be much less than he and Sophia had expected. The First Lord also makes a blunder by mentioning the name of intelligence agent Stephen Maturin during the proceedings, putting Maturin at risk.

Unconcerned, Stephen goes on a mission to Minorca and arranges for Jack, still acting commander of HMS Lively and now on blockade duty near Toulon, to pick him up at Port Mahon. Lively pursues and burns a French supply ship, from which Jack gains valuable loot: a gunboat and a French signal book. When Stephen fails to show up at the rendezvous point, Jack learns from a Catalan revolutionary that his friend has been captured by French intelligence and is being held in Port Mahon in the former home of Admiral Harte, which Jack knows well. Jack and a rescue party use the captured gunboat and the French signals to slip into port unmolested. They storm the house and rescue Stephen, who has been brutally tortured, and kill most of the French interrogators.

Back in England, Stephen tries to recover his strength and the use of his flayed hands. Jack is taken by bailiffs and held in a sponging-house until he can pay off his debts. His marriage to Sophia Williams is deferred, as her mother insists that he be debt-free. Sir Joseph Blaine visits Stephen, who tells Blaine of his capture and Aubrey's predicament, requesting that Jack be advanced his pending reward and released. Blaine promises to help, and also gives Aubrey command of a new ship, HMS Surprise. Before he embarks, Jack meets Sophia in a coach in the middle of the night, and they promise to marry no one else.

Aubrey and Maturin depart in the Surprise with orders to ferry an ambassador, Mr Stanhope, to the Sultan of Kampong on the Malay Peninsula. Stanhope almost immediately takes to his cabin with seasickness. Surprise is caught in the doldrums north of the equator, and the crew begins to show signs of scurvy. Stephen insists that they touch on the coast of Brazil to obtain fresh fruits. On a very hot Sunday, the doctor requests a boat for a quick visit to St. Paul's Rock, and Second Lieutenant Nicolls agrees to row him out. The rocky islet and the nearby Surprise are suddenly struck by intense squalls; Nicolls drowns and Stephen survives for two days on bird-fouled water and the blood of the resident boobies. A badly damaged Surprise recovers Stephen, who remarks that the days under the hot sun have restored his health after the torture. The ship then stops in Brazil for repairs. This is Stephen's first time in the New World, so he explores the jungle and returns with a sloth, which Jack introduces to alcohol. They also put in at Rio for mail, where Jack learns that Admiral Linois, who once took him prisoner, is patrolling the Indian Ocean at the head of a French squadron.

Refitted and repainted, Surprise maintains a cautious distance while rounding the Cape of Good Hope, held by the Dutch who are allied with Napoleon. Nearing the waters of the Antarctic Ocean, Surprise endures a severe storm, and Stanhope becomes very ill. They put into Bombay in British India to refit after the storms and rest the ambassador. Stephen meets a local street girl named Dil, who eagerly shows him around the city. He is watching a parade with Dil when he sees Diana Villiers, who has returned to Bombay ahead of her companion, the wealthy merchant Richard Canning. Stephen and Diana agree to visit, and spend several days together, at the end of which Stephen asks her to marry him. Diana does not give an answer but promises she will when Surprise stops in Calcutta. Stephen later finds Dil dead and her body looted of the valuables he had given her; he supervises her cremation on the shore.

Soon after the voyage resumes Stanhope becomes ill again. His condition grows more serious with each passing day, and before reaching the Sunda Strait they are compelled to find solid ground to help him recover. Pullings recommends a tiny beach surrounded by jungle, and they hastily bring the ambassador to it, where he dies a few hours later. Their mission now void, Surprise sets sail for home.

They encounter the East India Company's China Fleet, returning to England unescorted. A day after departing the fleet, Surprise spots Linois's squadron in the Indian Ocean. Surprise engages its smallest ship, the corvette Berceau, shredding her rigging; Jack bluffs by signaling to imaginary reinforcements beyond the horizon. Surprise pretends to be badly damaged while speeding back to the China Fleet to warn them and organise a defence. Though some of the merchant captains want to flee before Linois arrives, Jack convinces them that the only way out of the situation is to fight. The largest ships of the China Fleet are disguised as men-of-war and Jack distributes some of his officers to help them during the battle. As the French squadron closes on the Indiamen, Surprise engages Linois's warship, the Marengo; she is outgunned and in peril when one of the Indiamen suddenly engages the French ship from the other side, forcing Marengo to disengage. Damage forces Linois to abandon the chase in order to refit.

Ashore in Calcutta, Aubrey receives an enthusiastic welcome from the merchants, including Canning, who are happy to pay for Surprise's repairs. As a personal reward, Canning offers Jack the opportunity to transport a chest of jewels as freight, which will earn him a portion of the cargo's value upon his arrival in England. Knowing the money will be enough to clear the last of his debts so he can marry Sophia, he immediately writes to her, asking her to meet him in Madeira.

During the refit, Stephen asks Diana for her answer to his marriage proposal, but Canning suddenly appears. In a fit of jealousy he slaps Stephen, who responds by challenging him to a duel. Canning's shot hits Stephen in the ribs, but Stephen's hits Canning in the heart, killing him. Stephen convinces Diana to return to England on a merchant ship that will leave immediately rather than tend to him as he recovers aboard the Surprise. With the help of Aubrey, M'Alister, and a mirror, Stephen stoically operates on himself, removing the bullet lodged beneath his rib. Jack tends to his friend during the worst of his fever. In his delirium the usually private Stephen voices many of his thoughts and secrets.

Arriving at Madeira, Jack is dismayed to learn that Sophia is not there; Stephen finds a note from Diana returning the ring he gave her and explaining that she has travelled to America with a wealthy man named Johnstone, whom she has agreed to marry. Stephen is devastated. Within a day's sailing, Jack overtakes the frigate HMS Ethalion under his loyal friend Heneage Dundas and finds that Sophia is aboard. Jack wants to get married immediately, but Sophia insists they do it properly, when they return to England.

== Characters ==
- Jack Aubrey: Captain in the Royal Navy on HMS Lively, and then appointed Captain of HMS Surprise.
- Stephen Maturin: Ship's surgeon, physician, natural philosopher, intelligence agent and close friend to Aubrey.
- Sophia Williams: Young beautiful woman promised to Jack Aubrey, of good family and good marriage settlement.
- Mrs Williams: Sophia's mother, a woman of unpleasant ways who wants her daughters well married.
- Cecelia and Frances Williams: Younger sisters of Sophia, each married before the Surprise reaches Bombay. Frances marries Sir Oliver Floode, MP, and Cecelia marries his younger cousin, a militia officer.
- Diana Villiers: Cousin to Sophia who escapes the Williams household to be kept by Canning, and who is the love of Stephen Maturin.
- Mr Hincksey: Reverend who lives near Mapes Court, visiting often. Mrs Williams pushes Sophia to marry him instead of her fiancé Aubrey. Instead, he officiates at the weddings of Cecelia and Frances. He is a friend to Rev Mr White.
- Sir Joseph Blaine: Head of naval intelligence, entomologist, and Maturin's contact.
- Mr Waring: Assistant to Sir Joseph and his likely successor upon Blaine's retirement.
- Mr Simmons: First lieutenant on HMS Lively, who is effective in the actions taking out French shore batteries, the destruction of French stores ship Dromadaire and taking the French gunboat, with its current signal book. The gunboat is used to retrieve Maturin from torture in Port Mahon. He told Aubrey of the engagement announced in The Times and of the gift the Livelys will give him and Sophia.
- Mr Randall: Second lieutenant on HMS Lively.
- Lord Garron: Third lieutenant on HMS Lively. He is met again in The Mauritius Command as captain of a brig in the action, at which point he has inherited the title "Lord Narborough", which suggests that "Lord Garron" was his courtesy title as the eldest son of a peer.
- Mr Fielding: Lieutenant on HMS Lively.
- Mr John Dashwood: Lieutenant on HMS Lively.
- Joan Maragall: Catalan friend of Maturin who leads Aubrey to him on Port Mahon.
- Captain Dutourd: The lead French interrogator and torturer at Port Mahon, and the one who escaped death when Aubrey rescued the prisoners. Possibly killed by the other prisoners after he left the building.
- Mr Hervey: First lieutenant on HMS Surprise until Bombay, where he joins his uncle, an admiral, for likely promotion. He does his work, but does not have the authority needed for best operation of the ship.
- Mr Stourton: First lieutenant replacing Hervey, more qualified for his role, especially during the action with Linois.
- Mr Nicolls: Second lieutenant aboard Surprise. He rows Maturin out to St Paul's Rocks. When the fierce storm hits, Maturin survives, but there is no trace of Nicolls or the boat. Before the storm, he tells Maturin of his troubles with his wife, who has not written to him to end the argument they had.
- Tom Pullings: Lieutenant in the Royal Navy, third of the Surprise, and considered a follower of Captain Aubrey. He is married now. His experience during the peace aboard East Indiamen serves HMS Surprise well as she nears Sunda Strait and Sumatra.
- Mr Babbington: Midshipman who is nearing his time to pass for lieutenant as Surprise slowly makes her way south in the Atlantic Ocean. He is appointed acting lieutenant when the second lieutenant is lost in the storm. He is always seeking female companions in port, sometimes leaving the ship without permission.
- Mr Callow: One of the young men in the midshipmen's berth. In the action against Linois, a block falls on his head, which he survives.
- Barret Bonden: Aubrey's coxswain, who learns to write by lessons from Maturin on the Surprise sailing in the Atlantic.
- Preserved Killick: Aubrey's steward.
- Mr M'Alister: Assistant surgeon to Stephen Maturin in sick room, and in Maturin's surgery on himself.
- Mr Stanhope: Sent as ambassador to the Sultan of Kampong, the reason for Aubrey's mission on the Surprise.
- Mr Atkins: Secretary to Mr Stanhope, then in the employ of Canning upon reaching Calcutta, an agent for Maturin.
- Reverend Mr White: Parson in Stanhope's party. He alone stays on HMS Surprise after Stanhope dies, and they encounter the East Indiamen offering faster return to England for the cost of passage.
- Dil: Girl about 10 years old, Maturin's exuberant Indian guide in Bombay who is killed for the silver bangles Maturin gave her.
- Richard Canning: Rich Jewish merchant, Diana Villier's protector in India. He is married to another woman who plans to meet him in Calcutta. Canning encounters Maturin in Bombay and again in Calcutta.
- Charles-Alexandre Léon Durand Linois: French Admiral aboard Marengo, in charge of the French squadron.
- General Aubrey: Father of Jack Aubrey. He brings his wife and son to visit Sophia, unannounced, fortunately when her mother was not home.
- Mrs Aubrey: Second wife of General Aubrey, previously a dairy maid at the family estate of Woolcombe.
- Philip Aubrey: Son born to General Aubrey by his second wife, as mentioned in previous novel Post Captain.
- Mr Johnstone of America: Man who Villiers joined in Madeira (called "Mr. Johnson" in later books).
- Heneage Dundas: Captain in the Royal Navy and close friend to Aubrey, carries Sophia to meet him near Madeira.

== Ships ==
The British:

- HMS Lively
- HMS Surprise – frigate

China fleet

- Addington – Indiaman
- Ocean – Indiaman
- Camden – Indiaman
- Bombay Castle – Indiaman
- Alfred – Indiaman
- Wexwood – Indiaman
- Lushington – Indiaman
- Royal George – Indiaman

The French:

- Marengo – 74-gun ship of the line commanded by Linois
- Berceau – 22-gun corvette
- Semillante – 36-gun frigate
- Belle Poule – 40-gun frigate

== Allusions to historical events ==
The capture of the Spanish treasure fleet, with Jack in command of HMS Lively, is based on the historical Action of 5 October 1804 (also known as the Battle of Cape Santa Maria), and is recounted at the end of the preceding novel Post Captain. In the fictionalized version, Aubrey replaces Captain Graham Hamond as acting commander of HMS Lively when Hamond is required to attend Parliament; in reality, Hamond was present during the battle. This battle also features in the 1962 novel Hornblower and the Hotspur, the last-published full-length novel in C. S. Forester's Horatio Hornblower series. Forester adds Hornblower in the Hotspur alongside the five British ships sent to intercept the fleet.

At the opening of HMS Surprise, the Admiralty discusses what to do with the Spanish gold seized during the battle, for which the victorious British captains and their crews, including Jack Aubrey and Stephen Maturin, expect a substantial share of the prize money, as was usual. However, the huge amount of bullion seized leads the Admiralty to declare it a droit belonging to the Admiralty itself, on the technicality that Spain had not yet legally declared war on England and therefore the treasure cannot be considered a war prize. The same result was also decided in real life, with the British captains receiving far smaller rewards than they might otherwise have won.

After he is advanced his reward and freed from the debtors' prison, Aubrey is given command of HMS Surprise, a fictional version of the historical HMS Surprise, with a different backstory. She becomes the most important fictional ship in the Aubrey–Maturin series.

The "cutting out" (capturing while in port, either at anchor or berthed) of HMS Hermione refers to an actual event involving HMS Surprise that occurred in 1799.

Aubrey's defense of the China Fleet against a French squadron under Contre-Admiral Charles-Alexandre Léon Durand, Comte de Linois, in the Indian Ocean is a fictionalization of the real-life Battle of Pulo Aura in February 1804. In reality, the merchant ships of the East India Company defended themselves, without any King's ships escorting them. Commodore Nathaniel Dance gave the orders attributed to Aubrey, disguising several of the larger East Indiamen as Royal Navy men-of-war and forming the line of battle which successfully intimidated Linois into abandoning the pursuit after only a brief exchange of fire. Dance was celebrated for his aggressive tactics during the battle and later knighted for his heroism, while Linois was criticized for failing to capture the extremely valuable fleet.

== Reviews ==
Valerie Webster writing in The Scotsman found that "His books can absorb and enthral landlubbers like myself who do not even know the difference between a jib-boom and a taffrail."

Library Journal reviewed this novel as part of an abridged audio edition, finding "superb depictions of life" and highly recommended it, mentioning "O'Brian's exquisitely accurate historical detail". Mark Pumphrery, writing for Library Journal, remarks the friendship of the Aubrey and Maturin, which "plays out against an expanse of ocean, from India to the Atlantic, with a full complement of battles and adventures at sea for devotees of naval fiction."

Publishers Weekly liked the plot but, unlike the other reviewers, found the nautical detail sometimes overwhelming. They enjoy seeing the environment through Maturin's eyes, and appreciate what drives Aubrey to engage with French admiral Linois, as Aubrey wants enough prize money to marry his true love. In sum, "Stretching its genre but never escaping it, the novel will impress those who enjoy swashbucklers."

Helen Lucy Burk writing in the Irish Press said "Few, very few, books have made my heart thud with excitement. H.M.S. Surprise managed it. I read it cruising through the tame Adriatic, and several times found myself forced to pace about the deck to calm my pulse....Patrick O'Brian's erudition is phenomenal, as is his capacity for creating another completely believable world. He convinces with his total accuracy even in tiny details."

== Adaptations ==
The novel was adapted in three parts in the Afternoon Play strand on BBC Radio 4, adapted by Roger Danes and directed and produced by Bruce Young, with Aubrey played by David Robb and Maturin by Richard Dillane. The rest of the cast was:

- Preserved Killick – Jon Glover
- Barret Bonden – David Timson
- Sir Joseph Blaine – Struan Rodger
- Sophie Williams – Liz Sutherland
- Lieutenant Pullings – David Holt
- Lieutenant Simmons – Dan Starkey
- Mrs Williams / Lady Forbes – Lesley Nicol
- Cecilia Williams / Miss Agatha – Sarah Danes
- Diana Villiers – Adjoa Andoh
- Arthur Stanhope – David Timson
- Midshipman Callow – Carl Prekopp
- Tobias Atkins – Stephen Critchlow
- Lieutenant Nichols – Dan Starkey
- Midshipman Babbington – Chris Pavlo
- Canning – Chris Pavlo

Several of the novel's plot elements, including Maturin performing surgery on himself to remove the bullet, were adapted into the 2003 film Master and Commander: The Far Side of the World.

== Publication history ==
- 1973, USA, J. B. Lippincott, hardback ISBN 0-397-00998-4 / 978-0-397-00998-5 (USA edition)
- 1973, UK, Collins hardback First UK edition ISBN 0-00-221316-8
- 1976, Fontana; Paperback edition ISBN 0006141811
- 1989 Fontana Press paperback ISBN 0-00-614181-1 / 978-0-00-614181-5 (UK edition)
- 1991, May W. W. Norton paperback ISBN 0-393-30761-1 / 978-0-393-30761-0 (USA edition)
- 1992 Recorded Books audio CD, narrator Patrick Tull ISBN 1-4025-2828-0 / 978-1-4025-2828-6 (USA edition)
- 1993, February ISIS Audio Books audio cassette ISBN 1-85089-876-6 / 978-1-85089-876-4 (UK edition)
- 1994, November W. W. Norton & Company; Hardcover Reprint edition ISBN 0-393-03703-7 / 978-0-393-03703-6 (USA edition)
- 1995, November Bespoke Audio audio cassette ISBN 1-86051-005-1 / 978-1-86051-005-2 (UK edition)
- 1997, January HarperCollins paperback ISBN 0-00-649917-1 / 978-0-00-649917-6 (UK edition)
- 1997, April Firebird Distributing audio cassette, narrator Robert Hardy ISBN 0-00-105331-0 / 978-0-00-105331-1 (UK edition)
- 1998, January HarperCollins hardback ISBN 0-00-221316-8 / 978-0-397-00998-5 (UK edition)
- 1998, August Random House Audio audio cassette ISBN 0-375-40524-0 / 978-0-375-40524-2 (USA edition)
- 2000, June Thorndike Press; Largeprint hardcover edition ISBN 0-7862-1934-3 / 978-0-7862-1934-6 (USA edition)
- 2000, June Chivers Large Print paperback ISBN 0-7540-2350-8 / 978-0-7540-2350-0 (UK edition)
- 2001, September Recorded Books audio cassette ISBN 1-4025-0222-2 / 978-1-4025-0222-4 (USA edition)
- 2002, HarperCollins; reprint paperback edition ISBN 0006499171
- 2002, January Chivers Large Print hardback ISBN 0-7540-1460-6 / 978-0-7540-1460-7 (UK edition)
- 2002, September Soundings Audio audio CD ISBN 1-84283-262-X / 978-1-84283-262-2 (UK edition)
- 2004, March Blackstone Audiobooks Audio CD edition ISBN 0-7861-2765-1 / 978-1-4159-0399-5 (USA edition)
- 2004, April Blackstone Audio MP3 CD audio ISBN 0-7861-8562-7 / 978-0-7861-8562-7 (USA edition)
- 2004, April Blackstone Audio audio CD Library edition ISBN 0-7861-8633-X / 978-0-7861-8633-4 (USA edition)
- 2004, July Books on Tape audio CD ISBN 1-4159-0400-6 / 978-1-4159-0400-8 (USA edition)
- 2007 Harper paperback ISBN 0-00-725585-3 / 978-0-00-725585-6 (UK edition)
- 2011, W. W. Norton & Company; e-book edition ISBN 9780393088465
- 2013, August Blackstone Audio audio CD, reader Simon Vance ISBN 1-4829-5512-1 / 978-1-4829-5512-5 (USA edition)

This novel was first published by Lippincott in the US and Collins in the UK, both in 1973. W W Norton issued a reprint in the USA 21 years after the initial publication as part of its reissue in paperback of all the novels in the series prior to 1991. Except for the 1973 Collins hardback and 1976 Fontana paperback UK editions above, the list of editions is drawn from Fantastic Fiction.

The process of reissuing the novels initially published prior to 1991 was in full swing in 1991, as the whole series gained a new and wider audience, as Mark Howowitz describes in writing about The Nutmeg of Consolation, the fourteenth novel in the series and initially published in 1991.

Two of my favourite friends are fictitious characters; they live in more than a dozen volumes always near at hand. Their names are Jack Aubrey and Stephen Maturin, and their creator is a 77-year-old novelist named Patrick O'Brian, whose 14 books about them have been continuously in print in England since the first, "Master and Commander," was published in 1970. O'Brian's British fans include T. J. Binyon, Iris Murdoch, A. S. Byatt, Timothy Mo and the late Mary Renault, but, until recently, this splendid saga of two serving officers in the British Royal Navy during the Napoleonic Wars was unavailable in this country, apart from the first few instalments which went immediately out of print. Last year, however, W. W. Norton decided to reissue the series in its entirety, and so far nine of the 14 have appeared here, including the most recent chapter, The Nutmeg of Consolation.

== Bibliography ==
- A.E. Cunningham, ed. (1994). Patrick O'Brian: Critical appreciations and a bibliography. British Library. ISBN 0-7123-1071-1.
- Anne Chotzinoff Grossman, Lisa Grossman Thomas (2000). Lobscouse and Spotted Dog: Which Is a Gastronomic Companion to the Aubrey/Maturin Novels. W. W. Norton & Co. ISBN 0-393-32094-4.
- Dean King (2001). A Sea of Words: Lexicon and Companion for Patrick O'Brian's Seafaring Tales. Henry Holt. ISBN 0-8050-6615-2.
- Dean King (2001). Harbors and High Seas: Map Book and Geographical Guide to the Aubrey/Maturin Novels of Patrick O'Brian. Henry Holt. ISBN 0-8050-6614-4.
- Brian Lavery (2003). Jack Aubrey Commands: An Historical Companion to the Naval World of Patrick O'Brian. Conway Maritime. ISBN 0-85177-946-8.
- David Miller (2003). The World of Jack Aubrey: Twelve-Pounders, Frigates, Cutlasses, and Insignia of His Majesty's Royal Navy. Running Press Book Publishers. ISBN 0-7624-1652-1.
- Richard O'Neill (2003). Patrick O'Brian's Navy: The Illustrated Companion to Jack Aubrey's World. Running Press. ISBN 0-7624-1540-1.
