= James Grant (navigator) =

Royal Navy officer and explorer (1772–1833)

- Born: 1772; Forres, Scotland
- Died: 11 November 1833 (aged 60–61); St Servan, France
- Military career
- Allegiance: UK
- Branch: Royal Navy
- Rank: Midshipman (1794); Lieutenant (1800); Commander (1805)
- Commands: Lady Nelson; Hired armed cutter Hawke; Raven; Thracian

James Grant (1772 – 11 November 1833) was a Scottish born British Royal Navy officer and navigator in the early nineteenth century. He served in Australia in 1800–1801 and was the first to map the Bass Strait between mainland Australia and Tasmania.

== Early life ==
Grant was baptized on 6 September 1772 at Forres, Morayshire, Scotland. He was educated at King's College, Aberdeen, under Dr. William Chalmers. He entered the Royal Navy as a captain's servant in August 1793 and was appointed a midshipman in May 1794. He passed his board for promotion to lieutenant and was promoted in 1800.

== Voyages of exploration ==
Thanks to his friendship with Captain John Schank, as a lieutenant he took command of Lady Nelson, towards the end of 1799 he sailed from the River Thames for Port Jackson on 18 March 1800. A brig of 60 tons, she carried a crew comprising the commanding officer, two mates and twelve seamen. He sailed into Table Cape, South Africa on 8 July 1800. Here Grant received dispatches from the Duke of Portland advising him of the discovery of a strait between New South Wales and Van Diemen's Land. He was to sail through it on his way to Port Jackson, instead of sailing around Van Diemen's Land. Thus his was the first ship to sail through Bass Strait from west to east, charting the then unknown coastline. Lady Nelson entered the heads at Port Jackson at six in the evening of 16 December 1800 after a passage of seventy-one days from Cape Town.

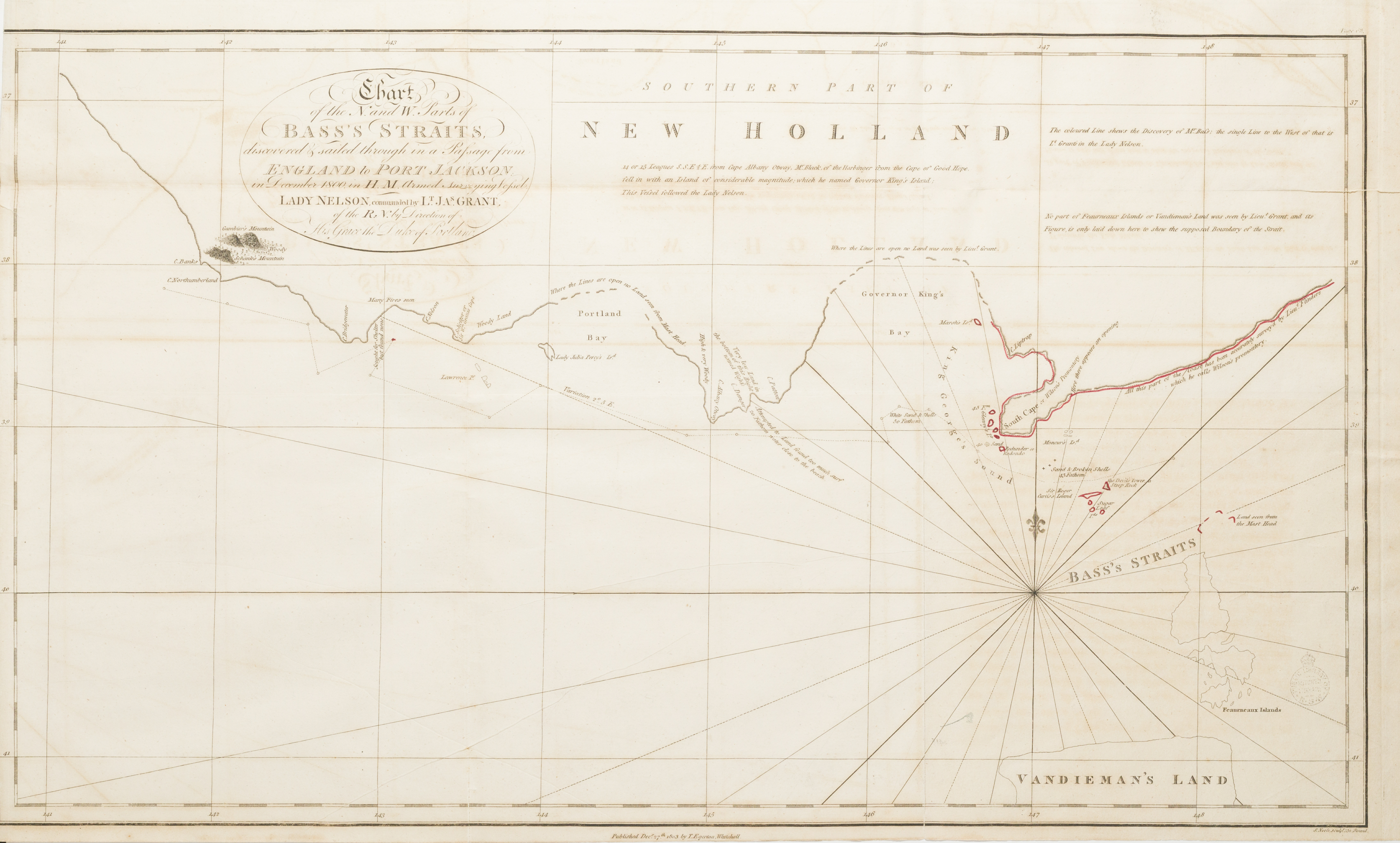
Grant's nautical chart of the Bass Strait

After a particularly unpleasant period of disagreement with the officers of the New South Wales Corps in Sydney, Grant asked permission on 31 August 1801 to return to Europe, which was granted. King spoke very favourably of Grant's abilities as an officer and seaman.

== Later work ==
He was awarded the rank of commander in January 1805. Despite his wounds, he later commanded the sloops HMS Raven and HMS Thracian.

== Death ==
He died at Saint-Servan, France, on 11 November 1833.

== Legacy ==
He was the first European to land on Phillip Island and Churchill Island. The south-west point of Phillip Island is named after him. He established a garden on Churchill Island.

== Grant in fiction ==
Grant's early career is the base for a character also named James Grant in Patrick O'Brian's novel Desolation Island, part of the Aubrey–Maturin series. In real life and in the fiction, Grant accomplished much at a young age sailing a sloop to New South Wales (a lieutenant could be captain of a sloop in the Royal Navy of that era) and writing a book about the voyage. In real life he was promoted to commander; in fiction he is still a lieutenant in 1811, but wanting to be the captain.

== See also ==
- Mount Gambier (volcano)
- Mount Schank
