= Diana Villiers =

Fictional character by Patrick O'Brian

- First appearance: Post Captain
- Created by: Patrick O'Brian

In-universe information
- Gender: Female
- Spouse: Stephen Maturin
- Children: Brigid Maturin

Diana Villiers is a fictional character in the Aubrey-Maturin series of novels by Patrick O'Brian. Described as beautiful, mercurial, and entirely unreliable, she is the great love and great sorrow of Stephen Maturin's life.

== Character history ==
Diana enters the series in the second novel of the series, Post Captain, which begins with Captain Jack Aubrey and Doctor Stephen Maturin living ashore during the Peace of Amiens. They first see her in a fox hunting field near their leased country house, and are impressed by her beauty and bold spirit.

In Post Captain, Diana is living with the Williams family, as a poor relation. Previously a resident of India, where her father was a general and her husband was an official of the East India Company, she returned to England after both men were killed in the same battle with the forces of Tippoo Sahib. Both Aubrey and Maturin are intrigued by the fiery Villiers, although Aubrey also forms a conflicted attachment to her more placid cousin Sophia Williams. Despite Maturin's social disadvantages of being unattractive, illegitimate, and Catholic, Villiers enjoys his company and even admits him to her bedroom. However, she does not seem to reciprocate his infatuation and carries on simultaneous affairs with other men, including Aubrey.

In HMS Surprise, Maturin meets Diana in India, where she is living under the protection (i.e. as the mistress) of a wealthy civilian, a married man named Canning. There she explains the difficulties she faces, being financially dependent on Canning and at the same time rejected and covertly insulted by most of her equals in that small, bigoted community. Maturin proposes marriage and she asks for time to consider; when he returns to repeat his offer, Canning surprises the pair and challenges him. Villiers' two lovers duel: originally, Maturin only intends to superficially wound Canning, but when Canning fires first with the clear intention of killing him and wounds him so that he can no longer fire using his normal hand. Maturin then has to then use his other hand and a combination of that and aiming whilst suffering a serious wound causes him shoot Canning mortally. Maturin appears to have still only intended to incapacitate Canning and is sad to have killed him. Villiers accepts the victor Maturin, visits him often and suggests that she take care of him in the journey back to Europe as his nurse. However, this last offer is not accepted by Jack Aubrey and they make the journey in different ships. Before the ship in which the recovered Maturin travels can catch hers and the marriage can take place, she goes to the United States with Johnson, an American she met in Calcutta. She returns to London in Desolation Island, having left Johnson, who turned out to have been married to another woman. Maturin sees her there and all his hopes rise again. She and her lady's companion, Mrs. Wogan, are questioned as spies by an incompetent admiral, sending Villiers away as innocent, while her friend negotiates a sentence of transportation to Botany Bay, on the ship that Jack Aubrey captains. Maturin joins him, by way of relief from the intelligence and social pressures on him. Villiers' returns to the United States and rejoins Johnson.

When Maturin and Aubrey arrive in Boston as prisoners of war, they meet Villiers again as Johnson prepares to reject her for a new mistress. Maturin repeats his offer of marriage, and she accepts. They leave the United States with a diamond necklace that Johnson had given her – a necklace of immense value with a centre stone called "The Blue Peter." Once safely away, Diana is reluctant to go through with the ceremony because she knows she is pregnant by Johnson. She asks Maturin to give her an abortion, but he refuses. He takes her to Paris, where she can complete her confinement and give birth without the ignominy of being snubbed by British society. There she miscarries.

When Maturin is imprisoned in Paris, Diana uses the Blue Peter, believing it to be a ransom to secure his release. In actuality, Aubrey and Maturin's release had already been secured by parties working against Napoleon and who wished to establish communications with British intelligence via Maturin. On the ship back to England, they are finally married by Babbington, with the bride given away by Aubrey, now her cousin by marriage.

Maturin buys Diana a fashionable townhouse in London, but they continue to live separately. Maturin stays at the Grapes, in the Liberties of the Savoy, as his personal habits, including bringing dissected corpses and animals into the house, and carelessness with personal hygiene, make him disagreeable to Diana's fashionable lifestyle.

While Diana enjoys London society, Maturin and Aubrey are posted to the Mediterranean in The Ionian Mission. In Treason's Harbour, rumours of Maturin having an affair in Malta are spread by enemies of Maturin. Hearing these, Diana runs to Sweden under the protection of Jagiello, a Lithuanian count in The Far Side of the World. She later claims her relationship with Jagiello is neither romantic nor sexual. Maturin eventually travels to Sweden in The Letter of Marque where they are reconciled again after Maturin suffers a severe accident under the influence of laudanum.

While Maturin is on another voyage to the Far East, Diana gives birth to a daughter, Brigid, who appears to suffer from a form of autism. In despair, Diana leaves Brigid with Mrs Oakes and disappears. However, in The Commodore, Maturin tracks her down again in Ireland, while young Brigid is with Padeen Coleman and Mrs Oakes in safety in Avila, Spain. Brigid began to talk and interact when Padeen entered her life. Diana and Stephen are reconciled. In The Yellow Admiral, the two travel in Spain with Brigid, Padeen and Mrs Oakes, so Stephen can share the places special to him with his wife and his daughter. Though the war on the ground is still happening in Spain, they travel safely in a coach, returning to England from Valencia in a packet ship. On return to England, Maturin cannot access his wealth due to conflicts with the Spanish government, so they live in a wing of Woolcombe, the Aubrey family seat that Jack inherited on his father's death, and where his family is now living. Diana is a resourceful woman, pawning her Blue Peter diamond for 50,000 pounds, so they are not pinched, and she can ride and breed horses, at which she is highly skilled. She pays a rent to her cousin for living in the unused wing, making the Aubrey family life easier, as they too are temporarily short on cash, renting out their marital home of Ashgrove Cottage. When her cousin Sophia relates her marital issues, Diana and Mrs. Oakes give her a new perspective on marriage, how she might get more enjoyment from sex, which conversation is learned by her retelling it to her husband. Diana is quick on the mark in the story, as she intercepts orders for Aubrey to return to his ship on the Brest blockade, so Aubrey can attend a vital committee meeting in Parliament on the issue of the enclosure of some of his land now used in common, for which Aubrey is most grateful.

Diana and Brigid spend a lot of time with Aubrey's family. Diana enjoys driving a carriage and team of horses, exhibiting high skill in carrying her husband and Jack Aubrey across a narrow bridge, while bringing them to the coast to return to their ship. Diana makes her final appearance in The Hundred Days, in which she and her aunt, Sophie's mother, are killed when the carriage runs off a bridge at a dangerous corner.

== Reception ==
At a seminar hosted by the Smithsonian Institution in 2000; Washington Post contributor Ken Ringle described Diana as a "bitch-goddess" and "one of the very greatest female characters in all fiction."

In a series retrospective interview, author Rachel McMillan praises O'Brian's depiction of Diana, noting the character's strong independence. McMillan also praises the unique characteristics in Stephen and Diana's relationship and speculates much of Diana's character may have been inspired by O'Brian's second wife Mary Tolstoy.
