= Desolation Island (novel) =

1978 novel by Patrick O'Brian

- Cover of the first edition
- Author: Patrick O'Brian
- Language: English
- Series: Aubrey–Maturin series
- Genre: Historical novel
- Publisher: Collins (UK); Stein & Day (US)
- Publication date: 1978
- Publication place: United Kingdom
- Media type: Print (Hardback & Paperback)
- Pages: 276
- ISBN: 0-00-222145-4 First edition hardback
- OCLC: 44024595
- Preceded by: The Mauritius Command
- Followed by: The Fortune of War

Desolation Island is the fifth historical novel in the Aubrey–Maturin series by Patrick O'Brian. It was first published in 1978.

The story follows Jack Aubrey as he takes command of HMS Leopard on a mission meant to reach Australia, and occurs prior to the War of 1812. Stephen Maturin joins the voyage in order to monitor a beautiful young American spy who is aboard the ship as a prisoner.

Critics praised the novel's "literate, clear-eyed realism" at initial publication, as well as the stirring naval action in the cold southern ocean as the Leopard is chased by the Dutch ship.

== Plot summary ==
Having recovered financially in The Mauritius Command, Captain Jack Aubrey is expanding his home and has paid off his mother-in-law's debts, and his wife is no longer pinching pennies. His household is staffed with seamen, and his twin daughters and infant son are thriving. Despite his comfortable pay while serving in the Fencibles, he is still frittering away his fortune with foolish business endeavours. Stephen Maturin learns that Diana Villiers has returned from America, unmarried, but when he calls upon her he finds only a letter explaining that her young American friend Louisa Wogan has been apprehended by British authorities and questioned as a spy. Though Diana herself is innocent, she has been forced to flee England suddenly, so Stephen pays her bills. Arrangements are made to transport Mrs Wogan to a penal colony in New South Wales.

Meanwhile, the governor in New South Wales, Captain Bligh of Bounty infamy, has been deposed in a feud with the local settlers. Jack is offered command of the old HMS Leopard for a mission to Australia to restore Bligh, which he accepts to escape his woes on land. Sir Joseph Blaine explains to Stephen that Mrs Wogan will be carried aboard the Leopard as a prisoner, along with two dozen other convicts to disguise the nature of the charges against her. Partly to prevent Stephen's laudanum addiction from compromising his work, Blaine assigns Maturin to the voyage to watch Wogan, hoping that by doing so he may uncover American secrets.

Shortly after embarking, the prisoners kill their superintendent and surgeon during a storm, and Stephen discovers the squalor of their captivity in the orlop. Jack orders their conditions be improved to meet naval standards but an outbreak of "gaol fever" (jail fever, now understood to be typhus) nonetheless spreads from the convicts to the seamen, killing most of the male prisoners and 116 of the ship's crew, leaving the Leopard severely undermanned. Stephen's assistant Mr Martin dies and is replaced by Michael Herapath, who has stowed away in pursuit of his lover, Mrs Wogan. Jack rates Herapath a midshipman despite his American citizenship. The ship is forced to leave many recovering crew members at Recife, including Tom Pullings. He is replaced with James Grant as first lieutenant, who proves a challenge for Captain Aubrey. While they are in port, HMS Nymph arrives damaged from an encounter with the Waakzaamheid, a Dutch 74-gun ship-of-the-line. Stephen fabricates a story that Mr Martin was a French agent in a letter that he deliberately leaves for Herapath and Wogan to read and copy, hoping the false information will confuse French and American intelligence.

The Leopard encounters the Dutch ship before reaching the Cape of Good Hope, but Jack cannot risk a confrontation with the much larger and fully manned Waakzaamheid. He repels a boarding party with grapeshot during the night and nearly escapes his pursuer, but the Dutch captain eerily predicts Jack's every move and blocks his route to the Cape. The Dutchman chases them south into the Roaring Forties for five days, where the waves and wind increase, and the ships finally engage in dangerously high seas. Casks of fresh water are jettisoned from the Leopard to lighten her. After a long exchange of fire Jack is struck in the head by a large splinter and knocked senseless. With the Waakzaamheid gaining on her, a lucky shot from the Leopard strikes her foremast, causing it to fall into the sea. Without its driving force the Waakzaamheid yaws onto her beam-ends in the trough of a deep wave and is overwhelmed by the next, sinking with all hands.

Now east of the Cape, the Leopard aims for New South Wales. Jack orders the crew to collect ice to replace their fresh water stores, but the ship strikes an iceberg stern-on, damaging the rudder and causing a severe leak. Desperate to save the ship, all hands work the pumps continuously for days and rush to fother a sail to stop the leak. Though Jack has been seriously wounded in the battle, he tries to quell rumors that his mind is unsound. Grant challenges Jack's fitness for command, requesting permission to take the Leopard's boats and the men who wish to leave and head for the Cape, which Jack accepts. Only the jolly boat is left behind. Jack and the crew members loyal to him continue to drift east on the Leopard, still rudderless and pumping furiously to keep her afloat. Making adroit use of anchors and a jury-rigged rudder, Jack navigates the ship to safe harbour in a bay of the remote, uninhabited, and poorly charted Desolation Island just as a storm approaches. Despite its name, it is full of fresh food in the rainy Antarctic summer.

The crew repairs the damage to the ship's hull but cannot fashion a mounting for a replacement rudder without the use of a forge, which had been cast overboard in the desperation to lighten the ship. Jack fears they will be stranded on the island through the winter. Stephen and Herapath collect samples of the local plant and animal life from a small island in the bay. After a few days a whaler arrives in the bay: it is the American brig La Fayette, returning to the island to resupply with the edible cabbages growing on shore, which they need to combat scurvy. The Americans have lost their surgeon and their captain is incapacitated by a painful toothache, but they have a working forge. A delicate situation arises when sentiment aboard the American ship proves hostile to the Royal Navy. Jack asks Stephen's advice, who suggests using Herapath as an envoy to the American captain. Stephen follows, and the pair provides medical care to all aboard. The Americans offer to pay but Stephen will not accept payment.

The next morning the forge is on the beach for the Leopard's use. Stephen advises Jack to resist any desire to press the British deserters serving aboard the whaler. Knowing that American citizens cannot be removed from an American ship without causing a diplomatic incident, Stephen sees a perfect way to speed his plan to undermine French intelligence, by deliberately letting Wogan and Herapath escape aboard the whaler carrying a packet of falsified information. Wogan is now pregnant with Herapath's child. Stephen gives them the opportunity to escape by suggesting that Herapath should perform the last health check on the American ship before it departs. The forge is returned and the La Fayette sails on the evening tide. While Jack is distracted by the ceremony of setting the new rudder in place, Stephen and Barret Bonden watch from a distance as Herapath and Wogan slip away in the night to board the whaler.

== Characters ==
- Jack Aubrey - Captain of HMS Leopard, and recently painted wearing the Order of the Bath, but he does not appear to have been awarded the knighthood as he does not use the title in this or subsequent books.
- Stephen Maturin - ship's surgeon, physician, intelligence agent, and friend to Jack.
- Sophia Williams - Jack's wife and mother of their three children, Charlotte, Fanny and young George.
- Mrs Williams - Jack's mother-in-law, now financially secure, with tenants in Mapes Court, choosing to live with her daughter and three grandchildren.
- Diana Villiers - first cousin to Sophia, and Stephen's love interest; recently returned from America.
- Sir Joseph Blaine - a senior figure in the Admiralty's espionage department, Maturin's colleague and a fellow naturalist.
- Mr Kimber - the schemer (projector) with a process to recover the lead and silver from "valuable dross" on Aubrey's land

At Craddock's for cards

- Andrew Wray - in the Patronage Office and the Treasury, involved with intelligence.
- Judge Wray - older cousin of Andrew Wray
- Mr Carroll – another player, friend of the Wrays
- Mr Jenyns – another player, friend of the Wrays
- Heneage Dundas – half-pay captain and long-time friend of Aubrey, stands up with him at challenge

At Ashgrove Cottage dinner

- Lieutenant Tom Pullings – Long time friend of Aubrey and Maturin, to be First Lieutenant on Leopard
- Captain Peter Heywood – as a young man was one of the mutineers of the Bounty under Lieutenant Bligh, then brought back to England by the cruel Captain Edwards on Pandora, spared from hanging due to his youth; sailed the Leopard a few years back.

On the Leopard

- Mr Martin - specialist in anatomy and assistant to Maturin, specifically chosen by him; recovers from gaol fever after treating so many on ship and documenting his own case, then dies from pneumonia.
- Mrs Louisa Wogan - American prisoner on board HMS Leopard, sentenced to transportation to New South Wales for espionage.
- Michael Herapath - an American stowaway and lover of Louisa Wogan. Aubrey saves his life when Herapath falls into the sea while trying to reach the royal masts, for which he is most grateful. He becomes Maturin's surgical assistant after the gaol fever epidemic.
- Mrs Boswell - prisoner on board HMS Leopard, pregnant, her child Leopardina is delivered by surgery during the battle with the Waakzaamheid; she also tells fortunes to the crew to bad effect, requiring Maturin's intervention.
- Barret Bonden - coxswain for Captain Aubrey, who also watches out for Maturin.
- James Grant - Second Lieutenant on HMS Leopard, whose book about a voyage in 1800 to New South Wales is read on board by the Captain and Dr Maturin; replaces Pullings when he is left in Recife to recover from gaol fever.
- Babbington - third lieutenant aboard the Leopard, with his Newfoundland dog. Acting second lieutenant after Recife.
- George Byron - midshipman aboard HMS Leopard, promoted to acting fourth lieutenant after the epidemic.
- Moore - Marine Captain on Leopard, skilled in gunnery, aims the shot that hits the foremast of the Waakzaamheid.
- John C Howard - Marine Lieutenant of the Leopard who plays the flute exceptionally well, murdered by Larkin in 41 degrees south latitude.
- Larkin - master of the Leopard, frequently drunk, considers himself a Jonah, leaves with Grant.
- Rev Mr Fisher - chaplain on the Leopard, proves of no help in the epidemic and entirely self-centered as the challenges of the voyage continue.
- Faster Doudle - one of the prime seamen who trades their lime juice-laced rum for tobacco after the steering oar breaks approaching the Crozet Islands, thus bringing on scurvy until treated by Maturin.
- David Allan - acting bosun after Grant parts from Leopard; he is essential in the task of anchoring in the bay at Desolation Island.

On the American whaler, the brig La Fayette of Nantucket, Massachusetts

- Captain Winthrop Putnam - American captain of whaler, suffers from a debilitating toothache, unfriendly to the English.
- Mr Reuben Hyde - first mate who leaves note at cove about the cabbages.

== Ships ==
- British
  - HMS Leopard - 50-gun
  - HMS Nymph - 32-gun
- Dutch
  - Waakzaamheid - 74-gun
- American
  - La Fayette - whaling brig

== Reviews ==
Kirkus Reviews noted the "usual action" present in Desolation Island compared to other nautical novels, and praised O'Brian's "literate, clear-eyed realism", which may broaden the audience for the novel beyond the usual readers of a story set on sailing ships. Reviewing a later book in the series for the Los Angeles Times, Anthony Day glowingly recalled Desolation Island, writing, "Aubrey's relentless pursuit of the Dutch warship Waakzaamheid in the roaring ocean below the southern tip of Africa, day after day in frightful weather, stirs the emotions of dread and hope in every reader."

== Allusions/references to history, culture and geography ==
The Leopard stops for water and fresh supplies in Saint Jago, one of the Cape Verde islands, west of Senegal and in Aubrey's time a colony of Portugal. In the nineteenth century, the name Saint Jago was used instead of the modern Santiago.

The real-life Leopard's earlier involvement in the Chesapeake–Leopard Affair in 1807 is described in the novel. The appearance of the American whaler reveals the tension between the English and the Americans on the eve of the War of 1812. O'Brian based the account of the near-sinking of the Leopard, after striking an iceberg, on an actual event involving HMS Guardian and her commander Edward Riou in 1789.

The novel uses Lieutenant James Grant as the model for the fictional second lieutenant Grant, who parts from the Leopard when the situation is most grim. The real Grant was promoted to commander in 1805, and this story takes place about 1811. Despite his early success as captain of sloops, the real Grant's career was not followed by anything more than the promotion to commander, though he was years older than Jack Aubrey, so he provides a good base for the fictional lieutenant who would much rather be the captain.

Captain William Bligh's governorship of New South Wales is mentioned as the motive for Aubrey's mission, though Aubrey does not reach New South Wales during the novel, nor meets Bligh in any part of the story. Aubrey does tell Maturin how Bligh is viewed by the Royal Navy, the point of which is that his storytelling foreshadows how Aubrey handles his crew after the Dutch ship sinks and their ship hits the iceberg, and how Aubrey handles Lieutenant Grant, turning a potential mutiny into an officially condoned parting of ways. In addition, Aubrey and Maturin speak with Captain Peter Heywood, who served aboard the Bounty during the mutiny and was later recovered from Pitcairn Island by Captain Edwards, sent to fetch the mutineers back.

The reason why Bligh is in trouble in the moment of the novel is also described. In short, Bligh faced another mutiny, but this time by staff under him as Governor of the colony of New South Wales. Captain Heywood offers the explanation that Bligh seemed not to understand the reactions of others to many things he said, and then to react too harshly, which those around him perceived as harsh criticism and a miserable life. The Rum Rebellion, also known as the Rum Puncheon Rebellion, of 1808 was the only successful armed takeover of government in Australia's recorded history. As Governor of New South Wales, William Bligh was deposed by the New South Wales Corps under the command of Major George Johnston, working closely with John Macarthur, on 26 January 1808. Afterwards, acting governors were sworn in until the arrival from Britain of Major-General Lachlan Macquarie at the beginning of 1810.

From the book, Desolation Island is geographically close to the Kerguelen Islands. However, in a later book, The Thirteen Gun Salute, O'Brian writes some dialogue between Richardson and Aubrey that explicitly states that Kerguelen Island is not Desolation Island: "'Kerguelen is what some people call Desolation Island, is it not, sir?' asked Richardson. 'So they do. But it is not our Desolation Island, which is smaller, farther south and east.'" Despite the dialogue in The Thirteen Gun Salute, the description of the harbor where the Leopard seeks shelter is taken exactly from Captain Cook's description of Christmas Harbor, in the far northwest corner of Kerguelen, which he mapped with the assistance of his sailing master, William Bligh, on his last voyage.

One reader and amateur critic argued that the novel reprised an ancient theme in religion and mythology, that of descent and redemption. In this view, Jack and Stephen are disgraced in the Overworld, Jack by ruinous investments, card games and quarrels, Stephen by losing a patient, falling from favor with naval intelligence, and above all, by losing Diana. They journey to the Underworld, below the equator, to the high southern latitudes, experience epic trials, and achieve redemption at Desolation Island. This paper, "Allegory Wrestling, or Desolation Island Decoded", was originally posted on the Gunroom email list, devoted to the Aubrey-Maturin series, and presented at a panel on Patrick O'Brian and the series at a popular culture conference in Boston in 1998.

== Relation to other novels in the series ==
Desolation Island differs from the prior novels in the series in that the main characters are not back in England or safely on their way by the end of the story. This novel ends with Aubrey and Maturin still on Desolation Island at the end of the Antarctic summer, having just floated the ship and installed the rudder, far from home and from the intended destination for their original mission, with a part of the crew having already separated to try to navigate to the Cape in small boats. The reader does not know if the original mission will be completed or how they will get home to England until the next novel, The Fortune of War, or a yet later novel. As in previous novels, several characters are introduced who appear in later novels. Many of the characters appear in the next novel, The Fortune of War, and some appear in several novels before their story is told (e.g. Andrew Wray).

== Film and music adaptation ==
The novel is one of several novels in the series whose themes were incorporated into the 2003 film Master and Commander: The Far Side of the World.

The American folksinger Jed Marum wrote and recorded the song "Desolation Island" in 2001, based on the book.

== Publication history ==
- 1978 Collins Hardback First edition ISBN 0-00-222145-4
- 1979, March Stein & Day; Hardcover edition First USA edition ISBN 0-8128-2590-X
- 1979 Fontana / Collins; Paperback edition ISBN 0-00-615586-3 / 978-0-00-615586-7 (UK edition)
- 1981 Day Books; 1st Mass-market Paperback ISBN 0812870662 edition
- 1991 W. W. Norton & Company Paperback Reprint edition ISBN 039330812X (USA edition)
- 1994 W. W. Norton & Company Hardcover Reprint edition ISBN 0393037053 (USA edition)
- 1998, May HarperCollins hardback ISBN 0-00-222145-4 / 978-0-00-222145-0 (UK edition)
- 2001, January Thorndike Press Hardcover Large-print edition ISBN 0-7862-1926-2 / 978-0-7862-1926-1 (USA edition)
- 2001, January Chivers Large Print hardback ISBN 0-7540-1544-0 / 978-0-7540-1544-4 (UK edition)
- 2004 Blackstone Audiobooks Unabridged Audio CD edition ISBN 0786183993
- 1993 Recorded Books Audio CD edition, narrator Patrick Tull, ISBN 1-4025-3930-4 / 978-1-4025-3930-5 (USA edition)
- 2011 W. W. Norton & Company e-Book ISBN 0393088529 (USA edition)
- 2011 Harper e-book (UK edition)

This novel was first published by Stein & Day in the USA. Fontana / Collins issued a paperback in the same year, 1979. W W Norton issued a reprint 12 years after the initial publication as part of its reissue in paperback of all the novels in the series prior to 1991.

The process of reissuing the novels initially published prior to 1991 was in full swing in 1991, as the whole series gained a new and wider audience, as Mark Howowitz describes in writing about The Nutmeg of Consolation, the fourteenth novel in the series and initially published in 1991.

Two of my favorite friends are fictitious characters; they live in more than a dozen volumes always near at hand. Their names are Jack Aubrey and Stephen Maturin, and their creator is a 77-year-old novelist named Patrick O'Brian, whose 14 books about them have been continuously in print in England since the first, "Master and Commander," was published in 1970. O'Brian's British fans include T. J. Binyon, Iris Murdoch, A. S. Byatt, Timothy Mo and the late Mary Renault, but, until recently, this splendid saga of two serving officers in the British Royal Navy during the Napoleonic Wars was unavailable in this country, apart from the first few installments which went immediately out of print. Last year, however, W. W. Norton decided to reissue the series in its entirety, and so far nine of the 14 have appeared here, including the most recent chapter, The Nutmeg of Consolation.
