= Post Captain (novel) =

1972 novel by Patrick O'Brian

- First edition (UK)
- Author: Patrick O'Brian
- Cover artist: Dell'Orco
- Language: English
- Series: Aubrey–Maturin series
- Genre: Historical novel
- Publisher: Collins (UK); Lippincott (US)
- Publication date: 1972
- Publication place: United Kingdom
- Media type: Print
- Pages: 414 first edition
- ISBN: 0-00-221657-4 first edition hardback
- OCLC: 38885590
- Dewey Decimal: 823/.9/14
- LC Class: PZ3.O1285 Po PR6029.B55
- Preceded by: Master and Commander
- Followed by: HMS Surprise

Post Captain is the second historical novel in the Aubrey–Maturin series by Patrick O'Brian, first published in 1972. It features the characters of Captain Jack Aubrey and naval surgeon Stephen Maturin, and is set in the early 19th century during the Napoleonic Wars.

During the brief Peace of Amiens, Aubrey and Maturin live in a country house in England, where they meet women with whom they fall in love. The mores of courtship restrict both men as to making marriage proposals. Then their lives are turned upside down when Aubrey loses his money due to decisions of the prize court and a dishonest prize-agent. To avoid seizure for debt, they proceed through France to Maturin's property in Spain. When the war begins afresh, Aubrey has a command aboard HMS Polychrest, gaining fewer prizes yet succeeding in his military goals. He is eventually promoted and is given temporary command of the frigate HMS Lively while its captain is ashore. The emotions of his love life interfere with his ways at sea, showing him sharply different in his decisiveness at sea compared to his clumsiness on land.

The novel was received well at its initial publishing, but received more and better notice after its re-issue in 1990. That much of the story is set on land drew some to consider it O'Brian's homage to Jane Austen, one of his favorite authors. Author Mary Renault gave the novel high praise, while Alison Sulentic commended it for the two different ways that Maturin and Aubrey "come to know wisdom" as a result of falling in love.

== Plot summary ==
With the Peace of Amiens, Jack Aubrey returns to England and rents a house with Stephen Maturin, with shipmates running the household, and the friends spending their time fox hunting. They meet the Williams family, who live on a neighboring estate. Aubrey courts Sophia Williams, the eldest of three daughters, while Maturin pursues Diana Villiers, Sophia's cousin. Jack wants to marry Sophia, but they delay making a firm engagement. His fortune disappears when his prize-agent absconds with his funds and the prize court finds that two merchant ships he had captured were owned by neutral nations. The court demands he repay the value of the ships (rather than gain the prize money he expected), a sum beyond his means. Mrs Williams takes her daughters away to Bath on this news. Jack also dallies with Diana, straining his friendship with Stephen and showing himself indecisive on land, in contrast to his decisive ways at sea. Aubrey and Maturin flee England to avoid Aubrey being taken for debt.

In Toulon to visit Christy Pallière, the French captain who had captured Aubrey's first command Sophie before the peace, they learn that a renewal of the war is imminent. French authorities round up all English subjects. Jack and Stephen escape over the Pyrenees to Stephen's property in Catalonia, with Stephen disguised as an itinerant bear trainer and Jack as the bear, Flora. They reach Gibraltar, where Jack and Stephen take passage aboard a merchant ship of the British East India Company, the Lord Nelson. The ship is captured by the French privateer Bellone, but a British squadron overtakes them and rescues Aubrey, Maturin, and the other passengers.

In England, Jack is offered a letter of marque by Mr Canning, a wealthy Jewish merchant. At the same gathering at Queeney's, Mrs Williams and her daughter Cecilia are among the guests. Unaware Jack would be there, Sophia had stayed home with her sister Frances. Mrs Williams learns of Stephen's castle in Spain and his training as a physician, raising his status in her eyes. An inadequate thief approaches Jack as he walks outdoors; this Mr Scriven proves to be a useful friend, knowing the law of debt and where Jack can be safe from bailiffs. Aubrey and Maturin move to The Grapes, safe in the Liberty of the Savoy.

Offered command of HMS Polychrest, Jack turns Canning down. Polychrest is an oddly designed ship that was purpose-built as an experimental weapon, though the project is now abandoned and the Admiralty has tried to refit her for ordinary service. She is structurally weak and sails poorly, and the first lieutenant, Parker, is liberal with his punishments of the crew. Jack asks that Tom Pullings be promoted to lieutenant. Jack is given a free hand by Admiral Harte, who stands to benefit personally from any prizes taken. To Harte's disappointment, Jack captures no prizes. When he drives the French privateer Bellone aground outside a Spanish port, the merchants reward him. Harte then assigns Jack to escort convoys in the English Channel. Jack gains a reputation for lingering in port as he carries on a furtive affair with Diana. Meanwhile, Stephen is sent on an intelligence-gathering mission in Spain. On his return, Stephen is advised by Jack's friend Heneage Dundas to warn Jack about his reputation with the Admiralty. When Stephen does so, Jack gets angry, their competition over Diana is acknowledged, and the two agree to fight a duel. Jack calls on Diana, but finds her with Canning, ending Jack's interest in her.

Jack is ordered to raid the French port of Chaulieu to sink the French troopships and gunboats gathered there and to destroy the Fanciulla. The crew plans to mutiny because of their harsh treatment under Parker, but Stephen overhears their plans and warns Jack. Jack rues his angry words with Stephen, and then quashes the mutiny by putting the instigators and some loyal crew in a ship's boat and quickly beginning the attack. During the engagement, Polychrest runs aground between two enemy batteries. Jack leads three of the ship's boats to board and capture Fanciulla. The successful party then attempts to refloat Polychrest, which founders after leaving Chaulieu, and the crew transfer to Fanciulla. After the battle, Stephen and Jack, who has been seriously wounded in the battle, resume their friendship.

Aubrey returns to England in Fanciulla and is promoted to post-captain. With debt still hanging over him, he asks for any available command. He is assigned as acting captain for HMS Lively, whose Captain Hamond has taken leave to sit in Parliament. Returning from Spain, Maturin tells the head of naval intelligence, Sir Joseph Blaine, that the Spanish will formally enter the war in alliance with France as soon as four ships full of bullion from Montevideo arrive safely in Cádiz. At Stephen's urging, Sophia asks Jack to transport her and her sister to the Downs. Though Jack is too poor to propose a marriage settlement satisfactory to Mrs Williams, Jack and Sophia come to an agreement not to marry anyone else. Stephen is close friends with Sophia but does not take her advice to propose to Diana. While attending the opera, he sees that Diana is being kept by Canning, and his pain is deep.

Maturin takes no pay for his intelligence work but does ask a favour: that Lively be included in the squadron sent to intercept the Spanish treasure fleet. The Admiralty agrees and asks Stephen to negotiate the fleet's surrender. Stephen is given a temporary naval rank; because of this and his connection to the Admiralty, Jack realizes that Stephen has been involved in intelligence work for Britain. Jack understands that there is a side of his friend that he did not know. The Spanish convoy refuses to surrender, and battle breaks out. One Spanish frigate (the Mercedes) explodes, and the other three (Fama, Clara, and Medea) surrender. Clara strikes her colours to Lively, pleasing Jack, but Fama, carrying the bulk of the Spanish treasure, attempts to escape to Cádiz; Lively pursues and captures her. Jack invites two of the Spanish captains to dinner, along with Dr Maturin, and they all toast Sophia.

== Principal characters ==
- Jack Aubrey: Commander of Polychrest and later appointed captain of HMS Lively.
- Stephen Maturin: Ship's surgeon, natural philosopher, friend to Jack and intelligence officer; son of Irish and Catalan parents, knows both countries well.
- Sophia Williams: Eldest daughter of three, fair-haired beauty of strong character, who lives in the neighborhood where Jack Aubrey takes a house during the brief peace. Aubrey falls in love with her but is indecisive with her in contrast to his decisive nature at sea.
- Mrs Williams: Mother of Sophia, Cecilia, and Frances Williams, widowed. She is protective of her daughters while working to find a suitable husband for each. An unpleasant personality.
- Diana Villiers: Same age cousin of Sophia Williams, both orphaned and widowed in India, now living with her Williams cousins. Both Stephen Maturin and Jack Aubrey are attracted to her dark-haired beauty and abrupt ways. Stephen surprises himself that he can fall in love again.
- Earl Saint Vincent: First Lord of the Admiralty when Aubrey first requests a ship, after prize court decisions go against him. He does not have enough ships at hand.
- General Aubrey: Father of Jack Aubrey. He recently married his dairymaid, and they have a son about the time Jack Aubrey learns of his debt due to the adverse prize court decision. The general lives at Woolcombe, is a member of parliament, and speaks out too often, and against the Royal Navy, thus against his son's career advancement.
- Sir Joseph Blaine: Head of naval intelligence, Stephen Maturin's contact at the Admiralty, and an entomologist.
- Christy Pallière: Captain of the French ship that took Sophie, with cousins in Bath whom Jack Aubrey visited when also visiting Sophia. He is affable and sociable, and a good ship captain.
- Dr Ramis: French ship's surgeon and contact for Maturin in Toulon.
- Dumanoir de Plessy: Captain of the French privateer Bellone, wounded while taking the Lord Nelson. Maturin treats his wounds, yielding kinder treatment to the passengers now prisoners on his prize.
- Azéma: Second captain from Bellone, captain aboard the prize Lord Nelson merchant ship, who struck his colors on meeting four Royal Navy ships of the line.
- Mr Adam Scriven: An unemployed literary man and translator who instructs Aubrey and Maturin in the laws of debt and the safe haven of the Duchy of Lancaster, the Liberty of the Savoy in the midst of London.
- Mrs Broad: Runs The Grapes, the inn in the Savoy, where Aubrey is safe from bailiffs wanting to take him for debt. He and Maturin set up there.
- Lord Keith: Admiral in the Royal Navy, married to Queeney.
- Queeney: Wife of Lord Keith, and in earlier days, neighbour and tutor to young Jack Aubrey, who hosts a gathering where Aubrey and Maturin meet Canning, as well as Diana Villiers, Mrs Williams and Cecilia.
- Heneage Dundas: Close friend of Jack Aubrey who is already made post captain, into HMS Franchise, when he meets Aubrey and Maturin at Queeeney's "rout" (large evening party).
- Mr Richard Canning: Wealthy trader with a fleet of merchant ships. He offers Aubrey a position as captain on his new privateering ship built like the Bellone. A married man, he pursues Diana Villiers, who goes into keeping with him.
- Lord Melville: First Lord of the Admiralty when war resumes. His political support is the opposition to those who supported his predecessor, Lord Saint Vincent.
- Admiral Harte: He has a squadron in the Downs, to which the Polychrest is attached. He has a strong grudge against Aubrey.
- Mr Parker: First Lieutenant in Polychrest, he is cruel and excessive in handing out punishments, which nearly results in a mutiny on the Polychrest. He had sailed with Prince William (Duke of Clarence), who pressed Lord Melville about his friend's progress. Ironically, Aubrey's good word about him helps him gain his step at age 56 to master and commander on the Fanciulla, bought into service after capture.
- Mr Tom Pullings: Young Second Lieutenant in Polychrest, promoted from master's mate, after his stint with the British East India Company during the peace, on the ship Lord Nelson, which Aubrey and Maturin board at Gibraltar.
- Mr and Mrs Pullings: Parents of Tom who bring the food for the feast in Gosport to celebrate his promotion to lieutenant. Mrs Pullings brings her specialty savory pheasant pie, so good that she and Maturin talk at length about the tasty truffles she includes in it.
- Mr William Babbington: Midshipman in Polychrest who injures his left arm in the taking of the Fanciulla.
- Mr Parslow: Young midshipman aboard Polychrest.
- Barret Bonden: Coxswain from HM Sloop Sophie who joins Aubrey on HMS Polychrest and is brought aboard HMS Lively.
- Joe Plaice: Cousin to Bonden who signs on to the crew of the Polychrest.
- Preserved Killick: Servant to Aubrey aboard HMS Polychrest and one of the only crewman he can take aboard HMS Lively as a jobbing captain.
- James MacDonald: Reliable first lieutenant of Marines on Polychrest, until he loses part of his left arm in the attack of Bellone, recuperating in the naval hospital under Maturin's care. He has extensive conversations with Maturin on many topics, and loans his fine pistols to Maturin for the duel that never happens.
- Smithers: Lieutenant of Marines replacing MacDonald aboard Polychrest, independently wealthy, who loses to Maturin at cards, but supports Aubrey at the time of the threatened mutiny.
- Captain Hamond: Regular captain of HMS Lively, recently a member of parliament, who takes a leave of absence to engage in political activities, leaving the vacancy for Aubrey.
- Mr Simmons: First lieutenant aboard HMS Lively, a well-run frigate. He is prize captain of Clara.
- Mr Dashwood: Another lieutenant aboard HMS Lively. His sister and nephew take a ride to meet her husband, carried as a favour, similar to the ride Sophia and Cecilia Williams take to the Downs from Plymouth. He is on duty when the Fama strikes her colours. He is assigned prize captain of that ship.
- Don José Bustamente: Admiral of the Spanish squadron, with his flag on the Medea, carrying treasures from the River Plate to Cádiz. The Royal Navy decides to intercept this squadron, hoping it will strike colors in the face of British force.
- Don Ignacio: Captain of the Clara, taken aboard HMS Lively when Clara strikes her colours.
- Graham Moore: Commodore of the British squadron and captain of HMS Indefatigable pursuing the Spanish squadron. He is impatient for action when the negotiations for surrender seem not to succeed.
- Sutton: Captain of HMS Amphion in the British squadron to intercept the Real Armada (Spanish Royal Navy) squadron before it reaches Cádiz.

== Ships ==
The British

- HMS Polychrest – sloop of fiction
- HMS Amethyst – frigate
- HMS Lively – 38-gun frigate
- HMS Indefatigable – 40-gun frigate
- HMS Medusa – 32-gun frigate
- HMS Amphion – 32-gun frigate
- Lord Nelson – East Indiaman

The French

- Fanciulla – corvette
- Bellone (privateer)

The Spanish

- Medea – 40-gun frigate
- Fama – 34-gun frigate
- Clara – 34-gun frigate
- Mercedes – 34-gun frigate

== O'Brian's sources ==
=== Historical ===
Stephen Maturin, in presenting his radical position against the tyranny of the navy, says that he would "certainly have joined the mutineers" had he been at the Spithead Mutiny.

The Treaty of Amiens was signed 25 March 1802 by Joseph Bonaparte and the Marquess Cornwallis as a "Definitive Treaty of Peace". The consequent Peace of Amiens lasted only one year, ending on 18 May 1803. It was the only period of general peace in Europe during the so-called 'Great French War' between 1793 and 1815. Captain Christy-Pallière, whom Jack and Stephen visit at Toulon, was a real French Navy officer who did command the naval base at Toulon, though not in 1803.

For a few hundred years beginning in the 14th century, the Duchy of Lancaster was not subject to the King's laws, including pursuit for debt, having its own courts, laws and power of decision. Savoy was part of the lands in that Duchy. Though it was adjacent to the City of London and to Westminster, the Liberty of the Savoy, sometimes called the Liberties of the Savoy, was a safe haven from debt collectors acting under the King's law until sometime in the 19th century, after the Napoleonic Wars. The author explained this from his own knowledge at a publisher's web page.

The novel describes the political tensions between Lord Melville, First Lord of the Admiralty with the support of Prime Minister Pitt, and the Whigs, whose First Lord had been Earl St Vincent, immediate predecessor to Lord Melville. The Whigs charged Lord Melville with misappropriation of public funds. The novel posits that Melville could not properly defend himself because the funds in question were associated with the secret appropriations for intelligence gathering while he was Treasurer in the Admiralty. At the end of the novel, Lord Melville still holds his position while the impeachment and trial occur in the House of Lords. Lord Melville was acquitted in real life, but did not hold the office of First Lord again; his son Robert held the post later in the Napoleonic Wars. Like his father, he is portrayed as being in favor of the fictional Captain Aubrey.

The last action in the novel is based on a real action, the Battle of Cape Santa Maria on 5 October 1804, in which four British frigates – HMS Indefatigable, HMS Lively, HMS Medusa, and HMS Amphion – successfully intercepted a Spanish flotilla carrying gold from South America, leaving from the mouth of the River Plate in present-day Montevideo, Uruguay. Captain Hamond, later Sir Graham Hamond, 2nd Baronet, was not in fact a member of parliament and was in command of Lively during the action, taking the Spanish ships as Aubrey does in the novel.

=== Literature ===
In a conversation with MacDonald, Stephen Maturin argues about the various qualities of the Gaelic poet Ossian's writing and authenticity. This references similar controversy which had arisen during the period about the true authorship of James Macpherson's translation of his epic cycle, and continues to be questioned today in literary circles. In this same conversation, MacDonald references the Roman legal principle "falsum in uno, falsum in omnibus", which translates to "false in one thing, false in all things".

== Publication history ==
Geoff Hunt cover used on reissues

Post Captain was first published by Lippincott in the US and Collins in the UK, both in 1972. W W Norton issued a reprint in the USA 18 years after the initial publication as part of its reissue in paperback of all the novels in the series prior to 1991. The novel has been in print since the re-issue, and also released in e-book and audiobook formats, in response to continuing interest in the novel.

The process of reissuing the novels initially published prior to 1991 was in full swing in 1991, as the whole series gained a new and wider audience, as Mark Howowitz describes in writing about The Nutmeg of Consolation, the fourteenth novel in the series, which was first published in 1991.

Two of my favorite friends are fictitious characters; they live in more than a dozen volumes always near at hand. Their names are Jack Aubrey and Stephen Maturin, and their creator is a 77-year-old novelist named Patrick O'Brian, whose 14 books about them have been continuously in print in England since the first, "Master and Commander," was published in 1970. O'Brian's British fans include T. J. Binyon, Iris Murdoch, A. S. Byatt, Timothy Mo and the late Mary Renault, but, until recently, this splendid saga of two serving officers in the British Royal Navy during the Napoleonic Wars was unavailable in this country, apart from the first few installments which went immediately out of print. Last year, however, W. W. Norton decided to reissue the series in its entirety, and so far nine of the 14 have appeared here, including the most recent chapter, The Nutmeg of Consolation.

== Literary significance and criticism ==
"One of the finest seafaring novels of the Napoleonic wars." – R. W., Taranaki Herald (New Zealand), on Post Captain

Mary Renault had high praise for the novel:

Master and Commander raised almost dangerously high expectations, Post Captain triumphantly surpasses them. Mr O'Brian is a master of his period, in which his characters are finely placed, while remaining three-dimensional, thoroughly human beings. This book sets him at the very top of his genre; he does not just have the chief qualifications of a first-class historical novelist, he has them all. The action scenes are superb; towards the end, far from being aware that one is reading what is, physically, a fairly long book, one notes with dismay that there is not much more to come....A brilliant book.

Library Journal found this to be a "rich blend of adventure, romance, and intrigue", reviewing an audiobook version read by John Lee and "Recommended for most collections."

Frank Prial wrote about Post Captain, in an article in The New York Times about the author in 1998, that "The Aubrey-Maturin series has been said to rival the sequential novels of Trollope and Anthony Powell. Mr O'Brian is particularly pleased when he is compared to Jane Austen, whom he reveres as the finest of all English novelists. First editions of most of her novels share shelf space in his small library here with first editions of Gibbon and Dr. Johnson and a battered but still useful 1810 edition of the Encyclopædia Britannica. The second book of the series, Post Captain, set mostly in country houses and as much a novel of manners as a sea story, has been said to be Mr. O'Brian's homage to Ms. Austen."

In an article published in a maritime law journal, Alison Sulentic proposes that "As inviting as Master and Commander may be, however, it is Post Captain, the second novel in the series, that unveils O'Brian's genius and stakes his claim to recognition as the author of "the best historical novels ever written." The intricate interweaving of plot lines that trace the personal and professional fortunes of the main characters crosses many of the more traditional categorizations of popular fiction." Sulentic assesses the plot in some detail against moral philosophy and the notions of 'the law as it is' and 'the law as it ought to be', and the development of Aubrey and Maturin in Post Captain, saying on page 588, "Over the course of Post Captain, both Jack and Stephen come to know wisdom in a way that profoundly alters the approach each takes to the intersection of law and morality." She mentions on page 589 the felicitous choice of names, perhaps a "deliberate conceit", for the ship Aubrey loves, HMS Sophie and the woman he loves, Sophia, and the name Sophia meaning wisdom.

In a more recent review, author Jo Walton finds this the book in the series with the poorest plot structure ("broken-backed") though complimenting the characters and incidents. The particular incident of the duel that did not happen between Aubrey and Maturin is noted: "The duel and then the fact that they never mention that they've reconciled feels very strange." She notes a scene worth praise for showing the themes of life on land versus life at sea, where Aubrey "runs from the bailiffs back to sea and calls back "Mr Pullings, press that man!" He presses the bailiffs who have come to arrest him for debt!

== Bibliography ==
- A.E. Cunningham, ed. (1994). Patrick O'Brian: A Bibliography and Critical Appreciation. British Library Publishing Division. ISBN 0-7123-1071-1.
- Anne Chotzinoff Grossman, Lisa Grossman Thomas (2000). Lobscouse and Spotted Dog: Which Is a Gastronomic Companion to the Aubrey/Maturin Novels. W W Norton & Co Ltd. ISBN 0-393-32094-4.
- Dean King (2001). A Sea of Words: Lexicon and Companion for Patrick O'Brian's Seafaring Tales. Henry Holt. ISBN 0-8050-6615-2.
- Dean King (2001). Harbors and High Seas: Map Book and Geographical Guide to the Aubrey/Maturin Novels of Patrick O'Brian. Henry Holt. ISBN 0-8050-6614-4.
- Brian Lavery (2003). Jack Aubrey Commands: An Historical Companion to the Naval World of Patrick O'Brian. Conway Maritime. ISBN 0-85177-946-8.
- David Miller (2003). The World of Jack Aubrey: Twelve-Pounders, Frigates, Cutlasses, and Insignia of His Majesty's Royal Navy. Running Press Book Publishers. ISBN 0-7624-1652-1.
- Richard O'Neill (2003). Patrick O'Brian's Navy: The Illustrated Companion to Jack Aubrey's World. Running Press. ISBN 0-7624-1540-1.
- Sulentic, Alison M. (2003). "Law and Morality in Patrick O'Brian's Post Captain" (PDF). Journal of Maritime Law and Commerce. 34: 583.
