= George Murray, 6th Lord Elibank =

Royal Navy officer and hereditary peer

Rear-Admiral The Right Honourable The Lord Elibank
- Died: 11 November 1785
- Military career
- Allegiance: United Kingdom
- Branch: Royal Navy
- Rank: Rear-Admiral
- Commands: HMS Tryall; HMS Wager; HMS Pearl; HMS Hampshire; HMS Revenge; HMS Trydent; HMS Duke

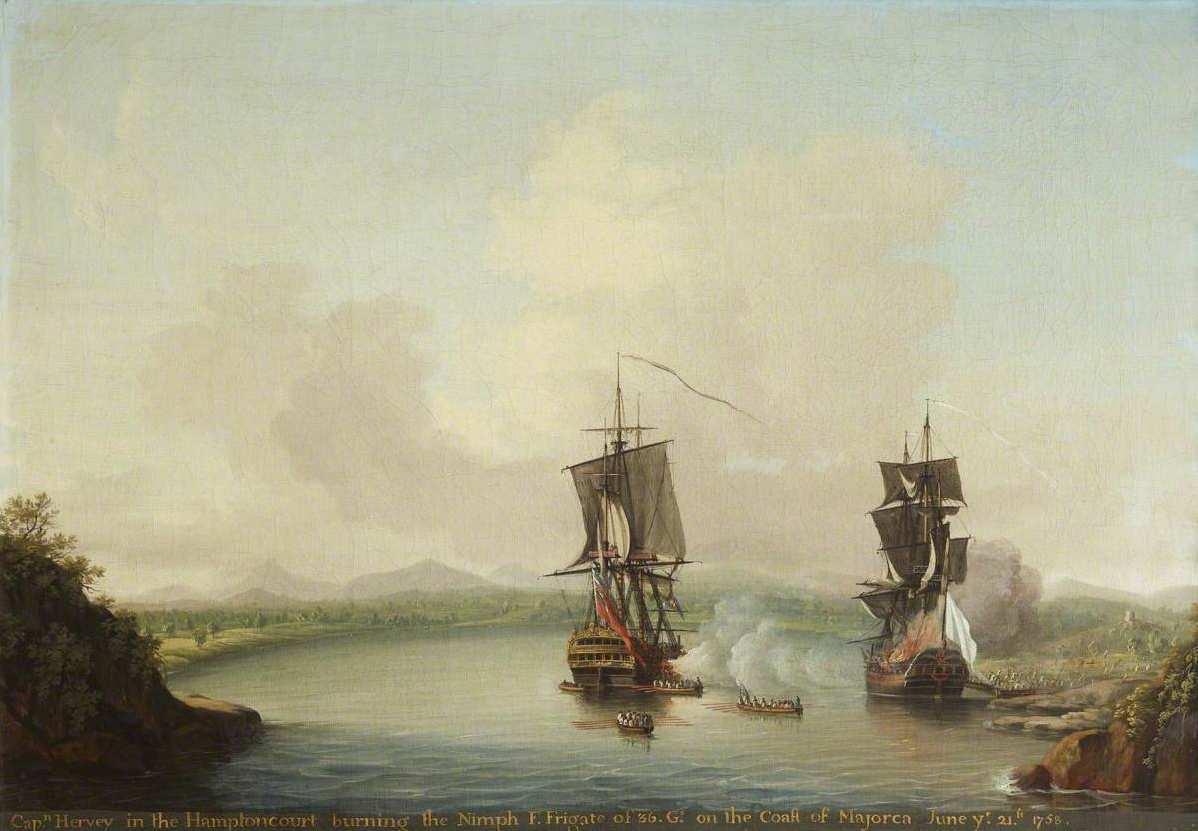
HMS Hampton Court in 1709

Rear-Admiral George Murray, 6th Lord Elibank (died 11 November 1785) was a British naval officer. He joined the Royal Navy in the early 1720s and fought in the Battle of Porto Bello in 1739 as a lieutenant on board the ship of the line HMS Hampton Court. Murray was promoted to commander in 1740 and given command of the sloop HMS Tryall to take part in George Anson's voyage around the world. A series of illnesses and deaths in Anson's squadron meant that by early 1741 Murray had been promoted to post captain and given command of the frigate HMS Pearl. Pearl and another ship lost contact with Anson in April of that year and after taking heavy damage and casualties through storms and sickness, sought safety in Rio de Janeiro before sailing for England.

Murray continued in the navy after this, receiving a number of different commands including the ship of the line HMS Hampshire in which he served in the Mediterranean Sea and English Channel. While in command of the ship of the line HMS Duke in 1756 he retired from active naval service. He was promoted as a superannuated rear-admiral shortly after this. He inherited the title Lord Elibank when his elder brother died in 1778.

== Early life ==
George Murray was born the second son of Alexander Murray, 4th Lord Elibank and his wife Elizabeth. (Note: John Charnock names his father as 'George' Murray, but this seems to be a mistake.) His brother was Gen. James Murray, first Governor of Quebec.

== Naval career ==
=== Early service ===
Murray joined the Royal Navy as a volunteer on board the frigate HMS Lyme on 8 January in either 1721 or 1722. He was promoted to midshipman on Lyme on 9 January in either 1723 or 1724 before passing his examination for lieutenant on 2 February in the following year. His first appointment as a lieutenant came when he was assigned as fourth lieutenant of the ship of the line HMS Orford at the Nore on 5 May 1727, where he served until 31 July 1728. On 1 August he was appointed second lieutenant of the frigate HMS Ludlow Castle on board which he served for over a year completing "secret service" duties, leaving on 13 September 1729 when she was paid off.

After a short period ashore Murray was again employed, this time as third lieutenant of the frigate HMS Princess Louisa in the Mediterranean Sea from 8 July 1730 until 2 July 1731, when he transferred to the ship of the line HMS Captain as her second lieutenant, initially still in the Mediterranean but from July 1732 in the English Channel. Murray stayed in Captain until 5 March 1735 or 1736, although he had been relegated to third lieutenant in June 1732, when he moved to become third lieutenant of the ship of the line HMS Princess Caroline serving in Admiral of the Fleet Sir John Norris' fleet off the Tagus.

HMS Hampton Court on the right with red swallowtail pennant, at the Battle of Porto Bello

On 9 December 1737 Murray became second lieutenant of the ship of the line HMS Hampton Court which sailed for the West Indies in 1738 as the flagship of Commodore Charles Brown. As such Murray participated in Hampton Court in the Battle of Porto Bello on 20 November 1739; she created so much smoke from the frequent firing of her guns at a gun battery that the other ships of the fleet at one point thought she was on fire.

Murray was promoted to commander on 24 July 1740 and given command of the sloop HMS Tryall in August. Tryall joined the squadron of Commodore George Anson which was sent to the South Seas for Anson's voyage around the world. They sailed from England on 18 September.

=== Post-captain ===
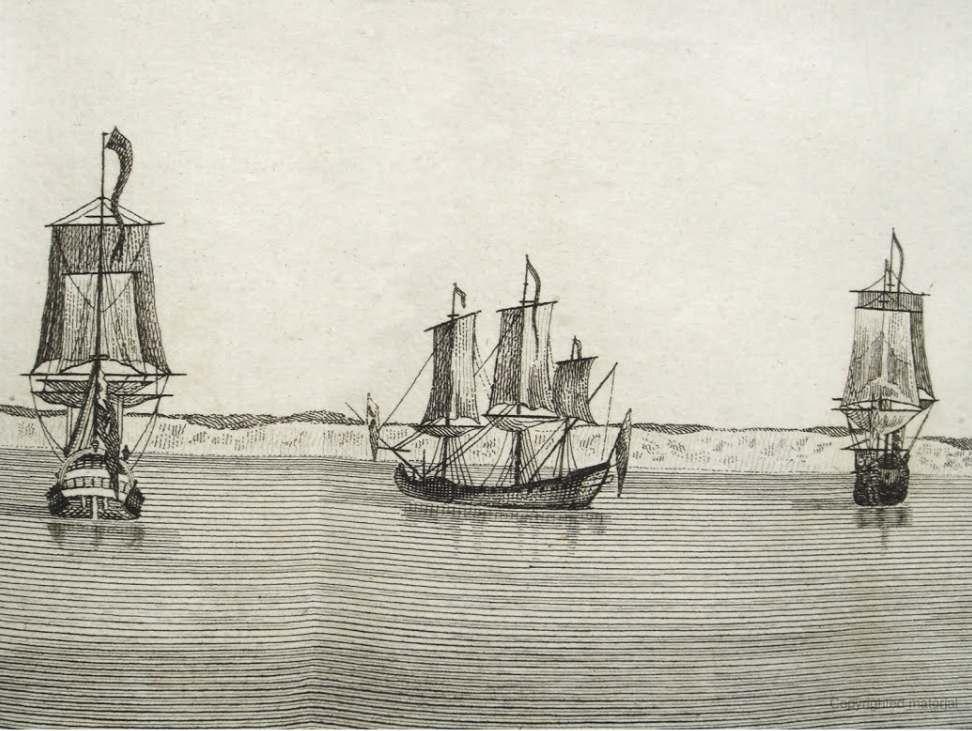
Lieutenant Piercy Brett's sketch of HMS Centurion, HMS Wager, and HMS Pearl, off Cape Virgin Mary, on 7 March 1741

On 3 November 1740 the squadron arrived at Madeira and the captain of the ship of the line HMS Gloucester left to return to England; this resulted in a series of promotions to fill the vacancy and Murray was promoted to post-captain and given command of the frigate HMS Wager. Murray transferred to command the larger frigate HMS Pearl on 19 February of the next year after her captain, who Murray had previously succeeded in Wager, died while the squadron was sailing to the coast of Patagonia. (Note: Charnock has Murray joining Pearl on 31 January.)

The squadron continued southwards but after considerable difficulty in sailing, Pearl and the ship of the line HMS Severn were forced to leave the squadron after losing sight of it completely on 10 April, around the Le Maire Strait. The two ships entered Rio de Janeiro on 6 June after having battled through a large storm for forty days and having lost a large number of crew members to scurvy and fatigue. They then sailed to Barbados, arriving on 5 February 1742 from where they sailed to England without further mishap. Pearl was ordered to be broken up on 22 April 1743, leaving Murray without a command.

Murray was next appointed to command the ship of the line HMS Hampshire on 6 October, in which he was sent to serve in the Mediterranean. Murray and Hampshire served in a squadron stationed off Cape Ortegal and there he captured the Spanish privateer Nuestra Senora del Rosario on 22 December before transferring to Norris' fleet in the Channel in 1744. Some time after this Hampshire returned to the Mediterranean and in January 1745 Murray was one of the presiding captains in the court martial at Mahon of Captain Richard Norris, who had absconded from his post in 1744.

He left Hampshire in May and instead joined the ship of the line HMS Revenge as her temporary captain between 28 May 1745 and 17 November 1748; he did not serve at sea again until 7 May 1755 when he was given command of the newly captured ship of the line HMS Trydent. He then recommissioned the ship of the line HMS Duke on 23 September 1755, but this command came to an end on 15 June 1756 when Murray chose to retire from active service in the navy.

=== Flag rank ===
Murray became a superannuated rear-admiral on 16 July 1756, providing him with the rank of rear-admiral but without the ability to be further promoted or to hold commands at sea as an admiral. (Note: Charnock has his promotion to flag rank in May.) In 1778 his elder brother Patrick died, leaving him to inherit his title as Lord Elibank.

== Death ==
Murray died at Ballinerig, Scotland, on 11 November 1785.

== Family ==
Murray married Isabella, the daughter of George Mackenzie, 3rd Earl of Cromartie. They had two children:

- Maria Murray-Mackenzie who married Colonel Lord Edward Hay, brother of George Hay, 8th Marquess of Tweeddale
- Isabella Murray-Mackenzie

Not having a son, Murray's title passed to his nephew Alexander upon his death.

== Notes and citations ==
=== Citations ===
Peerage of Scotland
Preceded by Patrick Murray	Lord Elibank; 1778-1785	Succeeded by Alexander Murray
