= Matthew Michell =

English politician and naval officer

Captain Matthew Michell

Member of Parliament for Westbury
- In office 16 March 1748 – 29 April 1752

Personal details
- Born: c.1705
- Died: 29 April 1752
- Party: Whig
- Spouse: Frances Ashfordby
- Children: 2
- Relatives: Sir William Willys, 6th Baronet (uncle)

Military service
- Allegiance: Kingdom of Great Britain
- Branch/service: Royal Navy
- Years of service: 1713–1748
- Rank: Captain
- Commands: HMS Terrible; HMS Swift; HMS Pearl; HMS Gloucester; HMS Worcester; Downs Station
- Battles/wars: War of the Austrian Succession; War of Jenkins' Ear; George Anson's voyage around the world; Jacobite rising of 1745

Captain Matthew Michell (often misspelt Mitchell, c.1705 – 29 April 1752) was an English politician and Royal Navy officer. He served in the House of Commons as Member of Parliament for Westbury from 1748 until his death.

== Naval service ==
=== Early career ===
Matthew Michell was born in around 1705, the first son of Christopher Michell of Chitterne, Wiltshire and Anne Willys of London. Michell's maternal uncle was Sir William Willys, 6th Baronet. Michell joined the Royal Navy in 1713, aged eight, and was promoted to lieutenant on 11 April 1729, serving in the 50-gun fourth-rate HMS Advice. Michell saw subsequent service as a lieutenant in the 70-gun ships of the line HMS Royal Oak and HMS Ipswich before he was promoted to commander in August 1738. At the same time Michell received his first command, the 14-gun bomb vessel HMS Terrible, in which he served in the North Sea.

Michell moved commands in 1740 to join the 12-gun cutter HMS Swift, serving in the English Channel. In June the same year he was promoted to post-captain. At this point he was given command of the 40-gun frigate HMS Pearl.

=== With Anson ===
With the War of Jenkins' Ear ongoing, Pearl was appointed to join Commodore George Anson's squadron in a voyage around the world. The force sailed to the South Seas on 18 September, and while at Madeira on 3 November Michell was sent to replace Captain Richard Norris as the commanding officer of another of Anson's ships, the 50-gun fourth-rate HMS Gloucester. The squadron subsequently rounded Cape Horn in terrible conditions that saw Gloucester receive great damage and high casualties amongst her crew. With the crew sick with scurvy and lacking water supplies, Michell succeeded in getting his ship to the rendezvous with Anson at the Juan Fernández Islands in July 1741.

Michell's crew was so weak after their passage that despite having reached sight of Juan Fernández it took Gloucester a further four weeks to make harbour there. The ship was subsequently repaired and Anson sent more men on board to replace those lost. Gloucester re-joined Anson off Paita in November, sailing off the American coast before beginning the passage across the Pacific Ocean towards China. Gloucester continued to be in poor shape, scurvy having hit the crew again, with Michell reporting in March the following year that around 300 men had so far died on Gloucester, leaving only eighty of the original crew. During the passage across the Pacific Gloucester was heavily damaged in a storm; the ship lost her mainmast and with 7 feet (2.1 m) of water in the hold was close to sinking. The crew had been further weakened, with only sixteen men and eleven boys capable of getting on deck to work the ship.

Gloucester had a new mast jury rigged but sailed very poorly with it. Unable to stop the leaks in the hull, Anson ordered Gloucester to be abandoned and set on fire on 13 August. The surviving crew were taken on board Anson's ship, the 60-gun fourth-rate HMS Centurion. Centurion was also in very poor condition and Michell, despite being a supernumerary, worked with the officers on board to supplement the seamen in keeping the ship afloat until she reached Macao. At this stage Michell was allowed to leave the squadron and take passage home to England in a Swedish merchant ship. He arrived in June 1743, thus missing Anson's capture of the Manila galleon in the same month. Michell and the other officers who had returned to England were feted in public for their part in the expedition and favourably received by the Admiralty.

=== Downs Station ===
Without a command, Michell spent several months on half pay before in October he was given the 60-gun fourth-rate HMS Worcester. The ship formed part of Admiral Sir John Norris' fleet from January 1744. Still commanding Worcester in 1745, Michell was appointed commodore of the Downs Station. When France invaded the Netherlands in 1747 the ships under Michell's command served off the Flanders and Zeeland coasts, playing an important role in ending the Second Stadtholderless Period in the Dutch Republic. The Dutch politician Willem Bentinck van Rhoon wrote to John Montagu, 4th Earl of Sandwich in May saying that Michell's "diligence, activity, prudence, and spirit are quite remarkable, and will gain him universal admiration".

== Political career ==
Despite Michell's success with the Downs Station he was not happy. In poor health due to the scurvy he had caught on Anson's expedition, he described his command as "this Cursed Station". At the 1747 British general election Prime Minister Henry Pelham had Michell stand with Chauncy Townsend as the Whig candidate for Westbury, the constituency in which Chitterne sat. Anson had recommended Michell to Pelham. Michell was still at sea at this time and was represented locally during the election by his brother Robert. Pelham and Townsend jointly paid the fees Michell owed for the process. He lost the election and subsequently wrote to Anson that "By my brother's account I have had a great deal of injustice done me by the returning officer.

Michell had the result of the election overturned in a petition and was seated on 16 March 1748. He then resigned from the Royal Navy. In parliament Michell consistently supported Pelham's administration until he died, apparently in the prime of his life, on 29 April 1752.

== Personal life ==
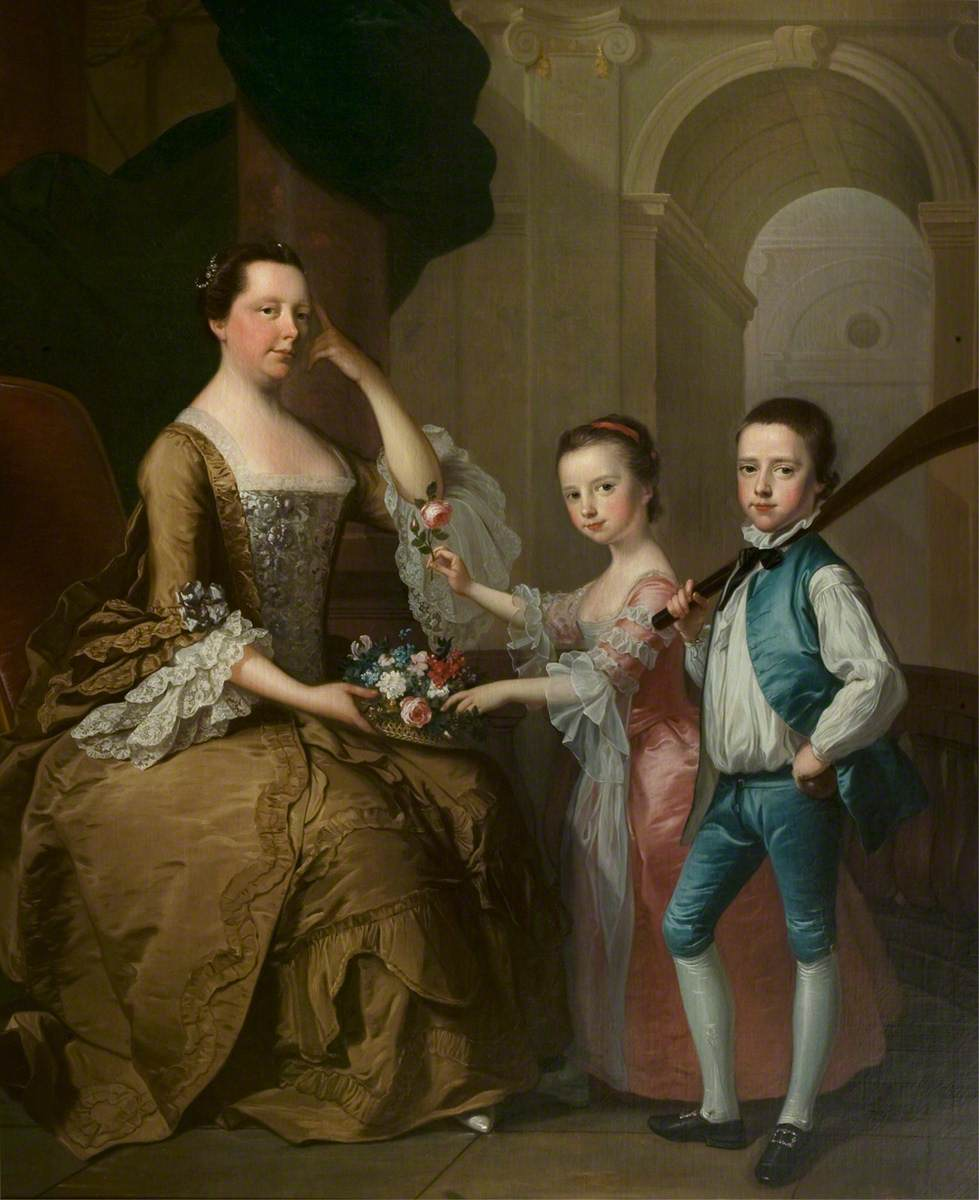
Mrs Matthew Michell and Her Children, Matthew and Anne, painting by Thomas Hudson, 1757-1758.

Michell married Frances Ashfordby, the daughter of John Ashfordby of Cheshunt, Hertfordshire, on 4 March 1749. Ashfordby brought with her a dowry of £20,000, equivalent to £3,010,000 in 2019. Together the couple had a son and a daughter. Their daughter, Anne, married the naval officer Captain Richard Onslow in 1773.

== Citations ==
Parliament of Great Britain
Preceded by John Bance; Paul Methuen	Member of Parliament for Westbury; 1748–1752; With: Chauncy Townsend	Succeeded by Chauncy Townsend; Peregrine Bertie
