= Governor Lee =

Governor Lee may refer to:

- Andrew E. Lee (1847–1934), 3rd Governor of South Dakota
- Blair Lee III (1916–1985), acting Governor of Maryland
- Bill Lee (Tennessee politician) (born 1959), 50th Governor of Tennessee
- Fitzhugh Lee (1835–1905), 40th Governor of Virginia
- FitzRoy Henry Lee (1699–1750), Commodore Governor of the Colony of Newfoundland from 1735 to 1737
- H. Rex Lee (1910–2001), Governor of American Samoa from 1961 to 1967 and from 1977 to 1978
- Henry Lee III (1756–1818), 9th Governor of Virginia
- J. Bracken Lee (1899–1996), 9th Governor of Utah
- Thomas Lee (Virginia colonist) (1690–1750), de facto Governor of Virginia from 1749 to 1750
- Thomas Sim Lee (1745–1819), Governor of Maryland from 1779 to 1783 and from 1792 to 1794
