= Edward Legge =

Edward Legge may refer to:

- Edward Legge (Royal Navy officer) (1710–1747), Royal Navy officer and posthumous MP for Portsmouth
- Edward Legge (bishop) (1767–1827), Bishop of Oxford, clergyman
