= Castaway (disambiguation) =

A castaway is a person cast adrift or ashore.

Castaway or Cast Away may also refer to:

== Businesses ==
- Castaways (casino), a former Las Vegas, Nevada hotel
- Castaway Cay, a private island operated by the Walt Disney Company
- Castaway Entertainment, a software company
- Castaway Island, a tourist resort in the Mamanuca Island group in Fiji
- Castaways Hotel and Casino, a former Las Vegas hotel and casino

== Film and TV ==
- The Castaways (film), a 1910 American silent film
- Cast Away, a 2000 film starring Tom Hanks
- Castaway (film), a 1986 film starring Amanda Donohoe and Oliver Reed, adapted from the Lucy Irvine memoir
- Castaway 2000, a BBC series
- Castaway 2007, a BBC series
- Castaways, a 1978 historical drama series featuring Annie Whittle
- Castaway (TV series), a 2011 Australian television series
- Castaways (TV series), an American reality television series produced by ABC
- The Castaway (film), a 1931 Mickey Mouse animated short
- The Castaways (Australian TV series), a 1974 Australian television series
- The Castaways (British TV series), a 2023 British television series
- "Castaways" (Dawson's Creek), a 2003 television episode

== Literature ==
- "The Castaways" (short story), P.G. Wodehouse
- Castaway (book), a 1984 memoir by Lucy Irvine
- The Castaway, Hallie Erminie Rives's 1904 novel that was the subject of Bobbs-Merrill Co. v. Straus, a landmark US copyright case
- "The Castaway" (poem), a 1799 poem/ballad by William Cowper

== Music ==
- The Castaways (band), an American garage rock band
- Cast Away (album), a 2004 album by Visions of Atlantis
- Cast Away, a 2013 album by Strange Talk
- "Castaway" (Zac Brown Band song), from Jekyll + Hyde
- "Castaway" (Mi-Sex song), a 1982 song by Mi-Sex
- "Castaway", a song by 5 Seconds of Summer from Sounds Good Feels Good
- "Castaway", a song by Andromeda from Two Is One
- "Castaway", a song by Benny Benassi from ...Phobia
- "Castaway", a song by Dog Fashion Disco from Committed to a Bright Future
- "Castaway", a song by Green Day from Warning
- "Castaway", a song by Jerry Cantrell from Degradation Trip
- "Castaway", a song by Mike Oldfield from Man on the Rocks
- "Castaway", a song by Of Mice & Men from Tether
- "Castaway", a song by Paul Van Dyk from In Between
- "Castaway", a song by Starkill from Gravity
- "Castaway", a song by Yuna from Rouge
- "Castaway", a song from In Search of the Castaways
- "Castaways" (song), a song from the children's show The Backyardigans which became a popular meme song
- "The Castaway", a song by Amorphis from Tales from the Thousand Lakes
- "The Castaway", a song by The Autumn Offering from Fear Will Cast No Shadow
- Castaway, an opera by Lennox Berkeley

== Other uses ==
- Castaways' Club, a club for Royal Navy officers who left the service whilst still young

== See also ==
- In Search of the Castaways, by Jules Verne (1868)
- In Search of the Castaways (film), a 1962 Walt Disney Productions feature film
- Johnny Castaway, a screensaver from 1992
