= George Anson's voyage around the world =

British Royal Navy mission, 1740–1744

Path of the Centurion under the command of George Anson

While Great Britain was fighting the War of Jenkins' Ear with Spain in 1740, Commodore George Anson led a squadron of eight ships on a mission to disrupt or capture the Spanish possessions in the Pacific. He returned to Britain in 1744 by way of China, thereby completing a circumnavigation of the globe. The voyage was notable for the capture of the Manila galleon and for its horrific losses due to powerful storms and disease, with only 188 men of the original 1,854 crew and officers surviving. An account of the voyage was published in 1748. It was widely read by the general public and was a great commercial success. It has been described in 1899 as being "still esteemed as the story of a remarkable voyage extremely well told."

== Background ==
In 1739, the riches that Spain derived from the New World were well known throughout Europe. Huge quantities of silver were shipped from Peru, carried over the isthmus at Panama and then loaded on ships at Portobelo bound for Spain. Other ships carried luxury goods from Manila to Acapulco from where they were taken to Vera Cruz and loaded along with Mexican silver. Spain's Caribbean possessions provided sugar, tobacco, dyes and spices.

Britain had negotiated a treaty (the asiento) that allowed the South Sea Company to send one slave trading vessel per year to Spanish territory but private British merchants, many operating out of Jamaica, smuggled cargo (to avoid being taxed) which the Spanish attempted to intercept. After numerous incidents and with old rivalries flaring up once again, increased tensions led to the War of Jenkins' Ear.

Various schemes were proposed to attack Spanish possessions. Edward Vernon captured Portobelo in November 1739 with just six ships, and a second squadron to be led by George Anson, was to sail around Cape Horn with six warships carrying 500 troops with instructions to capture Callao in Peru (the port that served the nearby capital Lima) and if possible take Lima as well; capture Panama with its treasure; seize the galleon from Acapulco; and lead a Peruvian revolt against the Spanish colonial authorities. An earlier proposal to also capture Manila was dropped.

It appears that a conflict of interest was, at least in part, behind the unreasonable orders given to Anson by the Duke of Newcastle on 28 June 1740. The attacks were suggested by Hubert Tassell and Henry Hutchison, previously factors (agents) of the South Sea Company who had significant recent information about the area which the government lacked but who also stood to gain if the area was opened up to British trade. Supporting this view was that the squadron was to carry £15,000 of trade goods. Given the length of the voyage, it was expected that it would be necessary to buy provisions along the way. In friendly ports, bills of exchange would have been used. In enemy ports it may not have been possible to buy anything, though outright seizure would be possible if the town was captured. The relationship of Tassell and Hutchison to the squadron was further complicated by them supplying victuals (food) and that they would come along on one of the ships to oversee the trade goods.

== The ships and men ==
The squadron based in Portsmouth was composed of six warships:

- Centurion (a fourth-rate ship of 1,005 tons, 60 guns, 400 men and the flagship)
- Gloucester (853 tons, 50 guns, 300 men)
- Severn (853 tons, 50 guns, 300 men)
- Pearl (600 tons, 40 guns, 250 men)
- Wager (599 tons, 24 guns, 160 men)
- Tryal (200 tons, 8 guns, 70 men)

Two merchant vessels, Anna and Industry, would carry additional supplies.

The provision of 500 troops was farcical. No regular troops were made available so 500 invalids were to be collected from the Chelsea Hospital. In this case, the term invalid referred to soldiers that were too sick, wounded or old for active duty but might be able to perform lighter duties. In any case, on hearing details of the proposed voyage, those that could get away did and only 259 came aboard, many on stretchers. To make up for the 241 missing, marines were ordered aboard, but these were such fresh recruits that few of them had yet been trained how to fire a gun.

The addition of invalids and marines caused all the ships to be overcrowded. For example the Wager sailed with 250, of whom only 105 were crew..

== The departure ==
The squadron was as ready as it was going to get by mid-August but strong winds kept the ships in harbour. Before heading to South America, Anson was required to escort a huge fleet of transports and merchant vessels out of the English Channel and the initial attempt to get to sea was abandoned as ships crashed into each other. Finally the squadron sailed from Spithead on 18 September 1740 overseeing a convoy of 152 ships. Unfortunately, with the long delays, French agents had picked up word of the expedition and passed the information to Spain. In response, they sent five warships under Admiral Pizarro to lie in wait near Portuguese Madeira which was neutral territory and to be Anson's first port of call.

== Voyage ==
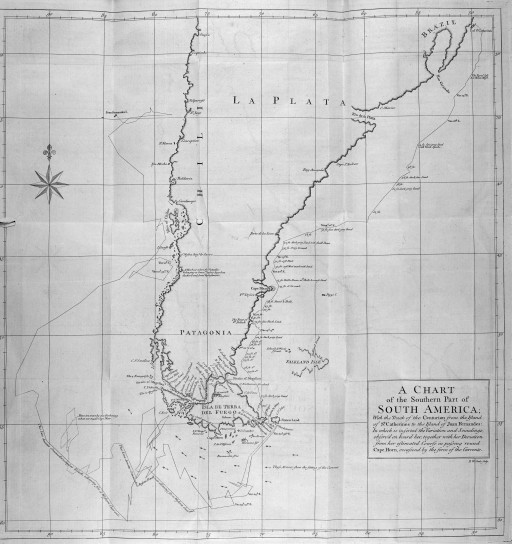
Map of Cape Horn

The squadron reached Madeira on 25 October 1740, the journey taking four weeks longer than normal. Portuguese officials reported that warships, probably Spanish, had been seen at the western end of the island so Anson sent a boat out to investigate but it returned without sighting them. Fresh food and water were taken on with extra urgency and the ships slipped out without incident on 3 November. (Note: Williams gives the date as 5 November, while the abridged version of the official account gives the date as 3 November.) Had contact been made with Pizarro's squadron, the expedition likely would have ended since Anson's ships would have had to throw overboard the huge quantity of provisions cluttering the decks, which prevented the effective working of the guns.

After taking three days at sea to transfer supplies, Industry turned back on 20 November. By now, food had started to rot and the ships were infested with flies. There was a desperate need to provide additional ventilation to the lower decks. Normally the gun ports would be opened but since the ships were riding so low in the water with the weight of provisions, this was impossible, so six air holes were cut in each ship. However, this was only part of a bigger problem that was to have disastrous consequences. With the ships' regular crew, the conditions were crowded, with hammocks placed 14" (about 36cm) apart, though the rotating watch system meant that only half would be below at any one time so effectively each had 28" (about 71cm). However, the invalids and marines boosted the number of men on board by about 25% and were forced to stay below most of the time as they would be in the way on deck. Typhus, or ship fever, is spread by body lice which thrived in the hot, humid and unsanitary conditions. After two months at sea, this disease and dysentery raced through the crews.

The squadron reached Ilha de Santa Catarina (St Catherine's), a large island just off the coast of Portuguese southern Brazil on 21 December and the sick were sent ashore, eighty from Centurion alone. A thorough cleaning then commenced with the below-deck areas first scrubbed clean, then fires lit inside and the hatches closed so that the smoke would kill rats and other vermin, then everything was washed down with vinegar.

Anson had hoped to stay only long enough to pick up firewood, fresh water and provisions but the main mast of Tryal needed repairs that took almost a month. Meanwhile, the men on shore in makeshift tents were exposed to mosquitoes and malaria. Although 28 men from the Centurion had died while in port, the number of sick taken back on board when they left on 18 January 1741 had increased from 80 to 96. A wide variety of fruits and vegetables were available but it is unclear how much actually came on board. The official account noted a "great plenty" but one journal keeper said it was enough only to feed all the crew for a single day. Although Portugal was not at war with England and in theory was an ally under the Anglo-Portuguese Alliance, the governor was later revealed to have notified Spanish Buenos Aires where Pizarro's squadron had arrived. Although waiting for provisions, Pizarro immediately put to sea sailing south to get around Cape Horn before the British.

Anson sailed 18 January 1741 intending to stop at Puerto San Julián (near the eastern entrance to the Strait of Magellan) where there was no European presence but supposedly bountiful supplies of salt. Four days later, in a storm, the repaired mast of Tryal broke, forcing the Gloucester to take it in tow. During the same storm, the Pearl was separated from the squadron and her captain died, with First Lieutenant Sampson Salt taking command. Sampson then sighted five ships with the lead ship bearing English colours, but was dismayed to find at the last moment it was the Spanish ships. The crew frantically threw overboard everything not immediately needed and hoisted extra sail. The Spanish ships held back from chasing, believing Pearl was headed for a shoal, but it was spawning fish, not rocks, in the water, and the Pearl was able to escape as darkness fell.

Even though the Spanish ships were known to be somewhere in the area, the squadron had no choice but to stop at St Julian, which was found to have no trees or fresh water and barely any salt. Tryal's broken topmast was simply removed and a spare topmast used to replace the broken foremast, effectively reducing her rigging but probably the key to allowing her to weather the ferocious storms to come. The ships reached Strait of Le Maire, the entrance to the path around Cape Horn, on 7 March 1741 in unseasonably fine weather but shortly afterwards it turned to a violent gale from the south. Having avoided being blown onto Staten Island, Anson ordered Tryal to lead, on the lookout for ice. However, carrying sufficient sail to keep ahead of the other ships left the ship dangerously unstable, with the men on deck frequently exposed to the freezing water. Since the deck cannon were getting continually doused, it would have been impossible to fire warning shots even if they had seen ice so Tryal was removed from this duty, and the Pearl took its place, leaving her Captain, Saumarez, to write that 'really life is not worth pursuing at the expense of such hardships'. While the crew, weakened by typhus and dysentery, fought gale-force winds and huge seas, scurvy broke out. What little useful information available on its prevention was ignored and it is unlikely that the navy could have procured sufficient vitamin C for 1,000 men even if it had recognized the need. Hundreds of men died of disease in the weeks during and immediately after battling around the Horn. In one incredible case, a man who had been wounded at the Battle of the Boyne in 1690 but had made a complete recovery, now found, 50 years later, that his wounds reopened and a broken bone fractured again.

At the beginning of April, the ships headed north believing that they were 300 miles (480 km) west of land. However, through lack of alternatives at that time, ships had to estimate their east–west position by dead reckoning — calculating the distance covered knowing the ship's speed and heading — which could not account for unknown ocean currents, and so on the night of 13-14th, the crew of the Anna were alarmed to see the cliffs of Cape Noir just 2 miles (3.2 km) away. They fired cannon and lit lamps to warn the others and they were just able to claw their way out to sea although there was great concern that the Severn and Pearl were already lost as they had not been sighted since the 10th.

Another storm hit just as the Wager fell from sight and on 24 April, both Centurion and Gloucester reported that every sail was torn or loose, but the crew was too few and too weak to attempt repairs until the next day, by which time the ships were scattered. The sailing instructions included three rendezvous points if the ships were scattered, and Centurion reached the first, Socorro (Guamblin Island, 45°S on Chilean coast) on 8 May. After waiting two weeks and seeing no other ships, Anson decided to sail for Juan Fernandez, the third rendezvous point, since the second, Valdivia, was on the coast and would be too dangerous to find being on a lee shore.

However, the charts carried by the squadron placed Juan Fernandez at 33°30'S and 135 miles (217 km) west of Valparaíso on the South American coast. In fact, it is located at 34°47'S and 360 miles (580 km) west. Anson, now unsure of his charts and his navigator's skills, headed east and soon saw the coast of Chile. Turning back west, it took nine days to reach the area he had left, during which time 70–80 men died. Juan Fernandez was then sighted at daybreak on 9 June. However, by now there were only eight men and the remaining officers and their servants able to work the ship. After anchoring for the night they were too weak to lift the anchor the following morning but were lucky to be blown free by a sudden squall. As they manoeuvered into the bay they were appalled to find no other ships waiting there but then sighted the tiny Tryal approaching. Of the 86 crew and marines, 46 had died and now only the captain, Charles Saunders, his lieutenant and three seamen were able to stand on deck. Those still able worked desperately to get the sick ashore.

Engravings from A voyage round the world, in the years MDCCXL, I, II, III, IV, by George Anson, Esq:

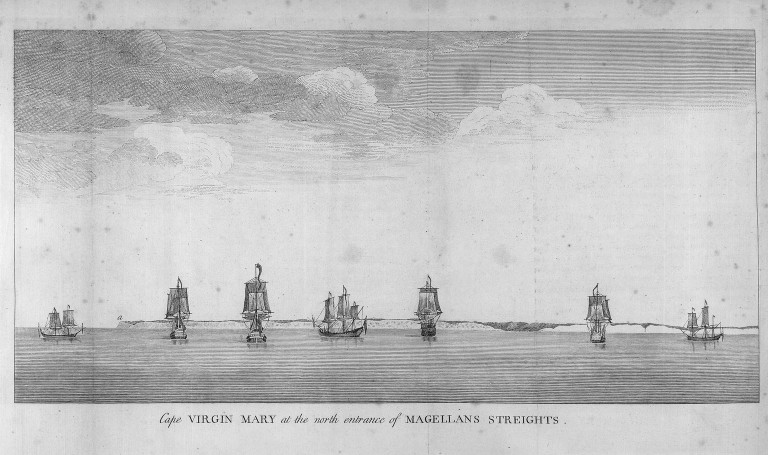
Anson's ships in the Strait of Magellan

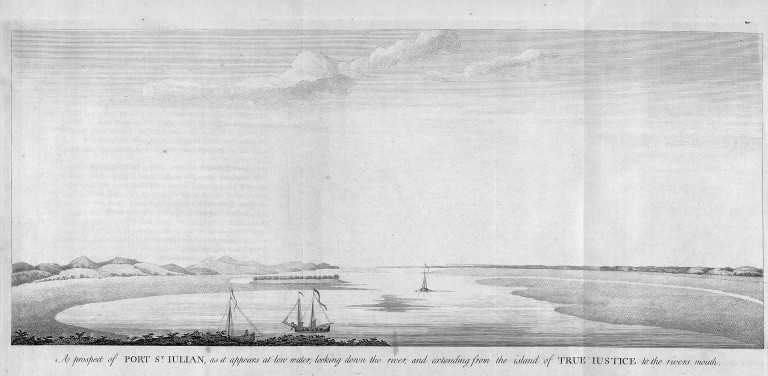
At Puerto San Julián

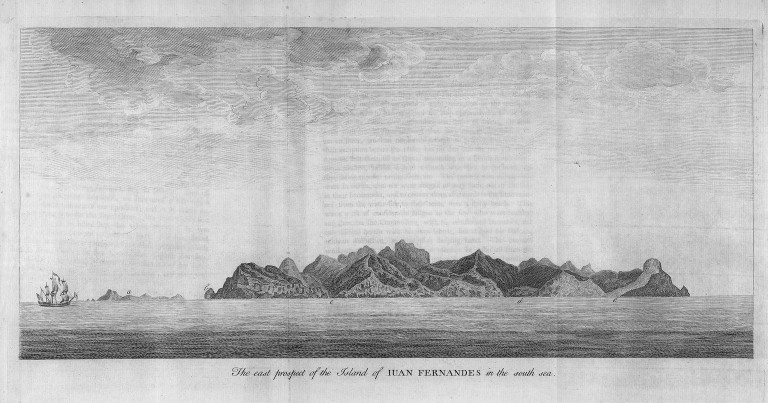
At Juan Fernández Islands

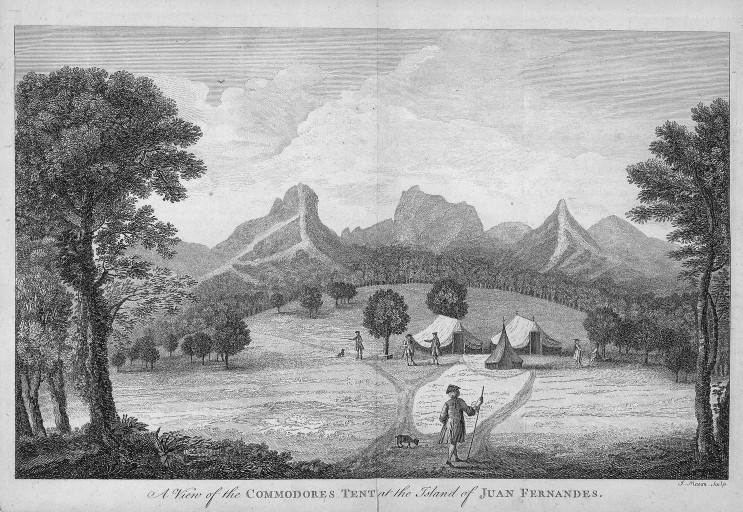
Anson's tent at Robinson Crusoe Island

Given the mortality rate on Centurion and Tryal, it seemed likely that the crews of the other ships would all be dead if they were unable to reach Juan Fernandez in the next few days. On 21 June a ship was sighted with only one sail, apparently in trouble, but it was another six days before the ship was close enough to be identified as Gloucester. A long boat was sent out to meet the ship, but they were unable to get the ship into the anchorage at Cumberland Bay. The ship was then blown out to sea and it was not until 23 July that Gloucester was finally able to make anchorage. Since leaving Port St Julian, 254 had died leaving 92 men, most debilitated by scurvy. Fresh greens and fish allowed some to recover quickly but others were too weak and died ashore.

Remarkably, the Anna was sighted on 16 August and without apparent difficulty worked its way into Cumberland Bay. After losing sight of the other ships on 24 April, she had attempted to make the rendezvous at Socorro and had been blown ashore. Just as all hope seemed lost, they saw the entry to a harbour (now called Bahía Anna Pink, Chile at 45.83S 74.83W) and were able to take refuge. For two months they stayed to perform makeshift repairs to the ship and allow the crew to recover their health before departing for Juan Fernandez. The harbour had a good fresh water supply, wild greens and game. Given the abundant provisions and minimal crew on the merchant ship, the crew was in much better health, even than those on the warships at the time she was blown ashore. However, a survey after arrival at Juan Fernandez reported that she was so badly damaged that she was beyond repair, so Anson had the ship broken up and the crew transferred to Gloucester. Anson prepared to sail in September 1741 but before leaving took a census which found that of the original 961 that had left Britain on Centurion, Gloucester and Tryal, 626, or roughly two-thirds, had died. The fate of those on the other three ships was at that time unknown.

=== The missing ships ===
Severn and Pearl lost sight of the other ships during the night of 10 April 1741, although it is not clear if they also lost sight of each other until morning. There were accusations later that Captain Edward Legge on the Severn had made some arrangement with Captain George Murray on Pearl to break away from the group. Before the storm both captains reported severe problems with sickness with men dying every day and damage to ship, but Anson brushed them off, responding that their situation was no different from the others.

The two ships headed north together, attempting to rejoin the squadron, but on the 13th they also sighted land which they believed to be hundreds of miles behind them. Luckily, they made landfall in daylight so they had better warning. As fog descended and not knowing what had become of the other ships, Severn and Pearl headed west to get some sea room, and the officers agreed that, unless the winds became favourable, they would return around the Horn to safety. Then on the 17th violent gales from the north-west pushed them back toward the land. Lookouts believed they saw land, so to save the ships and the crew, the order was given to turn the ships south and east and retreat around Cape Horn. In fact, mortality on the Pearl was not nearly as severe as that on Severn; by the time that ship reached Rio de Janeiro on 6 June 158 of the ship's crew had died and of the remainder, 114 were too sick to be of use, leaving just 30 men and boys to work the ship. This does not count the invalids and marines, nearly all of whom died.

After a month in Rio, Murray wanted to make another attempt to reach the Pacific but Legge, the more senior officer overruled him, saying that both ships still had insufficient able-bodied men and in any case, even if Anson had survived the storms, he may well be headed home by now. The two ships left Rio in December 1741, headed for England via the West Indies. Although in London there were some gossip of desertion, the official report of the voyage in 1748 made no such suggestion but instead spoke of the 'great joy' aboard the Centurion after it reached Canton and learned that the two ships had survived.

=== Wager Mutiny ===
The Wager was more a freighter than a fighting ship and so even though only Tryal was smaller, she carried the largest number of invalids and marines (142, outnumbering the crew of 106) plus substantial stores for the other ships and guns and ammunition for the soldiers to fight with on shore. David Cheap was her third captain since leaving England, but had been sick during much of the voyage and was below decks, sick in his cabin, when the damaged ship lost sight of the others after the narrow escape off Cape Noir. After feeling they had made sufficient distance out to sea, he gave orders to head for the first rendezvous point, the island of Socorro just off the coast. His lieutenant Robert Baynes and the gunner John Bulkeley had argued that it was too dangerous to approach a target on the lee shore in a disabled ship with just 12 men fit for duty and so they should instead head toward Juan Fernandez in the open ocean. They were overruled.

On 13 May 1741, the carpenter John Cummins thought he had glimpsed land to the west. This seemed unlikely as the mainland was to the east of them but they had no proper chart and so the report was ignored. As they were soon to realize, they had sailed into a large bay with a peninsula blocking their progress to the north. After a struggle to turn the ship around with so few men, they were struck by a large wave, causing Cheap to fall down a ladder, dislocating his shoulder. The surgeon gave opium to Cheap for the pain and he slept below. Instead of taking command, Baynes took to the bottle and also disappeared below. Lashed by the storm, the ship crashed onto rocks at 4 am. For the next few hours she lurched from one rock to another and then just before sinking became completely stuck. At this point there was a complete breakdown of discipline as the crew helped themselves to liquor and arms. The ship's boats were still serviceable and 140 men made it to the exposed beach of what would become known as Wager Island including Cheap, who was carried ashore. He tried to maintain control, but most blamed him for the loss of the ship and their current awful situation by his insistence on making Socorro. Admiralty regulations meant that wages would not be accrued after a wreck, so most now held Cheap in contempt rather than authority. He now carried pistols at all times. His hasty decision to shoot a drunken crew member on 10 June, followed by his refusal to allow the doctor to treat him meant that the victim took two weeks to die, alienating most of Cheap's remaining supporters. After his death, about 100 remained alive on the beach with limited food salvaged from the wreck and little shelter against the ferocious winds and driving rain of winter. Their only likely hope for salvation was the 38-foot (12 m) longboat, 30-foot (9.1 m) cutter and two smaller boats. The carpenter lengthened the longboat to 50-foot (15 m) and added a deck so that most, though not all, would fit on board.

While the work was underway, arguments developed about where to go and a slow-motion mutiny was underway. Cheap still insisted on sailing north to uninhabited Socorro in the hope of finding Anson waiting there. Valdivia was 600 miles (970 km) north, but as a Spanish town, they would not find relief there. Bulkeley read Narborough's account of the passage through the admittedly treacherous Strait of Magellan 400 miles (640 km) to the south and concluded it was their only viable option, as they could then sail north to Brazil. He got 45 others to sign a paper agreeing to the plan. Cheap, now acting through his purser Thomas Harvey, attempted to win support to head north with the uncommitted with bribes of liquor that he still had under his control. Bulkeley offered limited command to Cheap if he agreed to sail south and Cheap appeared to at least not reject it. By the time the modified longboat was ready on 9 October 1741, Cheap still had not made a final commitment so Bulkeley had him arrested on the charge of murder and had him bound.

Four days later, the newly christened Speedwell, now configured as a schooner, sailed south with 59 men aboard under the nominal command of Lieutenant Baynes, followed by the cutter with 12 men, a 'barge' (Note: A barge in this context was "the second boat of a man-of-war"; a long narrow boat, generally with not fewer than ten oars, for the use of the chief officers". See ship's boat. One type of Captain's gig was known as the admiral's barge.) with 10 and another small boat with Cheap, Lieutenant Hamilton and the surgeon. It appears that Bulkeley and the others intended that Cheap would be left to his fate in the smallest, and presumably slowest, boat. About a dozen men had fled the camp (to avoid the severe punishment Cheap so often ordered) and were left behind on the island. However, after making only a few miles progress in two days, a sail on the cutter tore and so the men on the barge were sent to get canvas from the camp. On returning they chose to follow Captain Cheap. The larger boats once again headed south only to lose the cutter a few days later in a gale. There was not room on the Speedwell and 10 men, supposedly volunteers, were put ashore. Without any small boat, the only way to get ashore to search for food was to swim through the icy water and soon those that were too weak or who could not swim started dying. With disputes over navigation, wild currents, rain and fog, it took a month to reach the Atlantic and they were still far from relief.

The Speedwell came in close to shore on 14 January 1742 at 38°40'S at Freshwater Bay, in what is today the resort city of Mar del Plata. Those that swam ashore found fresh water and seals. Eight of them were dismayed to see the boat leaving without them, and they would later accuse Bulkeley of abandoning them to save supplies, while he claimed they were blown out to sea. Bulkeley, Baynes and 31 others sailed north, reaching the Portuguese waters of the Rio Grande on 28 January. Three men died during the journey and the rest were now close to it. Eventually some of the men made their way back to England by whatever route they could.

The eight men stayed for a month eating seal meat until they decided to make for Buenos Aires, 300 miles (480 km) further north. They twice ran out of food and water and were forced to return. One day Isaac Morris and three others returned to find two of the others stabbed to death and the remaining two missing. The guns, flints and the few other supplies they had were gone and their fire extinguished. After a failed third attempt on Buenos Aires, they were captured by a group of nomad Tehuelches who took them on as slaves and they were traded from one Indian group to another. In late 1743, an English merchant living in Buenos Aires paid for the release of three of them; the fourth of mixed race was kept by the Indians. However, the Spanish put them in jail and in early 1745 were put on board Pizarro's former flagship, Asia, as prisoners of war.

Meanwhile, Captain Cheap back at Wager Island had a party of 19 men after the deserters rejoined the camp. This included the surgeon Elliot and Lieutenant Hamilton who had been cast adrift with him plus midshipmen Byron and Campbell who had been on the barge. They rowed up the coast but were punished by continuous rain, headwinds and waves that threatened the boats. Sometimes they were able to get ashore but often they had to sleep in the boats. One night while on shore, one of the boats was capsized while at anchor and was swept out to sea with its two boatkeepers. One of the men was able to get ashore but the other drowned. Since it was now impossible for them all to fit in the remaining boat, four marines were left ashore with muskets to fend for themselves. However, the winds prevented them from getting around the headland so they returned to pick up the marines only to find them gone so they returned to Wager Island in early February 1742. With one death on the journey, there were now 13 in the group.

A local Chono Indian agreed to guide the men up the coast to Chiloé Island on promise of keeping the boat on arrival so they set out again. Two men died and after burying the bodies, the six seaman rowed off in the boat never to be seen again while Cheap, Hamilton, Byron, Campbell and the dying Elliot were on shore looking for food. The Indian then agreed to take the remaining four on by canoe for their only remaining possession, a musket. Eventually they made it to be taken prisoner by the Spanish. Fortunately the Spaniards treated them well and they were eventually taken to the inland capital of Santiago where they were released on parole. They heard that Anson had been generous in the treatment of the prisoners he had taken, and so this kindness was returned.

The four men stayed in Santiago till late 1744 and were offered passage on a French ship bound for Spain. Campbell elected not to take the offer but took a mule across the Andes and joined Admiral Pizarro in Montevideo on Asia, only to find Isaac Morris and the two seamen that had been abandoned in Freshwater Bay. After some further time in prison in Spain, Campbell reached Britain in May 1746, followed by the other three two months later. Now that the major players were all back in England, accusations flew but the official court martial only examined the loss of Wager in which Baynes, in nominal charge at the time, was acquitted of blame but reprimanded for omissions of duty. Disputes over what happened after the wreck were instead played out as Bulkeley and Cummins, Campbell, Morris, the cooper Young and later Byron published their own accounts, the last of which was the only one that in any way defended Cheap who had since died.

Twenty nine crew members plus seven marines made it back to England.

=== Attacks in Spanish America ===
By September 1741, back at Juan Fernandez, most of Anson's men were on the way to recovery and as their health returned, they were set to work carrying out much needed repairs on the ships – as best they could with limited materials and without port facilities. The big question for Anson though was what to do next. Given that his force had been so drastically reduced and that in the nine months since they had been at St. Catherine's and received any news, the strategic situation may have changed so that perhaps England and Spain were no longer at war. There was also no way of knowing what had become of Pizarro's squadron that had attempted to intercept them though he assumed that although they likely had troubles getting around the Horn, they had probably been repaired and resupplied and were now on the lookout for him.

While contemplating an attack on Panama, a single ship was sighted on 8 September, but it sailed past the island. Presuming it to be Spanish, Anson had Centurion readied for sea and set after it, but it disappeared into the night. They continued searching two more days, but as they were about to give up, another ship was spotted coming directly towards them, causing some alarm as they feared it might have been one of Pizarro's squadron. It turned out to be a lightly armed merchant vessel. After Centurion fired four shots into the rigging, she surrendered. The cargo of Nuestra Señora del Monte Carmelo (henceforth, Carmelo) was of little interest to Anson, but the passengers carried £18,000 of bullion. Of far greater value was the information obtained from documents found aboard. Spain was still at war with Britain and a British attack in the Caribbean had been repelled so there was now no hope of linking with friendly forces for a combined attack on Panama, nor could they be resupplied. However, there was no immediate danger from Pizarro as his squadron had suffered even more terribly in their attempt to get around Cape Horn ahead of Anson. Expecting a relatively quick voyage and with access to Spanish-held ports in Chile, Pizarro's ships had set out with only four months provisions but were hit by ferocious storms after rounding the Horn and were gradually pushed backwards. The paths of the British and Spanish ships must have crossed, but since both sides were concentrating on survival and in minimal visibility, neither sighted the other.

At some point, Hermiona (54 guns) sank without trace while on the other ships, the crews began to starve. Pizarro's flagship, Asia (66 guns) and San Estevan (40 guns) made it back to the River Plate with only half the crew still alive. On the Esperenza (50 guns), just 58 out of 450 reached safety. The hull of the Guipuscoa (74 guns) began to leak, and eventually she lost all three masts, by which time 250 of the 700 crew had died. Fortunately the wind blew the broken ship north past the Rio Plata rather than into the Atlantic. The largely helpless vessel ran aground near St. Catherine's.

On arrival in Buenos Aires, Pizarro sent a message overland to Peru warning of Anson's likely arrival in the Pacific and in response, four armed vessels were sent from Callao supposedly with orders to kill rather than capture. Three were stationed off Concepción while the fourth was sent to Juan Fernandez. They gave up waiting in early June, concluding that Anson's ships had either been lost at sea or had gone elsewhere. As it happened, the chart that incorrectly placed Juan Fernandez saved Anson's squadron: the nine days Anson wasted trying to find the island delayed his arrival until after the Spanish ship had left. Furthermore, the ships from Callao had also been badly damaged by storms and would be in port for another two months so there were now no Spanish ship looking for them, though suspicions would be raised again when Carmelo failed to arrive within a reasonable period. In the meantime, Anson's ships could capture unsuspecting merchant vessels sailing along the coast. Gloucester was sent north to hunt outside Paita but to stay sufficiently far out to sea that she could not be seen from land. Twenty nine Spanish prisoners were sent aboard to help man her, although only seven were of any use but all had to be guarded.

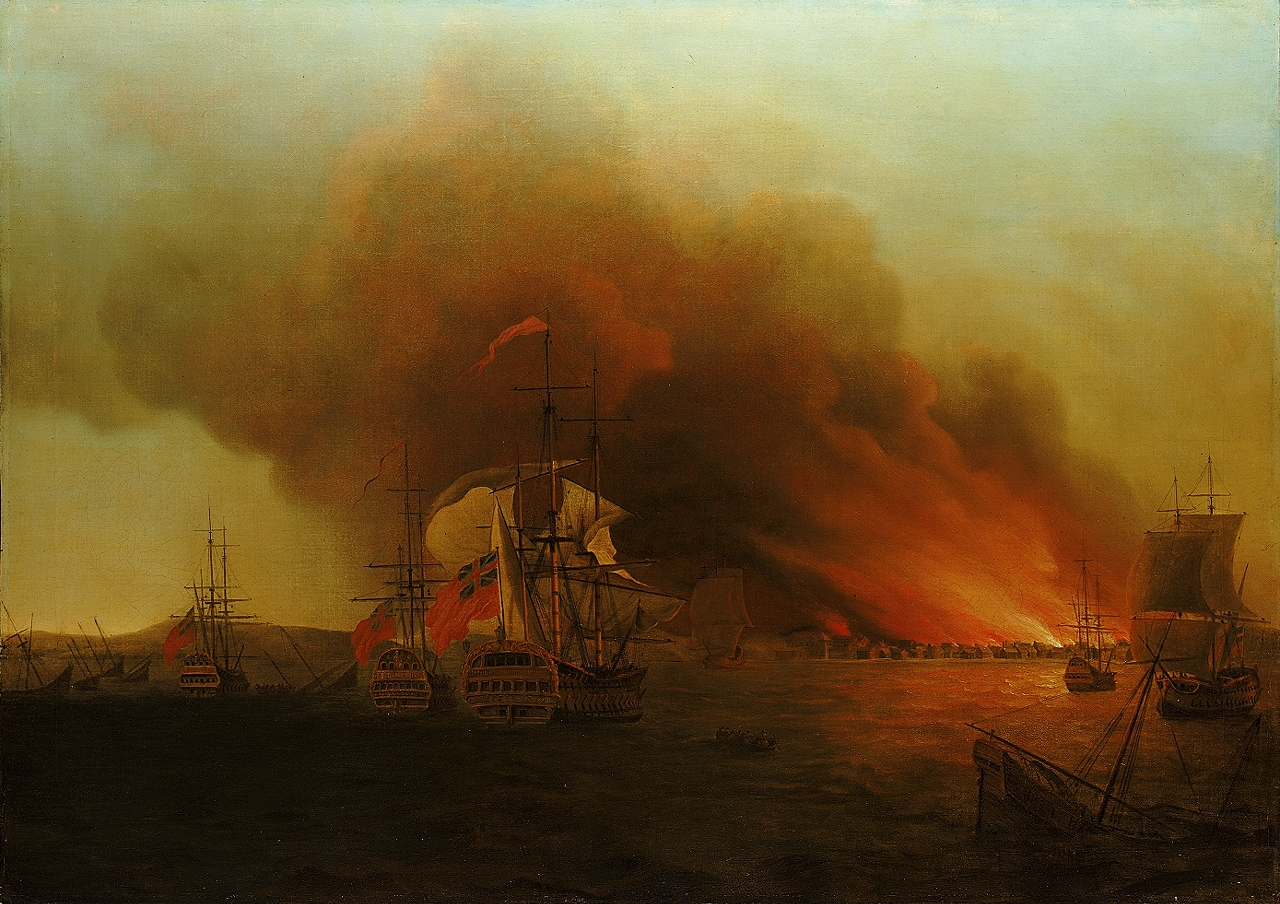
Anson's burning of the settlement Paita in Peru in 1742 – painting by Samuel Scott

Centurion, Carmelo and Tryal waited off Valparaiso. Tryal took the Arranzazu, an unarmed merchant ship three times her size carrying cargo of little use except for £5,000 in silver. However Tryal had been badly damaged by storms, so her guns were transferred to the prize vessel and she was allowed to sink. Centurion captured the Santa Teresa de Jesus whose cargo was near worthless but the passengers included three women. Anson intended to demonstrate that he was a disciplined military officer rather than a ruthless buccaneer, and so treated his prisoners well, including assigning a guard for the women and allowing them to keep their cabins. The Nuestra Señora de Carmin was then seized and an Irish sailor on board revealed that Gloucester had been sighted by a ship entering Paita, and that the authorities had been alerted.

With their cover blown, Anson decided to attack Paita immediately in the hope of intercepting treasure that was to be shipped to Mexico the next day. Given its small size, the town was lightly defended. But with limited forces, Anson had no hope of conquering any of the major Spanish settlements. Sixty men went ashore at night in the ships' boats and took the town with hardly a shot being fired by the Spaniards. One sailor was killed but it was believed to be 'friendly fire'. Most of the residents simply fled to a hill overlooking the town. Anson's men remained in the town for three days ferrying the contents of the customs house out to the ships, along with livestock to feed the crew. On the way out, Anson ordered that the prisoners be sent ashore and that town be burned, with the notable exception of two churches. One Spanish vessel in harbour was towed away and the rest were sunk. The tally of prize money came to £30,000 which, according to the rules, was to be distributed by rank regardless of who had actually gone ashore. This was one of many disputes over allocation of prize money. Meanwhile, Gloucester had captured two small vessels netting another £19,000.

The squadron of Centurion and Gloucester plus six prize ships then set off toward Acapulco in the hope of intercepting the galleon from Manila. It would be two months before it would arrive which would normally be ample time, but both Centurion and Gloucester were towing prize ships and the winds were against them. With water running short, they stopped at the island of Quibo (Isla de Coiba) where they also captured giant turtles for food, some of which were kept alive until needed. With good nutrition since leaving Juan Fernandez seven months earlier, only two of the crew had died.

Upon reaching what was thought to be the latitude of Acapulco on 26 January 1742 they turned east and seeing a light in the distance through the darkness, Centurion and Gloucester set after it believing it to be the galleon. Dawn revealed it was merely a fire on a mountain. Anson needed to know if the galleon was already in port, but Acapulco was nowhere in sight, so, while keeping the ships well out to sea to avoid detection, he sent one of the ship's boats inshore to search for the port and to see if the ship had arrived. After five days they returned, unable to even locate the port. After sailing further along the coast the boat was sent out again and this time they found Acapulco but also captured three fishermen who confirmed that the galleon had arrived three weeks earlier but the outbound galleon, loaded with silver, was to sail on 3 March, in two weeks. It had a crew of 400 and 58 guns.

The plan was that Centurion and Gloucester would take part in any action, so Anson's men were concentrated on these ships, supplemented by slaves taken from the Spanish who were trained how to use the guns and promised their freedom. They would stay far enough offshore during the day to avoid being sighted but come in close at night in case the galleon tried to escape under cover of darkness. The three prize ships had minimal crew but were still useful to maintain a lookout further out. Nothing happened. The Spanish had spotted the ship's boat as it had sailed along the coast and had decided not to send the galleon, rightly suspecting that a trap had been set. There was no hope of a successful attack on the well-defended city so Anson gave up his frustrating wait at the start of April as water was running dangerously low and headed north-east to Zihuatanejo where William Dampier had reported a good water source. He left seven men in a cutter on patrol outside Acapulco to report later just in case the galleon sailed. Watering proved much more difficult than expected as the river had reshaped the landscape since Dampier's visit in 1685 so the men had to walk a half-mile inland to reach water of barely acceptable quality.

Since the Spanish were now on alert for his squadron, it was obvious that the way home would be by way of China to either the Portuguese colony at Macau or further up the river to Canton, a base for the English East India company, rather than back around Cape Horn. Before leaving though, there was still the question of what to do with the prize ships. Anson had already decided to destroy Carmelo and Carmin and given the severe shortage of men on Centurion and Gloucester, he concluded there was no choice but to also sacrifice Arranzazu, now renamed Tryal's Prize and transfer the men, even though the impressive 600-ton ship was "in good repair and fit for sea". This was against the determined argument of the officers from Tryal since their transfer would mean loss of seniority and therefore pay and prize money.

The cutter had not reappeared so Anson sailed back toward Acapulco in the hope of finding his men. Concluding that they had been captured, he sent six Spanish prisoners ashore in a small boat with a note saying he would release the rest if his men were set free. On the third day waiting for a reply, the cutter appeared but not from out of the harbour. The crew were in very poor health after being unable to land to find water and suffering from severe sunburn after six weeks in an open boat. On their arrival, Anson sent 57 of his prisoners ashore including all the Spaniards but kept 43 non-Spaniards. On 6 May 1742 they headed west into the Pacific.

=== Pacific crossing ===
Based on earlier accounts, Anson expected the Pacific crossing to be an easy one, taking about two months. Other voyagers had dropped south from Acapulco at 15°51'N to pick up the tradewinds that blew constantly to the west between 10° and 14°N. However, none of them had left in May by which time the band of favourable wind had moved further north as summer approached. Centurion and Gloucester wasted seven weeks in constant heat and variable light wind, or no wind at all, getting as far south as 6°40'N before giving up and heading north again. Under normal circumstances, such a delay would be a nuisance but with ships and crew in poor condition, disaster soon unfolded. The foremast of Centurion split just days out from Acapulco and Gloucester lost its mainmast in mid-June and although improvised repairs were made, she was now much slower. Scurvy broke out first amongst the prisoners captured from the Spanish prize vessels and then at the end of June, amongst the regular crew members.

During July, Gloucester lost most of its remaining rigging and a large leak opened so that by 13 August the water inside was seven feet deep despite continuous pumping. Captain Mitchell sent a distress signal to Anson but the initial response was that leaks in Centurion were now so serious that she too was in danger of sinking. However, when the full details emerged, Anson saw there were no alternative but to salvage whatever possible from Gloucester (not much except the captured bullion), transfer the crew and then set the ship on fire to ensure that the hulk did not drift into Spanish-held Guam. Eight to ten men were dying every day and the leak became so severe that even Anson had to take his turn at the pump. It was now a race to find land, even Guam, before the ship sank. Tinian lies to the north and a little east of Guam and was sighted on 23 August but it took four days to find safe anchorage. Anson had a Spanish flag hoisted in the hope of gaining a better reception and a proa carrying four native people and one Spaniard came out to meet them. Fortunately they were the only ones on the island so Centurion came inshore and anchored. The sick were landed, 128 in all, a task that Anson and the crew of the proa helped with but 21 died during the landing or immediately after.

The island was a lush tropical paradise with an abundance of fruit and other edible greens near the beach, but also fresh water and cattle which had been brought there to provide meat for the Spanish garrison on Guam. Within just a few days, the men showed clear signs of improvement. Of particular note was the breadfruit tree. The fruit is high in starch and when boiled and then baked has a taste between potato and bread. The high praise given it by Dampier's earlier expedition and the crew of Centurion later prompted Joseph Banks to send HMS Bounty on an ill-fated voyage to take the plant to grow in the British West Indies. Having avoided drowning, the next priority was to repair Centurion. The crew shifted the cannon and later the powder barrels aft to lift the bow out of the water and the carpenters found much to replace and caulk but when the cannon and barrels were put back, the water rushed in again. The leak was apparently not going to be found and fixed without proper port facilities.

The one major shortcoming of Tinian was the lack of a protected anchorage and so when a violent storm blew up at night on 18 September, the ship was blown out to sea. For the skeleton crew of 109 men and boys on board the ship and the 107 men on the island, this event was profoundly distressing. Although Lieutenant Saumarez on Centurion had lit flares and fired the signal cannon, the fury of the storm meant that nobody on shore was even aware of what had happened until the following morning. Given the state of the ship and continuing easterly winds, it was assumed by those on shore that Centurion had been blown so far west that if the crew were lucky, they might be able to make Macau where they would have to refit, or more likely, that she had sunk. In either case, they were now on their own.

There was a small bark on the island, a boat built to carry beef back to Guam, which could perhaps hold 30 men and so in its present state was clearly inadequate. Not wishing to go to Guam where they would rot in prison, or worse, it was decided to lengthen and refit the bark and attempt the 2,200-mile (3,500 km) voyage to Macau. As work progressed, there were mounting concerns about the ability to fit all aboard, the lack of provisions that would keep on a long voyage and the lack of navigational instruments. Many privately expressed a preference to remain on the island preferring a secure, if lonely, existence to the prospect of perishing at sea. To everyone's astonishment, Centurion reappeared after 19 days causing even Anson to show emotion. The crew had battled heroically to keep her afloat contending with unlashed cannons rolling about, open gun ports allowing the ocean to surge in, the anchor dangling below and only having the mizzenmast rigged, all the while dealing with the original leak in the hull. Gradually control was regained and the ship was able to sail upwind to regain Tinian.

A few days later she was blown off again, this time with most of the men aboard and they were able to get back five days later. Although still not seaworthy, on 20 October, after taking on fresh water and fruit, Centurion set sail for Macau, arriving after some difficulties finding and then getting into port, on 11 November. The Portuguese had established the settlement in 1557 but in the years since, much of the European commercial activity had moved up the Pearl River to Canton. In both areas though, the Chinese maintained firm control, as Anson would soon learn to his frustration. His cause was not helped by his refusal to pay port charges in keeping with standard European practice at the time where merchant vessels were inspected and charged but visiting naval vessels were exempt. The Chinese drew no such distinction and as such considered the refusal as an attack on their sovereignty. The Portuguese governor of Macau said he could do nothing to help without instructions from the Chinese provincial chuntuck, or Viceroy, in Canton but when Anson hired a boat to take him there, the Chinese initially prevented him from boarding. On arrival, he was told to let the local merchants act as intermediaries but no progress was made after waiting a month.

Amongst the Chinese merchants, Centurion was regarded as some sort of pirate vessel, having destroyed other ships and disrupted Pacific trade by keeping the Acapulco galleon in port, a view apparently promoted by European rivals. The activities of the British East India Company were at the mercy of the Chinese authorities and so their interest was to keep Anson at some distance, at least until their four ships had left port for the season. Now back in Macau, Anson wrote directly to the Viceroy noting that his attempts to contact him through normal channels had failed and issuing a "demand" for help of all kind. Two days later, a high-ranking mandarin arrived with other officials and carpenters to make an inspection. When touring the ship, the mandarin was impressed by the 24-pounders and the implicit threat of damage they could inflict. Permission to work on the ship was granted, most likely because the Chinese realized it was in their interest to refit the vessel to get rid of her. Soon the ship was completely unloaded and a hundred men set to work while the ship was careened.

=== Capture of the Acapulco galleon ===
The Centurion capturing the Covadonga by Samuel Scott

Although Anson had made it known that the ship would be leaving for Jakarta and thence to England, he had decided that having failed so dismally to fulfill the ambitious orders given to him, he would attempt to salvage something of the expedition and seize the galleon just before it arrived in the Philippines. It was a huge gamble as there were likely to be two ships this season since his arrival off Acapulco had kept the previous galleon in port. Shortly after leaving Macau on 19 April 1743, Anson informed the crew, who were delighted at the news. All had suffered terribly and lost friends so the capture would at least provide immense financial reward. Upon reaching Cape Espiritu Santo, the normal landfall of the galleon, on 20 May, the top sails were taken down to prevent the ship being spotted from land and the ship began a routine of tacking backwards and forwards to remain on station and practising on the guns. There were 227 men aboard compared with the normal 400 so what they lacked in numbers would have to be compensated for in speed and accuracy. Just as they were giving up hope, the galleon was spotted on the morning of 20 June. There was only one.

At noon, Centurion manoeuvered to cut off the galleon's escape to land and at one o'clock crossed in front of the Spanish vessel at very close range allowing all her big guns to fire at their target while preventing the Spaniards from returning fire. Meanwhile, marksmen stationed up the masts picked off their counterparts in the masts opposite, the galleon's officers on the deck and those manning the guns. The ships drifted further apart but the Centurion was still able to fire grapeshot across the galleon's deck and smash cannonballs into her hull.

After ninety minutes, the Spanish surrendered. Anson sent Philip Saumarez and 10 men over and they found a ghastly scene with the decks of the Nuestra Señora de Covadonga "covered with carcasses, entrails and dismembered limbs". On the Centurion one man had died, two more would later of their wounds and 17 had been injured. The ship had been hit by perhaps 30 shots. On the Covadonga, the grim figures were 67 dead, 84 wounded and 150 shots. It was carrying 1,313,843 pieces of eight (containing 33.5 tonnes of silver) and 35,682 ounces/1.07 tonnes of silver. In total 34.5 tonnes of silver was captured, worth 54 million US dollars in 2011 prices.

The Spanish had learned of Anson's presence in the Pacific when they had called in at Guam and though the Portuguese captain had suggested an alternative but longer route to Manila, he had been overruled by the Spanish officers. A merchant in Canton had sent two letters to the governor of the Philippines, the first noting the dreadful condition of the Centurion on arrival but the second, noting that the ship had been repaired and voicing suspicion that Anson might be aiming to intercept the galleon. Despite this, only a half-hearted effort was made, sending a guard ship which ran aground, leaving the galleon unprotected. The galleon itself at 700 tons was smaller than Centurion but was shockingly unprepared for attack. There were 44 cannon aboard, but 12 of those were packed away. The rest were only 6 to 12-pounders and were mounted on exposed decks. There were also 28 swivel guns, but since the men on the Centurion made no attempt to board, these were of little concern, and in any case, those manning them would have been killed by the marksmen or the grapeshot.

Anson needed to get away as soon as possible in case any Spanish ships appeared and had decided to return to Macau. He sent another 40 men to the galleon and by nightfall, the most urgent repairs had been completed. Three hundred prisoners were transferred to Centurion and forced into the hold with two hatches left open to provide some air but four swivel guns pointed at each to prevent escape. They were limited to one pint of water each per day and though none died on the trip to Macau which was reached on 11 July, conditions below were appalling.

=== Canton ===
Anson's reappearance in China was greeted with disbelief and alarm by both the Chinese authorities and the European merchants. On his previous visit, the Centurion was clearly in distress but now with the battered Covadonga in tow, it confirmed Chinese fears that he was using their port as a base for piracy or warfare while the Europeans worried that their trading privileges might be revoked and that the loss of the galleon's cargo would ruin the trade with Manila.

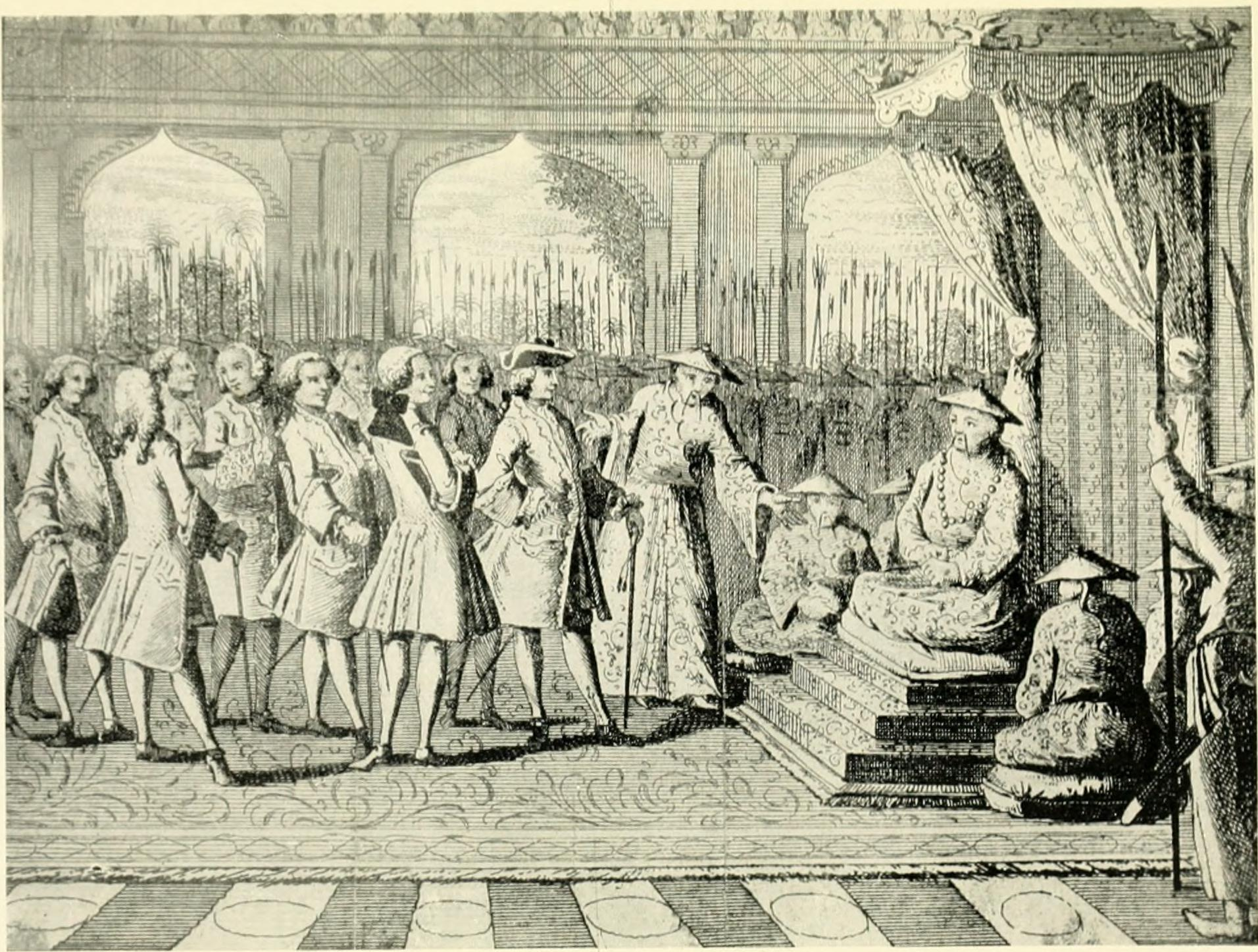
The reception of Anson and his officers by the Viceroy of Canton

On reaching Macau, Anson sent 60 or 70 prisoners ashore before the Chinese stopped him unloading the rest and then made way for Canton, intending this time not to be trifled with by the Chinese. The mandarin in charge of the fort at Bocca Tigris came aboard but was intimidated by the ship's heavy guns and instead tried to persuade the hired pilots to misguide the ship through the shoals. On learning of this, Anson threatened to hang one of them if the ship ran aground. Once past the forts, the ship waited for the permit to proceed upstream. Anson ordered that one of the heavy guns be fired twice a day to ensure that no subterfuge would be attempted on them again. After two weeks and some politics, the permit arrived allowing him to get to Whampoa, just short of Canton and most of the prisoners were put onto boats to be taken to Macau. He was able to secure fresh provisions but the merchants would not supply "sea provisions". Anson was anxious to put his case directly to the Viceroy and had issued a request on arrival but been told to wait till after summer. Anson sent a message saying he would arrive on 1 October but as they were about to set off one messenger said that the Viceroy wanted to postpone the meeting and then another came saying that he had waited all day and was offended that Anson had not showed up.

Anson then invited himself to stay at the British factory in Canton which, like those of other nations, was just outside the city wall on the riverbank. Foreigners were forbidden to enter the city, to carry firearms and officially were only allowed contact with the Hong merchants. At the end of each trading season, they had to leave for Macau or leave China entirely. Although he was able to collect the stores he needed, he could not get permission to take them onto the ship. Fate intervened and his crew won praise for fighting a major fire in the city. An invitation to see the Viceroy on 30 November arrived shortly thereafter.

In an occasion marked by great ceremony, Anson noted through an interpreter the many attempts he had made to secure an audience through intermediaries but since they had been insincere, he had been forced to send his officer to the city gate with a letter to be delivered directly to the Viceroy. The Viceroy assured him that the letter was indeed the first time he had been made aware of Anson's arrival. Anson then explained that the right season for returning to Europe had now arrived, that provisions were ready but he just needed the Viceroy's assent. This was immediately given. No mention was made of the unpaid port fees and Anson believed that a precedent had been set but when the next British warship entered Canton in 1764, it paid normal duties.

=== Return to England ===
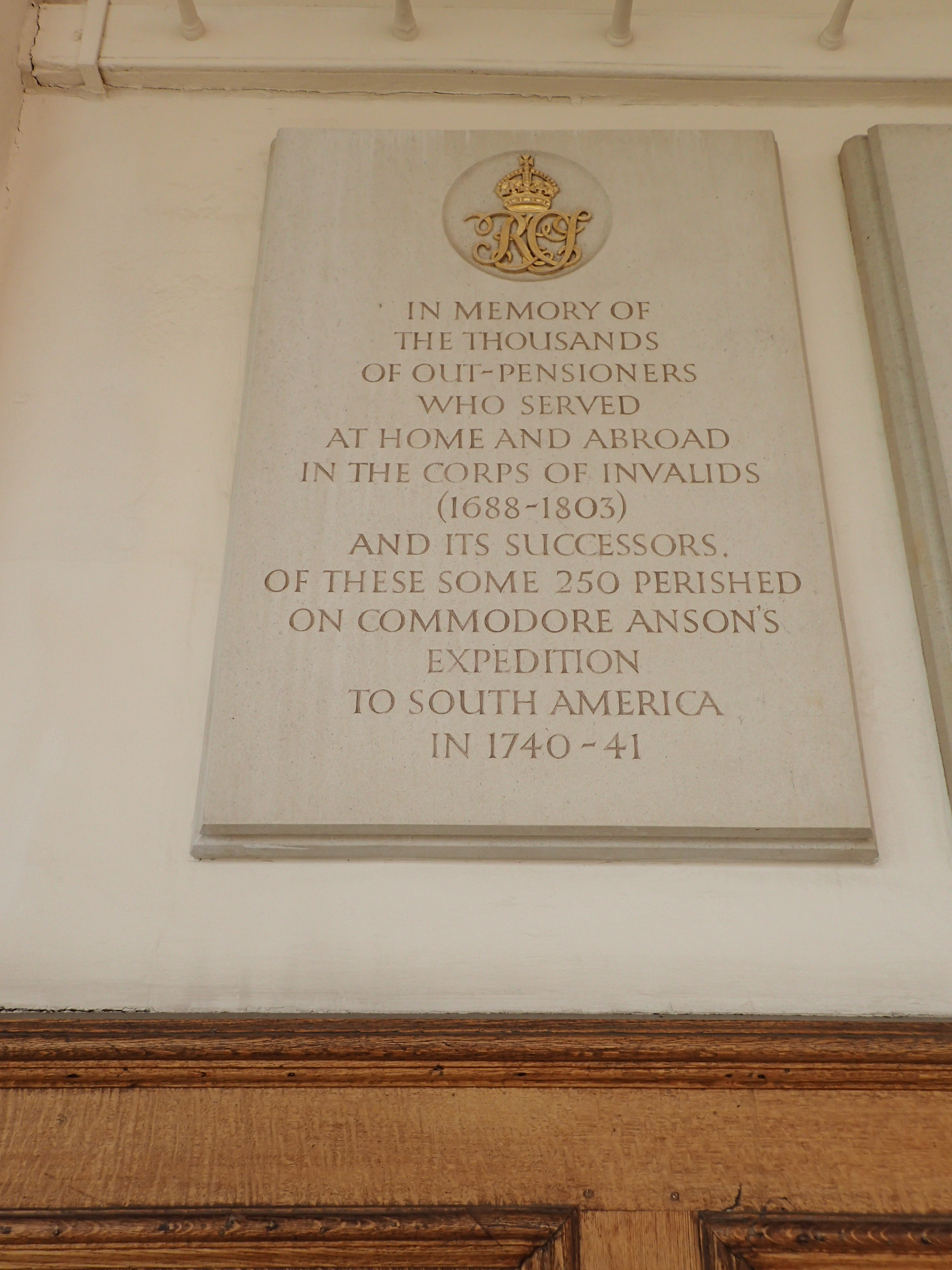
A memorial to the Corps of Invalids and the 250 men that died on Anson's voyage at the Royal Hospital Chelsea

On 7 December 1743, they sailed from Canton and stopping at Macau, sold the galleon at the heavily discounted price of 6,000 dollars, allowing the Centurion to leave on the 15th. Anson was anxious to reach England before news of the treasure he was carrying reached France or Spain, lest they attempt to intercept him. The ship stopped on 8 January at Prince's Island in the Straits of Sunda between the Indonesian islands of Sumatra and Java for fresh water and other supplies and reached Cape Town near the Cape of Good Hope on 11 March. He left on 3 April after acquiring additional crew and reached home at Spithead on 15 June 1744, having slipped through fog and thus avoided a French squadron that was cruising the English Channel. Of those on board, 188 were all that remained of the original crews of Centurion, Gloucester, Tryal and Anna. Together with the survivors of Severn, Pearl and Wager, about 500 had survived of the original 1900 that had sailed in September 1740, all but a handful falling to disease or starvation. Anson became a celebrity on his return and was invited to meet the King. When the treasure was paraded through the streets of London it was greeted by huge crowds.

Disputes over prize money ended up in court and turned the officers against one another. The main question was the status of the officers from Gloucester and Tryal once they came aboard the Centurion since Anson had not formally promoted them to be officers on the flagship. By the Admiralty rule books, they lost their rank and were effectively just ordinary seamen, but it seems obvious that without the transfer of experienced officers from the other ships, the Centurion would not have survived the Pacific or been able to capture the galleon. The difference for one officer was receiving either £500 or £6,000 and though the courts initially decided in favour of the officers of the Gloucester and Tryal, they lost on appeal, a decision that may have been influenced by now-Admiral Anson's victory over the French fleet at the Battle of Cape Finisterre.

Anson took three-eighths of the prize money available for distribution from the Covadonga which by one estimate came to £91,000 compared with the £719 he earned as captain during the 3 year 9-month voyage. By contrast, a seaman would have received perhaps £300, although even that amounted to 20 years' wages.

== Recording of events ==
Although several private journals of the voyage had been published, the official version of events was published in London 1748, as A Voyage Round the World in 1740-4 by George Anson Esq, now Lord Anson, Commander-in-Chief of a Squadron of His Majesty's Ships Sent upon an Expedition to the South Seas Compiled from his Papers and Materials by Richard Walter, MA, Chaplain of His Majesty's Ship The Centurion, in that Expedition. It was a great popular and commercial success and a 5th edition was already in print by 1749. As well as detailing the adventures of the expedition, it contained a huge amount of useful information for future navigators and with 42 detailed charts and engravings, most based on drawings by Capt. Piercy Brett, it laid the basis for later scientific and survey expeditions by Captain Cook and others. The final words from the authorized account were:

Thus was this expedition finished, when it had lasted three years and nine months, after having, by its event, strongly evinced this important truth: That though prudence, intrepidity, and perseverance united are not exempted from the blows of adverse fortune, yet in a long series of transactions they usually rise superior to its power, and in the end rarely fail of proving successful.

=== Contested authorship ===
The identity of the true author of such a successful book has been a matter of controversy. It is claimed as known "mostly only to the eruditi" that the ghost writer, in whole or in part, of the work was the mathematician Benjamin Robins, who had previously written under Anson's patronage on the subject of artillery reform in the Royal Navy. Lord Anson's chaplain Richard Walter (c.1716-1785), who had been a member of the voyage until December 1742, after the fleet's arrival in Macau, was credited as the author on the title page and dedication, having instigated the project, whilst Benjamin Robins is said to have been paid £1,000 for his work. The book however is "unquestionably the work of a man familiar with the daily life on board a ship of war", and according to Laughton (1900) Robins was not such a man, but may have taken a greater or less part in the work of revision, with a definitely ascertained share in the authorship confined to the discussion of the nautical observations in the second volume. That Walter had not been the main author was an assertion disputed by his widow, who stated as follows: During the time of Mr Walter's writing that Voyage he visited me almost daily previous to our marriage, and I have frequently heard him say how closely he had been engaged in writing for some hours to prepare for his constant attendance upon Lord Anson, at six every morning, for his approbation, as his lordship overlooked every sheet that was written. At some of those meetings Mr Robins assisted, as he was consulted in the disposition of the drawings; and I also know that Mr Robins left England - for he was sent to Bergen-op-Zoom some months before the publication of the book - and I have frequently seen Mr Walter correct the proof-sheets for the printer.

== Consequences ==
Anson was compared with Francis Drake and was promoted accordingly, reaching First Lord of the Admiralty in 1751 but he assisted the careers of many of the officers that sailed with him. Immediately after his return though, Anson had promoted Philip Saumarez and Peircy Brett but after the Admiralty refused to confirm Brett, Anson declined his own promotion.

As a direct result of the ambiguous legal situation after the wreck of Wager, the rules were changed to give captains continuing authority over their crew with the crew continuing to be paid. Similarly, after Anson had felt a need to impress the mandarins that came aboard and to distinguish his crew from those of merchant vessels, naval uniforms were introduced. Previously, the officers and seamen made their own arrangements.

The return of Anson's expedition raised interest in the Pacific as an object of British trade and imperial power but given the treacherous conditions around Cape Horn and the Spanish hold of South America, there was hope that an alternative route to the Pacific might be found through the Northwest Passage over the top of North America. An expedition led by Middleton had been mounted while Anson was away but had been blocked by ice. The government offered £20,000 to anyone that could find a navigable route but a private expedition by Moor and Smith in 1746–47 likewise returned empty-handed.

Anson pressed for follow-up expeditions of discovery after peace was reached with Spain but relations between the countries were still delicate and the voyages were canceled for fear of provoking a wider dispute. Spanish charts seized from the Covadonga added many islands to the British charts of the Pacific, and those in the Western North Pacific became known as the Anson Archipelago.

Given the horrific losses to scurvy, it is hard to understand why there was no official investigation into its cause and possible cures. That it could be cured was obvious from the rapid improvements shown by Anson's men after reaching both Juan Fernandez and Tinian. In one of the first world's first controlled experiments, the Scottish physician James Lind made his own investigations on the Salisbury in 1747. Working with twelve victims he separated them into six pairs and tried something different on each pair. The pair that received oranges and lemons showed definite improvement. However, the idea of a nutritional-deficiency disease, and the complex mechanism of action involved in scurvy, were not yet imagined. It would be another 50 years before Lind's conclusion was put into practice, and even longer before the science behind it was understood.

It also trained some of the finest naval commanders of the generation, including Augustus Keppel, John Byron and John Campbell.

The last known survivor of those that had accompanied Lord Anson was previously thought to be Joseph Allen, who had been a surgeon on the trip, and later went on to become Master of Dulwich College. He died on 10 January 1796 in his eighty-third year. But the South Brent, Devon (U.K.) parish church burial register for April 1815 records the burial of: "William Henham, of Owleigh in the parish of Ugborough; April 11; aged 93y. Three days since he was the only man alive that sailed round the world with Lord Anson. G. Baker, Vicar".

== In popular culture ==
- "The Castaway" (1799) by William Cowper
- F. Van Wyck Mason's novel, Manila Galleon, is a fictional account of Anson's voyage.
- Patrick O'Brian's The Golden Ocean (1956) and The Unknown Shore (1959) both depict fictional pairs of young men loosely based on real seaman who participated in Anson's voyage. In these two novels, O'Brian had a pair of central characters, as he did in the characters of Jack Aubrey and Stephen Maturin in the Aubrey-Maturin series published from 1969 to 2000.

== Bibliography ==
- "George Lord Anson" , Encyclopædia Britannica, vol. II (9th ed.), New York: Charles Scribner's Sons, 1878, p. 93.
- Laughton, John Knox (1885). "Anson, George (1697-1762)" . Dictionary of National Biography. Vol. 02. pp. 31–36.
- Masefield, John, ed. (1911), A Voyage Round the World in the Years 1740–4 by Lord Anson, London: J.M. Dent & Sons.
- Walter, Richard; Robins, Benjamin, eds. (1748), Voyage Round the World in the Years MDCCXL, I, II, III, IV by George Anson, Esq; Commander in Chief of a Squadron of His Majesty's Ships, sent upon an Expedition to the South-Seas, London: John and Paul Knapton for the author.
- Rodger, N.A.M. (2004). The Command of the Ocean : a Naval History of Britain 1649-1815. London: Allen Lane. ISBN 9780713994117.
- Williams, Glyn (2001), The Prize of All the Oceans, New York: Viking, ISBN 0-670-89197-5.
