= Peregrine Bertie (of Low Leyton) =

English politician

Peregrine Bertie (?1723 – 28 December 1786) was a Tory Member of Parliament. Member of a junior branch of the Bertie family seated at his mother's estate of Low Leyton, Essex, he was returned for Westbury from 1753 to 1774 by the senior branch of the family, the Earls of Abingdon, where he was in continuous opposition to the successive Whig administrations.

== Family and education ==
This branch of the Bertie family originated with Sir Peregrine Bertie (c.1584–1639), younger son of Peregrine Bertie, 13th Baron Willoughby de Eresby. Sir Peregrine was succeeded by his son Nicholas (d. 1671/2), of St Martin-in-the-Fields, who was followed by his son Peregrine Bertie (d. 1721), of Long Sutton, Lincolnshire. His son was Peregrine Bertie (d. 1743), a barrister, who in 1720 married Elizabeth, daughter of John Hungerford and widow of John Fisher. She inherited the estate of Low Leyton, Essex from her first husband.

Their son, Peregrine Bertie, entered the Middle Temple on 29 February 1739/40, and matriculated at Magdalen College, Oxford on 12 December 1740 at the age of 17. Upon his father's death in 1743, he succeeded to the family estates. Bertie was awarded his MA on 31 January 1744/5 and was called to the bar on 3 May 1745.

On 18 October 1753 at All Saints, Little Billing, Northamptonshire, by licence, he married Catherine (died 2 July 1770), the daughter of Richard Backwell. By her he had two sons and four daughters, of whom three daughters survived him:

- Peregrine Bertie
- Richard Bertie
- Catherine Dorothy Bertie (d. 23 January 1823), married Thomas Hoar, subsequently Bertie, in 1788, without issue
- Elizabeth Bertie, married Ralph Hoar, brother of Thomas, in 1788, without issue
- Mary Bertie, married Samuel Lichigaray (1751–1812) in 1782
- Frances Bertie

After Catherine's death, on 16 September 1771, Bertie married Elizabeth Peart, sister-in-law of Lord George Manners-Sutton, but had by her no children.

== Politics ==
Bertie's fourth cousin, the 3rd Earl of Abingdon, a Tory, had a strong electoral interest in Westbury. However, the borough was regularly contested on behalf of the Whig Government, and Bertie's candidates, victorious in the 1747 election, were unseated by an election petition in 1748 and replaced by the Government supporters. The death of one of these, Matthew Michell, in 1753, allowed Abingdon to return Bertie for Westbury in the Tory interest.

Bertie voted with the opposition against the propriety of general warrants in February 1764. The Duke of Newcastle thought him an ally, but after the fall of the Grenville Ministry, he was not supportive of the first Rockingham Ministry and opposed the repeal of the Stamp Act. He continued in opposition to the Chatham Ministry, standing down from Parliament in 1774. No speeches in the House of Commons on his part are known.

== Bibliography ==
- Maddison, A. R. (1902). Lincolnshire Pedigrees. Vol. v. I.
- Sturgess, H. A. C. (1949). Register of Admissions to the Honourable Society of the Middle Temple. Vol. v. 1. London: Butterworth & Co.

Parliament of Great Britain
Preceded by Chauncy Townsend; Matthew Michell	Member of Parliament for Westbury; 1753–1774; With: Chauncy Townsend 1753–1768; William Blackstone 1768–1770; Hon. Charles Dillon 1770–1774	Succeeded by Hon. Thomas Wenman; Nathaniel Bayly
