= HMS Pearl (1726) =

5th rate ship of the Royal Navy

History

Great Britain
- Name: HMS Pearl
- Ordered: c. 1722
- Builder: Deptford Dockyard
- Laid down: January 1723
- Launched: 17 October 1726
- Fate: Sold for breaking up on 28 June 1744

General characteristics
- Class & type: 40-gun fifth rate
- Tons burthen: 594 55/94 (bm)
- Length: 124 ft (37.8 m) (gun deck); 101 ft 8 in (31.0 m) (keel)
- Beam: 33 ft 2 in (10.11 m)
- Depth of hold: 14 ft (4.3 m)
- Sail plan: Full-rigged ship
- Complement: 190
- Armament: Lower gundeck: 20 × 12-pounder guns; Upper gundeck: 20 × 6-pounder guns

HMS Pearl was a 40-gun fifth rate of the Royal Navy. It was used during the War of Jenkins' Ear, and was one of the ships dispatched under Commodore George Anson for his raids on Spanish possessions in the Pacific.

== Construction and commissioning ==
Pearl was ordered from Deptford Dockyard around 1722, to be built to the designs of the 1719 Establishment. She was a titular rebuild of an earlier HMS Pearl launched in 1708. The new ship was laid down in January 1723 under the supervision of Master Shipwright Richard Stacey, and was launched on 17 October 1726, having cost £6,376.1.7d to build. She was commissioned in 1727 under the command of Captain Sir Hugh Middleton.

== Career ==
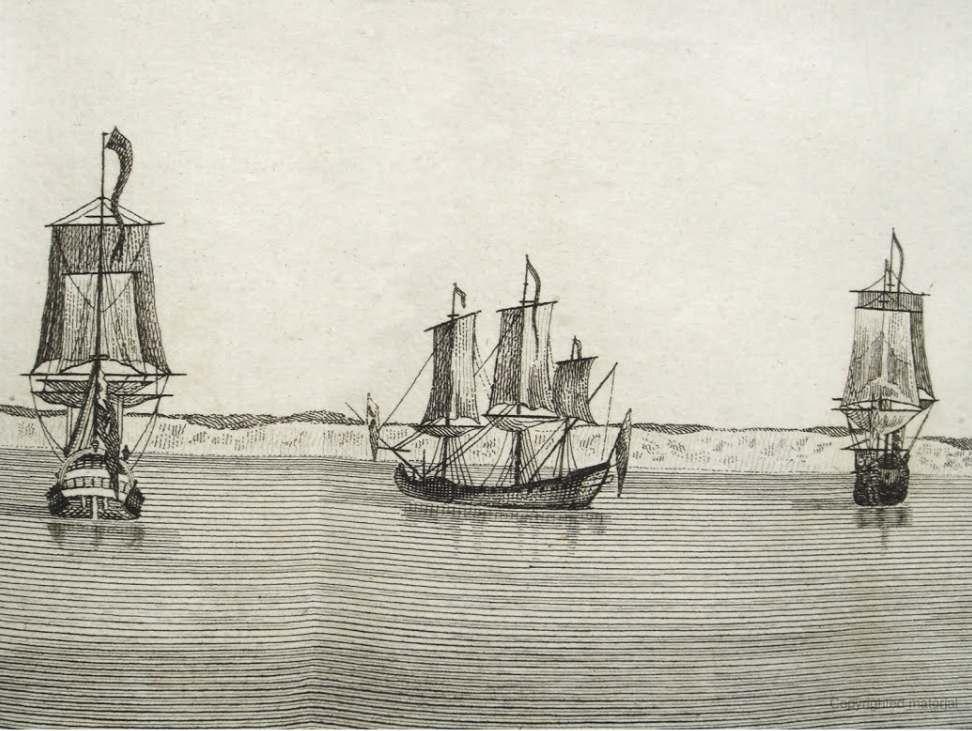
Lieutenant Piercy Brett's sketch of HMS Centurion, HMS Wager, and HMS Pearl, off Cape Virgin Mary, on 7 March 1741

Sir Hugh's time in command was short-lived, he underwent a court-martial and was dismissed in October 1727. Captain Samuel Pitman was appointed to command Pearl in Sir Hugh's stead in November 1727, and he took her out to the Leeward Islands. Pitman died while in command on 5 October 1728, and in 1729 Captain John Trotter took over, with Pearl still in the Leeward Islands. In 1731 she came under the command of Captain FitzRoy Henry Lee, who sailed to Guinea later that year, before returning to Britain in 1732. While in home waters Pearl underwent a small repair at Woolwich Dockyard between January and April 1733, before recommissioning under her former commander, Captain Trotter. Pearl went back to the Leeward Islands, returning to Britain once more and undergoing a more substantial repair at Sheerness from October 1737 to May 1738, Trotter having left the ship in 1736.

Pearl was back in commission by the middle of 1738, this time under Captain Edward Legge. With the War of Jenkins' Ear having broken out, she departed England on 23 July 1739 with Admiral Edward Vernon's squadron, bound for Lisbon. In June 1740 she came under the command of Captain Matthew Michell, this time assigned to the squadron under Commodore George Anson, with orders to raid Spanish possessions in the Pacific. The expedition was hampered by numerous setbacks, and Pearl underwent several changes of commander as men died of scurvy and disease. Captain Dandy Kidd had taken over command by December 1740, but he died on 23 January 1741, and was replaced by Captain George Murray. Pearl lost contact with the main force of the expedition on 10 April 1741, and returned to Britain. She was at Barbados in July 1742, before being ordered back to Britain.

The Admiralty issued an order on 22 April 1743 for her to be broken up and a new ship built, but this was later countermanded by an order dated 16 June 1744, and Pearl was sold on 28 June 1744 for the sum of £266.
