= Chauncy Townsend =

British politician (1708–1770)

Chauncy Townsend (23 February 1708 – 28 March 1770) was a City of London merchant and a Member of Parliament in the Parliament of Great Britain. He was prominent in developing coalmines in the Swansea area of Wales and in supplying settler needs in Nova Scotia.

== Career ==
The son of Jonathan Townsend, he started his business career as a London linen draper, before becoming a merchant in about 1740. He developed extensive interests in coal mines in the Swansea area, along with mining, smelting, and refining copper and lead. From 1744, he was as a government contractor supplying military and settler needs in Nova Scotia.

By the time of his death, most of Townsend's money had been consumed by the mining business.

== Parliament ==
Townsend was a regular supporter, in the House of Commons, of whatever government the King appointed. He represented Westbury between 1748 and 1768. He was elected for Wigtown Burghs in 1768 and sat for them until his death in 1770. He was the second Englishman to be elected and the first to actually sit in Parliament, for any Scottish constituency. Despite being a Member of Parliament for 22 years, he is not recorded as ever having spoken in the House.

== Family ==
Townsend married Bridget Phipps, daughter of James Phipps in May 1730. Among their children were James Townsend MP and Joseph Townsend.

Parliament of Great Britain
Preceded by John Bance; Paul Methuen	Member of Parliament for Westbury; 1748–1768; With: Matthew Michell 1748–1753; Peregrine Bertie from 1753	Succeeded by William Blackstone; Peregrine Bertie
Preceded by George Augustus Selwyn	Member of Parliament for Wigtown Burghs; 1768–1770	Succeeded by William Stewart
