= The Castaway (poem) =

1799 Elegiac poem by William Cowper

"The Castaway" is an elegiac poem/ballad written by William Cowper in 1799. The poem is written in rhymed stanzas and gives the account of a crewman who was washed overboard during a storm. The poem is based on George Anson's Voyage around the World after Cowper read an account which told of one of the men being washed overboard and the horror that his shipmates felt as they watched him without being able to help as shown in this stanza of the poem:

        He shouted: nor his friends had fail'd
                 To check the vessel's course,
        But so the furious blast prevail'd,
                 That, pitiless perforce,
        They left their outcast mate behind,
                 And scudded still before the wind.[2]

There is one explicit reference to Anson's voyage:

        No poet wept him: but the page
                 Of narrative sincere;
        That tells his name, his worth, his age,
                 Is wet with Anson's tear.[2]

Cowper, already having dealt with several periods of depression, was emotionally struck by this tale which led him to writing the haunting words which would be his last poem published before he died in 1800. The death of Mrs. Unwin, wife of the Rev. Morley Unwin, who had befriended him in the happiest period of his life, brought "fixed despair" of which Cowper's last poem, 'The Castaway', is a terrible memorial."
