= HMS Gloucester (1711) =

Ship of the line of the Royal Navy

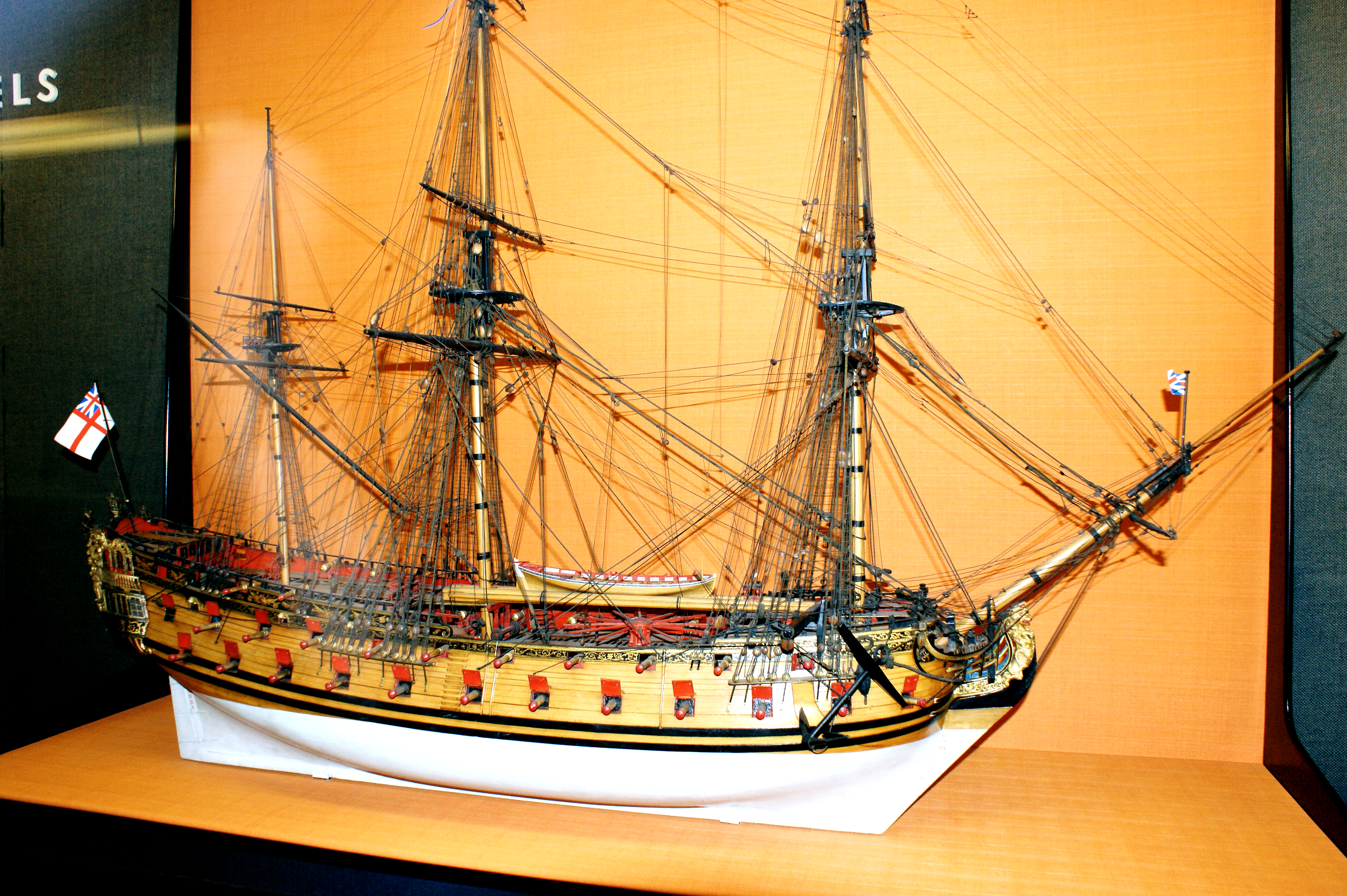
- Ship model of Gloucester

History

Great Britain
- Name: Gloucester
- Ordered: 29 July 1710
- Builder: Deptford Dockyard
- Launched: 4 October 1711
- Commissioned: 1711
- Fate: Burned to avoid capture, 1742

General characteristics (as built)
- Class & type: 1706 Establishment 50-gun fourth-rate ship of the line
- Tons burthen: 714 34/94 bm
- Length: 130 ft 8 in (39.8 m) (Gundeck)
- Beam: 35 ft 3 in (10.7 m)
- Depth of hold: 14 ft (4.3 m)
- Sail plan: Full-rigged ship
- Complement: 185–280
- Armament: 50 guns: Gundeck: 22 × 18-pdr cannon; Upper gundeck: 22 × 6-pdr cannon; Quarterdeck: 4 × 6-pdr cannon; Forecastle: 4 × 6-pdr cannon

General characteristics after 1737 rebuild
- Class & type: 1733 proposals 50-gun fourth-rate ship of the line
- Tons burthen: 863 tons bm
- Length: 134 ft (40.8 m) (gundeck)
- Beam: 38 ft 6 in (11.7 m)
- Depth of hold: 15 ft 9 in (4.8 m)
- Sail plan: Full-rigged ship
- Armament: 50 guns: Gundeck: 22 × 18-pdrs; Upper gundeck: 22 × 9-pdrs; Quarterdeck: 4 × 6-pdrs; Forecastle: 2 × 6-pdrs

HMS Gloucester was a 50-gun fourth-rate ship of the line of the Royal Navy built at Deptford by Joseph Allin in 1710/11. She participated in the War of the Spanish Succession. The ship was burned to prevent capture after she was damaged in a storm during Commodore George Anson's voyage around the world in 1742.

== Description ==
Gloucester had a length at the gundeck of 130 feet 8 inches (39.8 m) and 108 feet 1 inch (32.9 m) at the keel. She had a beam of 35 feet 3 inches (10.7 m) and a depth of hold of 14 feet (4.3 m). The ship's tonnage was 714 34/94 tons burthen. Gloucester was armed with twenty-two 18-pounder cannon on her main gundeck, twenty-two 9-pounder cannon on her upper gundeck, and four 6-pounder cannon each on the quarterdeck and forecastle. The ship had a crew of 185–280 officers and ratings.

== Construction and career ==
Gloucester, named after the eponymous port, was the fourth ship of her name to serve in the Royal Navy. She was ordered on 29 July 1710 and was built by Master Shipwright Joseph Allin to the 1706 Establishment of dimensions at Deptford Dockyard. The ship was launched on 4 October 1711 and commissioned that same year under Captain James Carlton for service in the English Channel.

Gloucester was ordered to be dismantled to be rebuilt to the dimensions of the 1719 Establishment at Sheerness on 6 November 1724 and this was completed on 20 January 1725. The rebuilding was suspended until 22 May 1733 when the ship was reordered to the 1733 revisions; she was relaunched on 22 March 1737.

== Fate ==
In 1742 Gloucester was damaged in a storm under Captain Matthew Michell, and she was burned in order to avoid her being captured.
