= HMS Hampshire (1741) =

Ship of the line of the Royal Navy

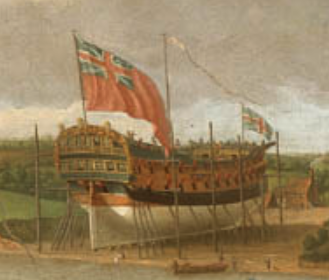
- Probably the launch of HMS Hampshire by John Cleveley the Elder

History

Great Britain
- Name: HMS Hampshire
- Ordered: 28 April 1740
- Builder: Barnard, Ipswich
- Launched: 13 November 1741
- Fate: Broken up, 1766

General characteristics
- Class & type: 1733 proposals 50-gun fourth rate ship of the line
- Tons burthen: 854 (bm)
- Length: 134 ft (40.8 m) (gundeck)
- Beam: 38 ft 6 in (11.7 m)
- Depth of hold: 15 ft 9 in (4.8 m)
- Propulsion: Sails
- Sail plan: Full-rigged ship
- Armament: 50 guns: Gundeck: 22 × 18-pounders; Upper gundeck: 22 × 9-pounders; QD: 4 × 6-pounders; Fc: 2 × 6-pounders

HMS Hampshire was a 50-gun fourth rate ship of the line of the Royal Navy, built at Ipswich by John Barnard to the 1733 proposals of the 1719 Establishment dimensions at Ipswich, and launched on 13 November 1741.

On 29 March 1742 she was under the command of Captain Thomas Limeburner when she captured Galgo, a Spanish privateer sloop of 12 guns and 12 patereros (swivel guns). She had a crew of 140 men, some of whom were English. She was a new vessel, only 14 months old, belonging to San Sebastián, and had taken 21 prizes. (Note: The article in the Gentleman's magazine erroneously places Limeburner aboard Plymouth. Charnock, however, also gives Galgo 24 guns, plus 10 patereros, and gives the date of capture as 9 April.) The Royal Navy apparently briefly took Galgo into service under her existing name.

In January 1743 Limeburner and Hampshire captured two more privateers, one of the same strength as Galgo. The other was armed with 15 guns and swivels, and had a crew of 124 men.

On 17 October 1760 Hampshire, Boreas and Lively intercepted five French vessels in the Windward Passage. On 18 October Lively captured the French 20-gun corvette Valeur. Boreas captured the frigate Sirenne, and Hampshire chased the merchant frigate Prince Edward on shore where her crew set fire to her, leading her to blow up. Prince Edward was armed with 32 guns and had a crew of 180 men under the command of Captain Dubois.

On 19 October, Hampshire, with Lively and Valeur, cornered the King's frigate Fleur de Lis in Freshwater Bay, a little to leeward of Port-de-Paix; her crew too set her on fire. Fleur de Lis was also armed with 32 guns, and had a crew of 190 men under the command of Captain Diguarty. The merchant frigate Duc de Choiseul, of 32 guns and 180 men under the command of Captain Bellevan, escaped into Port-de-Paix. The two merchant frigates carried cargoes of sugar and indigo.

== Fate ==
Hampshire served until being broken up in 1766.
