= Fitzroy Henry Lee =

Royal Navy officer and colonial administrator

Vice-Admiral FitzRoy Henry Lee
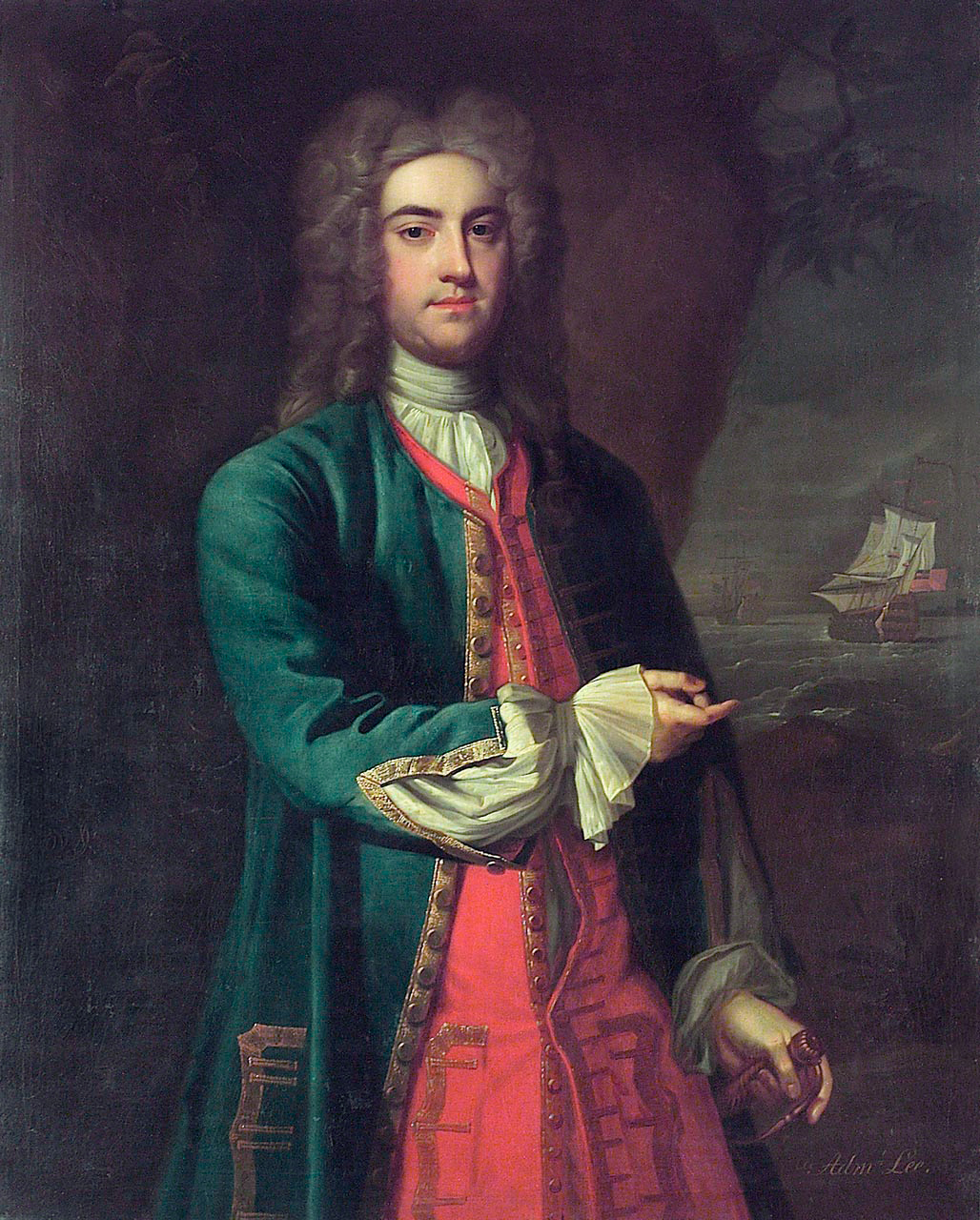
- Fitzroy Henry Lee, c. 1725
- Born: 2 January 1699
- Died: 14 April 1750 (aged 51)
- Military career
- Allegiance: Great Britain
- Branch: Royal Navy
- Service years: 1717–1750
- Rank: Vice-Admiral
- Commands: HMS Looe; HMS Pearl; HMS Falkland; Newfoundland Station; HMS Pembroke; HMS Edinburgh; HMS Suffolk; Leeward Islands Station
- Conflicts: War of the Austrian Succession

Viceregal styles of FitzRoy Henry Lee
- Reference style: His Excellency
- Spoken style: Your Excellency

Vice-Admiral Fitzroy Henry Lee (2 January 1699 – 14 April 1750) was a Royal Navy officer and colonial administrator who served as Commodore Governor of the Colony of Newfoundland. Lee supposedly inspired the character "Hawser Trunnion" in Tobias Smollett's novel, The Adventures of Peregrine Pickle.

== Life ==
Lee was the seventh son of Edward Henry Lee, 1st Earl of Lichfield, and Lady Charlotte Fitzroy, Charles II's illegitimate daughter.

Lee was born in Oxfordshire, England. He entered the Royal Navy in 1716, and obtained a promotion to lieutenant in 1722. Lee became captain of HMS Falkland in 1734 and was commissioned Governor of Newfoundland in May 1735.

Around 1746, the Navy relieved Lee of command, based on charges of debauchery and drunkenness. A pending promotion to rear-admiral was suspended. However, in October 1747, when Lee arrived back in England, the Navy reinstated his promotion, effective 15 July 1747. On 12 May 1748, Lee was promoted to vice-admiral of the white, but he had no further service,

Lee died suddenly on 14 April 1750.

== See also ==
- Governors of Newfoundland
- List of people from Newfoundland and Labrador

Political offices
Preceded by Viscount Muskerry	Commodore Governor of Newfoundland; 1735–1737	Succeeded by Philip Vanbrugh
