= HMS Severn (1695) =

Ship of the line of the Royal Navy

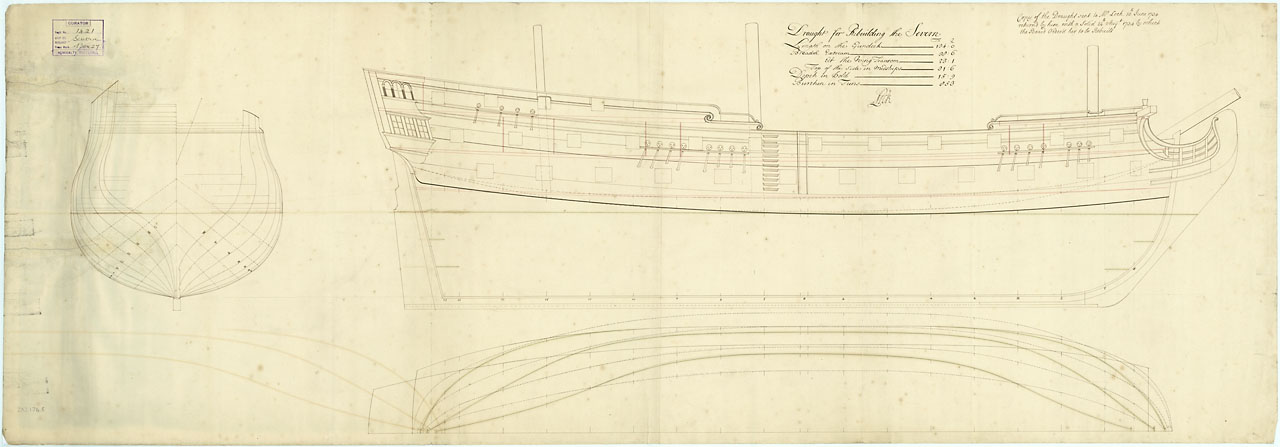
- Severn plan of the 1739 rebuild

History

Great Britain
- Name: HMS Severn
- Ordered: 16 November 1693
- Builder: Sir Henry Johnson, Blackwall Yard
- Launched: 16 September 1695
- Commissioned: 1696
- Captured: 1746

General characteristics as built
- Class & type: 50-gun fourth rate ship of the line
- Tons burthen: 683 41/94 bm
- Length: 131 ft 3 in (40.0 m) (gundeck) 109 ft (33.2 m) (keel)
- Beam: 34 ft 4 in (10.5 m)
- Depth of hold: 13 ft 6 in (4.1 m)
- Propulsion: Sails
- Sail plan: Full-rigged ship
- Armament: 50 guns: Gundeck: 20 × 12 pdrs; Upper gundeck: 22 × 9 pdrs (demi-culverins); Quarterdeck: 6 × 4 pdrs (minions); Forecastle: 2 × 4 pdrs (minions)

General characteristics after 1739 rebuild
- Class & type: 1733 proposals 50-gun fourth rate ship of the line
- Tons burthen: 853 44/94 bm
- Length: 134 ft (40.8 m) (gundeck) 108 ft 3 in (33.0 m) (keel)
- Beam: 38 ft 6 in (11.7 m)
- Depth of hold: 15 ft 9 in (4.8 m)
- Propulsion: Sails
- Sail plan: Full-rigged ship
- Armament: 50 guns: Gundeck: 22 × 18 pdrs; Upper gundeck: 22 × 9 pdrs; Quarterdeck: 4 × 6 pdrs; Forecastle: 2 × 6 pdrs

HMS Severn was a 50-gun fourth-rate ship of the line of the Royal Navy. Built under Sir Henry Johnson's direction at Blackwall Yard, she was launched on 16 September 1695 along with her sister ship HMS Burlington. The commercial contract had originally been agreed with Johnson on 16 November 1693 (for four ships - the Romney and Colchester, as well as the Severn and Burlington), but the latter two were delayed and a fresh contract for them agreed on 7 December 1694.

On 13 May 1734, orders were issued for Severn to be taken to pieces and rebuilt at Plymouth according to the 1733 proposals of the 1719 Establishment. Severn was re-launched on 28 March 1739, and served until 18 October 1746, when (under the command of Captain William Lisle) she was captured by the French 70-gun ships Terrible and Neptune in the Channel, southwest of the Isles of Scilly in defending a homebound convoy.

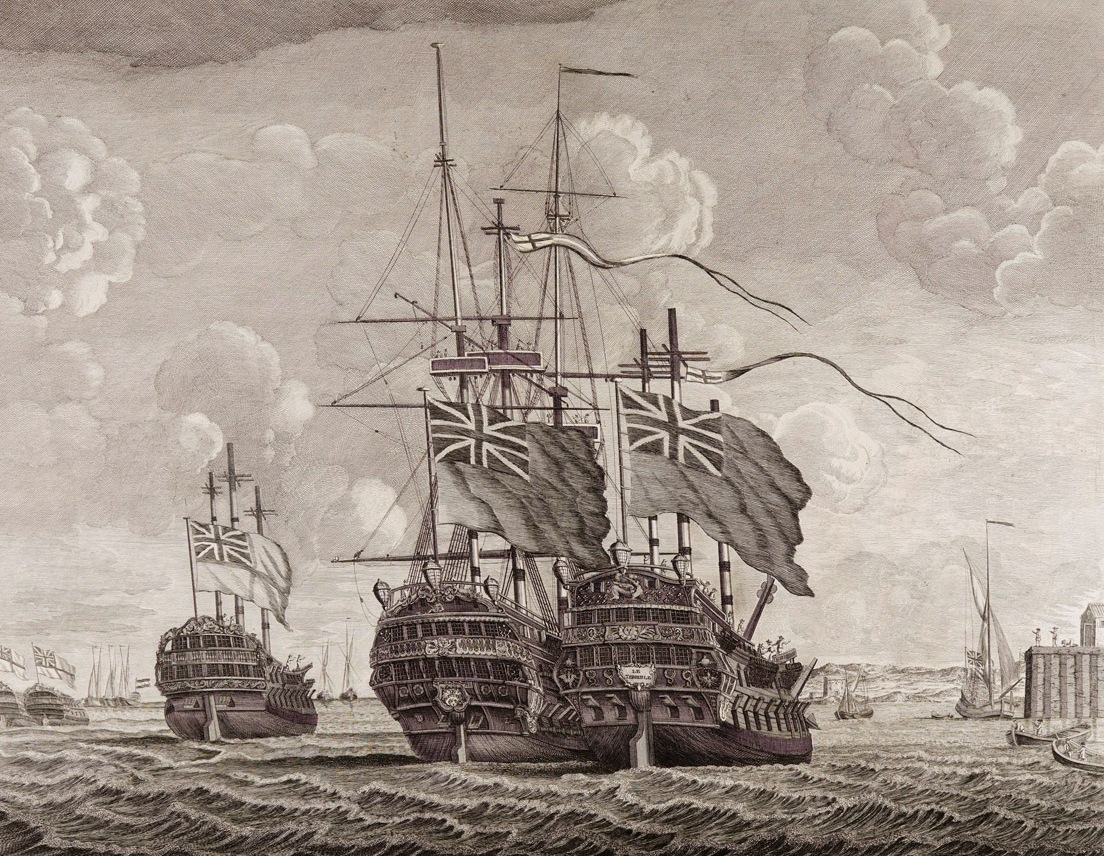
Severn (far left), was recaptured by the British at the second Battle of Cape Finisterre on 25 October 1747

Severn was captured back by the British at the second Battle of Cape Finisterre on 25 October 1747; but not taken back into service and instead taken to pieces in that year.

== See also ==
- List of ships captured in the 18th century
