= Recurring characters in the Aubrey–Maturin series =

Fictional characters by Patrick O'Brian

This is a list of recurring characters in the Aubrey–Maturin series of novels by Patrick O'Brian. As is noted in the articles about each novel, some of these characters are based on real historical persons, while others are purely fictional. Because there is an article describing each novel, links are made to those articles when mentioning the stories in which each character appears. References to page numbers, where they appear, are based upon the W. W. Norton & Company printing of the novels.

== Recurring characters ==
=== Main characters and their families ===
- Jack Aubrey is one of the heroes of the series. His rise from a young lieutenant in the Royal Navy, through the ranks of commander and post-captain to rear-admiral is chronicled thoroughly. A resourceful and powerful man, he is regarded as one of the best fighting captains in the Royal Navy. Part of Aubrey's success is the result of having been disrated from midshipman and turned before the mast as a common sailor, in part because of a love affair he has with a black girl named Sally Mputa (this occurs prior to Master and Commander, but is referred to in several novels). Though this experience is painful at the time, it gives him unique (among officers) insight into the life and beliefs of common sailors, enabling him to more effectively lead them as an officer. His own hero is Lord Nelson. His crew often follows him from ship to ship, not just because of his leadership but also due to his knack for capturing valuable prizes, for which he is nicknamed "Lucky Jack". Aubrey is also referred to by some as "Goldilocks" because of his long yellow hair. His physical characteristics, namely a large frame and scarred visage, often lead to an underestimation of his mental abilities, but he is also a renowned mathematician and amateur astronomer, a Fellow of the Royal Society. Aubrey's love of women has led to problems with the men he has cuckolded and with his wife, Sophia. His other great loves are the violin and puns, which he seems to enjoy creating as much as telling. He is both a natural and a scientific sailor, as his interest in mathematics grew rapidly from his time on HMS Lively in Post Captain. Unfortunately, as masterful and lucky as Jack is at sea, he is somewhat inept and unlucky by land, and is often forced to hurriedly take ship in order to escape his troubles. His parents were both English, and when not at sea, he is part of the landed gentry, having learned fox-hunting and cricket in his young days, still enjoyed in his adult life.
- Stephen Maturin is the series' other hero. A former Irish radical, he is a ship's surgeon who has sailed with Aubrey since his first voyage as commander. Unlike many surgeons in this era, Maturin is a physician, and is highly regarded for his intimate knowledge of anatomy and diseases. His skills have saved the lives of many of his shipmates. He is acknowledged as a man of high breeding (The Fortune of War, p. 48), and while on land he is consulted by such prominent figures as the Duke of Clarence. Maturin is also well known in the scientific community as a naturalist, specializing in comparative anatomy of birds but also willing to examine (and sometimes dissect) any interesting animal that crosses his path. His qualities as a doctor are only outshone by his skills as an intelligence agent, a profession only suspected by those he sails with but one by which he has occasionally confounded Napoleon's attempts at European domination. Despite spending so much time aboard ships, Maturin has little knowledge of their qualities and terminology, which does not stop him from trying to explain various sailing terms and maneuvers to people even less informed. His appearance—small, pale, and usually dishevelled—does not make him very appealing to the opposite sex, but that does not deter him from trying to win the heart of the beautiful Diana Villiers. Unfortunately, Maturin, from what he claims is a spirit of pure philosophical enquiry, is a regular dabbler in any intoxicating drug that comes his way. Though skirting the line that separates heavy use from addiction, he has dabbled in laudanum, a tincture of opium, coca leaves, and other local intoxicants ranging from bhang to khat, depending on where he happens to be at the moment. Maturin also has the sometimes distressing habit of bringing both live (wombats, a hive of bees, "a most discriminating" sloth) and dead animal (and human) specimens on board ship. Most are tolerated (even the bees) due to the crew's respect for Stephen's talents as a physician and natural philosopher, some, such as severed human hand and a narwhal's horn are seen as lucky talismans. He was born "the wrong side of the blanket" to an Irish father and a Catalan mother. He spent his childhood in both Ireland and Catalonia, and inherited land from his Catalan relatives. He is fluent in many languages, including English, Irish and Catalan from his upbringing, and French, Italian, Castilian Spanish and local dialects on the islands, Portuguese, Dutch, among others, and spent time learning Urdu on the long journey in HMS Surprise. On occasion he helps his shipmates out of a predicament by speaking one language in the accent of another, as part of the ruse de guerre common in the Royal Navy. He draws the line there, as his role on board ship is saving lives, not taking them. He makes an exception in The Letter of Marque, on the mission to cut out the French frigate Diane: he imprisons the intelligence officer, and then joins the fight on deck by coolly killing the ship's captain with his pistol and then his sword.
- Sophia "Sophie" Aubrey meets Jack Aubrey in Post Captain, the second novel, when he is ashore in England due to the Peace of Amiens. She is the eldest of the three Williams sisters. She is described as very beautiful, fair, tall and with a perfect complexion. She and Maturin develop a close friendship lasting to the end of the series. Sophia followed Maturin's advice to tell Aubrey her true feelings, which advice proves wise. Her similar advice to Maturin to propose to Diana Villiers is dismissed by Maturin in Post Captain, and he misses the moment (later said also by Villiers in HMS Surprise). She grows in the courage of her convictions, agreeing to meet Aubrey aboard HMS Lively in Post Captain to agree not to marry anyone else; at Madeira (HMS Surprise) by travelling on a frigate with his friend Heneage Dundas as captain; en route, the frigate, and thus Sophia, sees some action. She is Jack's wife beginning in the fourth novel, The Mauritius Command. Her upbringing and values ensure that she does not share Aubrey's history of affairs, and they have a happy marriage and three children (twin girls, Charlotte and Fanny, and a boy, George). Sophia proves to be very competent at keeping accounts, in addition to successfully managing a household whose main provider (Jack) is often absent for months at a time. She is the stable person in his life. Sophia has two younger sisters, Cecelia and Frances, who appear in Post-Captain and are mentioned in HMS Surprise. Cecelia's young daughter is raised with her twin cousins, as Cecelia travels with her husband, in The Mauritius Command. Frances is said to be having a child in Ulster in book seven of the series, The Surgeon's Mate (112). Sophia meets her husband's son from a youthful romance when, full grown, he seeks out his father for his blessing in The Reverse of the Medal. This meeting does not upset her; she hands him a note to bring to her husband in the event the two meet at the West Indies station. In The Letter of Marque, Sophia visits fictional Shelmerston to train and otherwise aid the newly hired purser for the privately owned ship Surprise.
- Mrs Williams is Aubrey's mother-in-law. In HMS Surprise, Maturin describes her as "a deeply stupid, griping, illiberal, avid, tenacious, pinchfist, a sordid lickpenny and a shrew". It is hard to see any likeness of the mother in the daughter. Despite being stingy and obsessed with money, she is quite credulous and snobbish, which leads her to get involved in, for example, an illegal bookmaking operation, where she loses a great deal of her fortune and is threatened with arrest. When Aubrey is flush with funds after returning from The Mauritius Command, he takes care of her debts, so she again owns Mapes Court free and clear, but she prefers to lease it out and live with Sophia and her grandchildren at Ashgrove Cottage. Her harsh ways drive servants away until Aubrey staffs his household with seamen who are immune to her words, and keep up the house as they would a ship. When Aubrey is found guilty in a fraud on the stock exchange (in The Reverse of the Medal), then makes a fortune in prizes on the shake-down cruise of Surprise as a letter of marque (in The Letter of Marque), she is pleased, but believes him guilty as charged, and would do the same herself if she had the chance, as one must always guard one's capital. Mrs Williams dies in an accident when the coach in which she is riding, driven by her niece Diana Villiers-Maturin, overturns.
- Samuel Mputa (aka Sam Panda) is the illegitimate son born out of Aubrey's affair with Sally Mputa during his day as a midshipman. Aubrey had no idea that Sally was pregnant when they were parted, so meets the full grown man over twenty years later. Samuel is described as identical to Aubrey in appearance and gestures except for his dark skin tone and dark hair, and he speaks English like an Irishman. He was raised by Irish Catholic missionaries in Lourenço Marques, and comes to seek his father's blessing, which he receives, in the West Indies, in The Reverse of the Medal. Samuel is headed to the Brazils with Irish missionaries, a man in minor orders who wishes to be a priest. In England with the priests, he sought out his father, but met Mrs Aubrey, who told him they might meet in the West Indies. Both Aubrey and Maturin find him to be a valuable and enjoyable companion, and thanks in part to Maturin's influence, Samuel becomes a priest and eventually Papal Nuncio to Argentina.
- General Aubrey is Jack Aubrey's father. He has embarrassed his son on numerous occasions with his politics, which swing all the way from Tory to Radical, but always in opposition to the Government. The General remarries long after Jack's mother dies. He has a son in Post Captain, providing Jack with a much younger half-brother, Philip. In The Reverse of the Medal, the General and his associates buy heavily into stocks that Aubrey unwittingly recommends to them, causing Jack Aubrey to be tried for stock fraud and briefly stripped of his rank in the Navy. The General flees the country to avoid being arrested; his corpse is later discovered in a ditch (The Letter of Marque). Jack Aubrey organizes the funeral for his father at the family estate, Woolcombe House.
- Diana Villiers is Sophia's beautiful cousin and her opposite in many respects, beginning with appearance, as she is dark-haired, slender, and her complexion suffered from her years in India with her father. With her graceful carriage she appears tall, but is shorter than Sophia (Post Captain). She has a great love of horses and riding and breeds Arabians. She rides gracefully and loves to jump barriers on a fox hunt, while Sophia enjoys the gallop, dislikes the hunt. Her impetuous nature has led to more than one ill-conceived affair, but eventually Maturin wins her over. O'Brian perhaps took her name from Frances Villiers, Countess of Jersey, the notorious mistress of the Prince Regent. During one of her many periods of disgrace, Diana is described as running about with "Lady Jersey's set." Diana temporarily flees her home after the birth of her daughter Brigid, unable to deal with the young girl's autism.
- Brigid Maturin is Stephen and Diana's daughter, born while he was away at sea. Before her father met her she was severely introverted, showing signs of what a modern doctor would diagnose as autism. After Diana's grief-driven departure, Padeen's gentle and nurturing manner helps her to connect with the world, and gain a full recovery.

=== Shipmates ===
- William Babbington is a midshipman in Aubrey's first command, HM Sloop Sophie. As a midshipman, Babbington has an almost insatiable lust for the fairer sex. Stephen notes that Babbington's stunted growth is likely the result of his frequent encounters, at an early age, with poxed ladies of the evening. Babbington is a lieutenant in Desolation Island, and later becomes a master and commander, and then a Post Captain (in The Letter of Marque), both because of his natural ability (augmented by having been trained by Aubrey), and because he has influential relations who control several seats in Parliament. As a master and commander of the ship in which Maturin and Diana travel back from Paris in The Surgeon's Mate, he solemnises their marriage (p. 382). Babbington himself later falls in love with Admiral Harte's daughter, before she is married to the traitorous Andrew Wray by her father's arrangement. He has charge of the Dryad in The Ionian Mission, missing his chance at a share of the prize taken by HMS Surprise in convoy with Dryad, as he is not on the horizon, having spent time saving women stranded in a ship. In Treason's Harbour, he is in convoy on Dryad with HMS Surprise when they take a prize returning from the Adriatic Sea. In The Letter of Marque, he is made post Captain, and sails with Mrs Wray, whose husband has fled England.
- Barret Bonden is Aubrey's highly competent, highly valued coxswain. Bonden appears in the first book of the series, Master and Commander, as the coxswain and captain of the maintop in HM Sloop Sophie. He is described as "a fine open-looking creature, tough without brutality, cheerful, perfectly in his place and, of course, a prime seaman – bred to the sea from childhood." In this same novel, Aubrey asks Bonden to become a member of the quarterdeck, but Bonden declines, responding, "I ain't got the learning, sir." (p. 275). Nevertheless, Bonden's obvious abilities and trustworthiness enable Aubrey to entrust him with many missions of his own, several of which involve looking after Maturin during Maturin's activities as an intelligence agent. He appears in The Ionian Mission and Treason's Harbour. Bonden also proves to be valuable in always taking care to get the perpetually clumsy doctor safely on and off ship. Maturin returns the favor by teaching Bonden how to read and write. Bonden, along with his cousin, Joe Plaice, follows Aubrey from ship to ship. He was killed in an engagement with a xebec in The Hundred Days. In the 2003 film, Bonden was portrayed by Billy Boyd.
- "Awkward" Davies / Davis has long followed Aubrey from ship to ship. As his nickname suggests, he is a clumsy sailor, known for dropping sharp-edged tools from great heights, narrowly missing his shipmates. This, coupled with his immense strength and his hot temper, make him an undesirable crew mate. Despite this, he is valued as a powerful fighter useful for boarding and cutting-out expeditions. In The Ionian Mission and Treason's Harbour, he is called Davis, with the same description as Davies, and was saved from drowning just once. In Treason's Harbour (Chapter 7), in port at Suez, he negotiated with a bear leader to buy the cub, when "a fight broke out in the square below, a fight between Davis and the bear, which resented his familiarity in chucking it under the chin. ... Stephen hurried down to repair the bear," is one testimony to Davis's strength, and O'Brian's humour. Davies was played in the 2003 film by Patrick Gallagher. In the final Aubrey/Maturin adventure, Blue at the Mizzen, Aubrey describes Davies in a letter written to his wife Sophie:

"Your favourite Awkward Davies can be positively dogged, if crossed by a new hand: but in a boarding-party, or storming a shore-position, he is worth his weight in gold, heavy though he is. His huge bulk, his terrifying strength and activity, the awful pallor of his face and his way of foaming at the mouth when he is stirred, all make him a most dreadful opponent. What Stephen calls his berserker rage fairly clears the enemy's decks before him. He also howls. But he has other sides: not only is he very useful when you must sway up the mast short-handed, but in sudden emergencies too." (p. 98-99).

- Faster Doudle is a seaman often found in ships under Jack Aubrey's command, first named in HMS Surprise. In The Fortune of War he is described as the Leopard's wicket-keeper. He is mentioned once in Treason's Harbour, as he drops a sharp tool from the maintop, nearly injuring another crew man, on seeing the lovely Mrs Fielding aboard the ship. His last name is pronounced like the word "dawdle", punning on the ironic connection of the two words. In The Far Side of the World, his name is spelled both as Doudle and as Doodle. In the 2003 film, Doudle was portrayed by William Mannering.
- Lord Garron is the third lieutenant on HMS Lively in HMS Surprise. He is met again as captain of HMS Staunch in The Mauritius Command where he has inherited the title "Lord Narborough". In the 2003 film, the character of Midshipman Lord William Blakeney portrayed by Max Pirkis combines the non-noble midshipman William Blakeney from The Far Side of the World with Lord Garron, and is said to be his son.
- Preserved Killick is Aubrey's shrewish steward, inherited from Captain Allen when Aubrey assumes command of HM Sloop Sophie in Master and Commander. He also comes to unofficially care for Maturin (The Fortune of War, p. 57), particularly his long-suffering uniforms and clothes, and never resists the opportunity to nag either of them (though mostly Maturin, his habits generally leaving him looking much shabbier than Aubrey) for their carelessness in appearance. He is also known to listen in on their private conversations, steal from the captain's private stores, and drain more than his fair share of wine from the captain's table. Despite all these shortcomings, he is a highly valued, fiercely loyal and well-respected member of Aubrey's crew. Killick follows Aubrey from ship to ship. He is in The Ionian Mission. It is no surprise that larger dictionaries define killick as a small anchor. Killick's star does fade slightly in the nineteenth book, The Hundred Days, when an assistant at one of Aubrey's dinners "in a paroxysm of adolescent drunkenness, spewing improbable jets of Madeira," contrives to trip Killick and the poor steward cracks Stephen's sacrosanct narwhal horn (p. 89). Eventually, the horn, which the superstitious crew believes will bring good fortune to the ship, is restored, as is Killick's standing among his fellows. In the 2003 film, Killick was portrayed by actor David Threlfall.
- Nathaniel Martin is an Anglican priest whom Maturin meets as a parson, a thin and shabby literary gentleman in The Ionian Mission. He shares Maturin's love of nature and lack of maritime knowledge. Martin has an unfortunate tendency to buy his knowledge of living creatures at the expense of personal injury, including the loss of an eye to an owl, but his knowledge of anatomy and former experience in stuffing birds make him an obvious choice for surgeon's mate under Stephen. Martin first serves as assistant to Maturin in Treason's Harbour (Chapter 4), when Martin stays too long on the Dromedary inspecting Maturin's new diving bell, purchased to inspect the sea bottom. One notable show of his skills is when Martin sutures Maturin's long cut on the forehead; he is with the Surprises for the entire Red Sea mission, but not taken aboard the Surprise once she is repaired. He serves in this capacity through several novels. He is assistant surgeon on the Surprise sailing as a privateer in The Letter of Marque. Later, Martin serves as Surprise's surgeon during Stephen's absence (Thirteen-Gun Salute and The Nutmeg of Consolation). Sailors, who normally consider churchmen unlucky on board a ship, are often prepared to accept him in this medical capacity, further comforting themselves with the mistaken belief that he is only aboard because he was defrocked for having an affair with his Bishop's wife (from The Letter of Marque), though by that time he is a solid married man. At first meeting, Martin is a young man (younger than Stephen) who is eager to please and to be pleased; these qualities, along with his interest in nature, slowly fade with time. Martin's career at sea ends in The Wine Dark Sea when he becomes too ill to sail after treating himself with strong medicines he did not need, mistaking salt sores for the pox, in guilt for his thoughts, not actions towards Clarissa Oakes on the previous voyage. His love of botanizing returns as Maturin begins treatment to restore him. Surprise arrives at Callao, a port in Peru, before Martin is recovered, and Maturin has work to do ashore in Peru. Martin heads home with Dr Geary on a merchantman, Three Graces. Aubrey has given two livings on his holdings to Martin.
- William Mowett – Originally a master's mate in HM Sloop Sophie, he became one of Aubrey's junior lieutenants in the Surprise in The Ionian Mission, and then first lieutenant once Pullings is promoted, in Treason's Harbour. Mowett is injured aboard the Peacock as part of the War of 1812; the news that he is recovering in a New York hospital reaches Aubrey via the American Captain Lawrence (captain of the USS Hornet when he meets Mowett) as Aubrey is recovering in a hospital in Boston, both prisoners of war, in The Fortune of War. Mowett and another lieutenant, Rowan, who joins the Worcester in The Ionian Mission and remains on Surprise as first lieutenant in Treason's Harbour, are amateur poets of indifferent talent, who try to outdo each other in declaiming bombastic poetry, one in "the classical style" and another in "the modern style" – their poems all having to do with shipwrecks, lee shores and naval battles. He is aboard HMS Tartarus under Babbington en route to his position as first lieutenant on HMS Illustrious, and still waiting for his book of poems to be published. In the 2003 film, Mowett was played by Edward Woodall.
- Padeen (Patrick Colman) is Maturin's longtime servant and loblolly boy. Only Maturin is able to communicate with him, as Padeen has a cleft palate and can speak only in the Irish tongue. He becomes addicted to opium after he is anaesthetized with laudanum following a shipboard accident in The Letter of Marque, and found out by Martin. He breaks into an apothecary shop to steal some. He is caught and transported to New South Wales, but later pardoned. His patient, gentle nature is instrumental in bringing Brigid, Maturin's disabled (possibly autistic) daughter, out of her shell. In the 2003 film, Padeen was played by John DeSantis.
- Joseph "Joe" Plaice is an able seaman and long-time follower of Aubrey, described as "deeply stupid" but an excellent hand in Post Captain. He is Barret Bonden's cousin. The medical procedure to relieve pressure on the brain, leaving a flattened coin in place of the bone removed is performed by Maturin upon both Plaice (in The Far Side of the World) and Mr Day, the gunner of HM Sloop Sophie (in Master and Commander), among others. He is aboard HMS Worcester and HMS Surprise in The Ionian Mission. Like Awkward Davies/Davis, Plaice is a character whose name seems to change over time: in Treason's Harbour, for example, Stephen Maturin refers to "William Plaice," a shipmate whom O'Brian had earlier described as "an elderly forecastle hand"—the same terminology he has used in other contexts to describe Joe Plaice; either a manuscript error or Maturin making a rare error in the name of someone he knows. Plaice is part of the crew on HMS Surprise in The Far Side of the World and in The Letter of Marque on the private ship Surprise when they take the French frigate Diane. He was played in the 2003 film by George Innes. In the film, Stephen Maturin saves his life by performing brain surgery after he sustains a depressed skull fracture.
- Thomas Pullings is a long-time officer under Aubrey, serving under him as a master's mate in his first command HM Sloop Sophie. He is the first lieutenant of HMS Worcester in The Ionian Mission. He is promoted to commander in Treason's Harbour and post captain for his bravery in various shipboard actions led by Aubrey. His face is scarred by a Turkish saber cut, taken in The Ionian Mission, giving his easy-going look a mark of the fierce fighter he is. When Aubrey has no ship, Pullings once transfers to the British East India Company and commands transport ships (so that he is attached to the British government's Transport Board, though still retaining his nominal rank in the navy). As commander, he has difficulty getting his own ship in the Royal Navy. He later rejoins the navy, regularly serving as a volunteer aboard Aubrey's ships. When HMS Surprise is sold out of the service, Pullings assists newly wealthy Maturin in making the successful bid and in securing the ship once he owns it. When Aubrey is dismissed from the Navy after a false accusation of stock fraud, Pullings, who remains on "half pay" (Royal Navy officers get full pay only when they are posted to a ship), again ships as a volunteer on the Surprise in its new character as a letter of marque, serving as captain when Aubrey is on another ship, or as first officer when Aubrey is aboard. In The Wine Dark Sea, he plays both roles in alternation, as Surprise takes the privateer Franklin, which Pullings then commands until they reach port in Peru, when Pullings takes Surprise while Aubrey stays aboard the Franklin until it is time to sell her. He is Captain of HMS Bellona when Aubrey is The Commodore. Pullings is married and has several children, on land. When Aubrey is made a commodore, Pullings serves as his Flag-Captain. In the 2003 film, Pullings was portrayed by James D'Arcy.
- William Reade is first seen as a midshipman in The Thirteen Gun Salute, though he is eventually promoted to master's mate. In the events described in The Nutmeg of Consolation, he loses his entire arm due to injuries sustained in battle (p. 45). He adapts well to his limitation, and when young boys are again aboard the Surprise in The Wine Dark Sea, he takes to skylarking again. He is 14 years old then, and is sent to take the prize Franklin after the underwater volcano erupts in the Pacific Ocean. This injury does not impair his abilities as a sailor or an officer; as a master's mate, he captains Aubrey's private tender, a fast Baltimore Clipper called the Ringle. Reade fills a vacancy that develops as Pullings, Babbington and Mowett mature, embark on independent naval careers, and start their own families, in that Reade is an eager young man (initially a boy of the status "squeaker" or first voyager) to whom Aubrey, and to a lesser extent Maturin serve as mentors.

=== Other recurring characters ===
- Sir Joseph Blaine is Maturin's superior in British Naval Intelligence. He is a keen naturalist and, like Maturin, a fellow of the Royal Society, with a particular interest in beetles. The fictional character of Sir Joseph Blaine is to some degree based on the real life Sir Joseph Banks, who nevertheless also makes brief appearances in the series. He is described briefly in a wiki about the Aubrey-Maturin series. An essay about the actual historical context of British intelligence at the time in relation to the O'Brian novels, in the form of a review by an authoritative reviewer (former Director of US Naval Intelligence). of "Most Secret and Confidential: Intelligence in the Age of Nelson," by Steven E. Maffeo. Annapolis: Naval Institute Press, 2000, 355 pages. The review reveals a different organization of intelligence collection than depicted, though agrees it occurred. Blaine and Maturin grow to be close friends as well as colleagues by The Reverse of the Medal, when Maturin's usual haunt, The Grapes is burnt and not yet rebuilt, and he stays in his club, which is also Blaine's club, Blacks. Blaine gives accurate readings of how government is acting in the trial, which guides Maturin's actions to help his particular friend, Jack Aubrey through the ordeal. Blaine instructs Maturin on the powers he will need as the owner of the privateer Surprise, especially when she is sailed on a mission that may benefit government. Despite strong efforts, the spies Ledward and Wray slip through Blaine's hands out of England, it is learned in The Letter of Marque.
- Mrs Broad is the owner and keeper of The Grapes, a comfortable inn in the Liberties of the Savoy, where Stephen often stays when in London after finding it in Post Captain as a refuge from debt collectors for Aubrey. Mrs. Broad looks after Stephen as best as she can, and tolerates his habitual untidiness, and his habit of dissecting dead animals and human corpses in the inn premises. She has a niece, Lucy (who in The Surgeons Mate addresses her as "Aunt Broad"), who assists her in running The Grapes. She appears in The Ionian Mission, when Villiers and Maturin realize a good marriage for them means separate homes, and Maturin settles again into The Grapes. In The Reverse of the Medal, her inn has burned to the ground and is not yet rebuilt, so Maturin stays in his club, Blacks. In The Letter of Marque, The Grapes is nearly rebuilt, and Mrs. Broad is again watching over Maturin. At the start of The Commodore, Maturin brings Sarah and Emily Sweetings to Mrs Broad, in hopes they will learn useful social ways in England, as they cannot sail in the squadron.
- Capitaine de Vaisseau Christy-Pallière – Introduced in Master and Commander, he is a gallant French post captain with English cousins, who speaks fluent English that is slightly quaint from his habit of mangling quotations – "Let us gather rose pods while we may" as he says, for "Gather ye rosebuds while ye may". Aubrey surrenders to him after HMS Sophie is taken, but Christy-Pallière, impressed with the resistance of the Sophie, refuses to take his sword and insists that he continue to wear it. He is apparently promoted to admiral, as we hear from his nephew Lt. Dumesnil (affectionately called Pierrot), lieutenant of the French frigate Cornélie in The Thirteen Gun Salute. When he appears again in The Hundred Days, he is again a post captain, who renounces Napoleon, declares his loyalty for King Louis XVIII and places his frigate at the disposal of the Royal Navy.
- Heneage Dundas is a friend and former shipmate of Aubrey. He is a fellow post-captain, the son of one First Lord of the Admiralty and the brother of a later First Lord. Although the basic facts of his name and relationship are based on the actual individual, most of the actions and events he participates in during the books are fictional.
- Professor Ebenezer Graham is a professor of Oriental languages, sent as an envoy to the Ottoman Empire navy on HMS Worcester in The Ionian Mission. He is stereotypical Scotsman: dour, humorless, and speaking with a broad Scots burr. He is also an inept secret agent, working for a branch of British intelligence service that is in conflict with Maturin's branch. Landing on the French coast on a secret mission, he literally shoots himself in the foot by accident, so that Maturin, on a secret mission of his own aborted by Graham's presence, takes Graham as his prize and puts him to work for the Commander-in-Chief of the Mediterranean Fleet. Graham gains crucial information in The Ionian Mission by dint of his long connections with the Turks, and remains with Maturin on Malta in Treason's Harbour, describing one of the French spies on the island, Lesueur, becoming useful with more than his language skills. Graham does not enjoy Maturin's dry humor and nor Aubrey's high spirits and humor before battle, but comes to enjoy Maturin's company. When the new Commander-in-Chief arrives with his own Turkish consultant, Graham is sent home on short notice.
- The Duke of Habachtsthal is a minor royal, a German nobleman and distant relation of the King, who is the homosexual lover of Wray and Ledward. After their death, he continues to pass secrets on to France, while trying to get Sir Joseph Blaine into trouble, and also trying to get Maturin arrested for his mostly forgotten fringe role in the Irish rebellion of 1798, as well as for illegally bringing Padeen and Clarissa, both transported convicts, over from Australia. To keep his daughter, Mrs Oakes and Padeen safe from him, Maturin sets them up in a convent in Avila, Spain. He is said to have cut his throat (in The Commodore), possibly due to the threat of trial for treason after being identified by Clarissa Oakes and following extensive investigation carried out by Mr Pratt, a former Bow Street Runner employed by Maturin and Sir Joseph Blaine. His death merits flags at half-staff, in full irony.
- Captain (later Admiral) Harte is Aubrey's nemesis. His hatred of Aubrey stems from Aubrey's cuckolding him in Master and Commander. While never calling Jack out, he nevertheless tries to foil Aubrey's professional advancement whenever possible unless he can personally profit from it, as when Aubrey is placed under his command in Post Captain, even though Aubrey fails to bring in many prizes. Harte is especially angry about this because he did not profit from the Sophie's many prizes in Master and Commander. Harte is described as a little man, somewhat resembling Lord St. Vincent in appearance but not in character. He is killed in Treason's Harbour when his secret orders are compromised by Andrew Wray and his ship is destroyed in battle.
- Fanny Harte is the daughter of Admiral and Molly Harte. Her father marries her off to Andrew Wray, when she is in love with Babbington, as is learned in The Ionian Mission. Babbington eventually wins her.
- Molly Harte is Captain Harte's wife, with whom Aubrey has an affair in Port Mahon as a lieutenant and commander, in Master and Commander.
- Amos Jacob is a Jewish physician, intelligence-agent and naturalist who appears first in The Hundred Days. He is close friends with Maturin, and it is clear that they knew each other long before Dr. Jacob was introduced in the series. As Maturin's assistant surgeon and fellow naturalist, he plays a similar role to Martin, though as a physician he is much more medically competent and he often assists Maturin in his covert activities, using his previous profession as a jewel merchant as a cover. He is well liked by the hands of the Surprise both for his medical talent and for bringing Maturin a preserved hand, a specimen of Dupuytren's contracture, which the crew suppose is a Hand of Glory which will bring them luck.
- Gedymin Jagiello is a Lithuanian officer in the Swedish army, later attached to the embassy in London. He is described as a beautiful, blonde-haired young man, perpetually unaware of his effect on the fair sex. He meets Aubrey and Maturin as part of a mission to the Baltic in The Surgeon's Mate, and is with them throughout their shipwreck, imprisonment in Paris and subsequent escape. Maturin receives letters from an anonymous source that suggested Jagiello was having an affair with Diana, but they were likely sent by French agents attempting to compromise Maturin. When Diana leaves Maturin and flees to Sweden in The Reverse of the Medal, she lives under Jagiello's protection; however, in The Letter of Marque it is revealed that theirs is not a sexual relationship, and that she has helped arrange Jagiello's own forthcoming marriage.
- Harry Johnson is a wealthy American slave-owner of Maryland who is also active in the new US government as an intelligence agent and spymaster in Boston during the War of 1812. He is first met in Alipur, India pursuing Diana Villiers in HMS Surprise. He then becomes Diana Villiers's lover, until she could not bear his brutality or expectation that she would aid him in his spy work against Britain in The Fortune of War. Diana became pregnant with his child, but suffered a miscarriage in Surgeon's Mate. Johnson's cultured exterior hides a brutal nature. Diana fled with Maturin in The Fortune of War. Johnson doggedly pursues Maturin across the Atlantic, and identifying betrays Maturin to the French.
- Lord Keith is an admiral in the Royal Navy. He makes Aubrey his protégé from the earliest stages of his career and assists him at various points in the series. When the series opens with Master and Commander, Lord Keith is married to Queenie, Jack's childhood tutor and friend. Jack suspects that her influence gained him his step to master and commander in Minorca.
- Edward Ledward – Homosexual lover of Andrew Wray, an official in the British Treasury department, and a French spy who is eventually discovered and forced to flee to France. He had been to Malaya in his youth and is fluent in the Malay language and with Malay court etiquette, so that he serves as the French envoy's official interpreter in The Thirteen Gun Salute. When the French mission fails, Maturin dissects Ledward and Wray after having possibly shot them himself.
- Admiral Linois is a French admiral whom Jack Aubrey first encounters in Master and Commander when the Sophie is taken by his squadron in the Mediterranean. Later, after Aubrey has been paroled, Linois and his ships are involved in Sir James Saumarez's battle against a combined French and Spanish fleet in the Gut of Gibraltar. In HMS Surprise Jack, with the assistance of a fleet of armed merchant ships belonging to the British East India Company, fights against Linois' squadron, taking the Surprise into a yardarm to yardarm battle (a cannon duel at almost touching range) against Linois' 74 gun ship of the line, the Marengo.
- Clarissa Oakes is the eponymous character in the novel Clarissa Oakes (published as The Truelove in the US). Her early life was very difficult; she was sexually abused as a child, then left penniless after the death of her guardian. She took a job as a book-keeper in a brothel, where she was occasionally forced to work as a prostitute. These experiences left her with no emotional attachment to the act of love-making. She was sentenced to death for killing a man (she blew off his head with a fowling piece), but the sentence was commuted to transport to Sydney, New South Wales. When the Surprise leaves Sydney, Jack discovers that midshipman Oakes has smuggled the convict on board. Jack quickly marries the two off in order to prevent problems with the authorities. Clarissa's presence causes friction among the crew, as she is somewhat free with her "favors" until Maturin convinces her to be faithful to her husband. Clarissa is able to provide Maturin with information that uncovers the source of intelligence leaks inside the British government. Stephen is able to set up Clarissa on his estate in England, where she resides after her husband's death at sea. Clarissa later acts as Stephen's daughter's guardian after Diana leaves home, unable to deal with Brigid's autism (in The Commodore). In Blue at the Mizzen she marries a scholarly clergyman.
- Queenie or Queeney is a childhood friend of Jack Aubrey, about ten years older than he is, who is introduced in Master and Commander. Daughter of a neighbouring family, she became a mother figure to Jack after his own mother died, and also tutored him in mathematics (she is a scholar, mathematician and linguist). She later marries Lord Keith as his second wife in 1800. Queenie is a real person, actually married to Lord Keith in 1808; her true name is Hester Maria Thrale, but she is spoken of as "Queeney" in Boswell's Life of Johnson and Mme. D'Arblay's Diary.
- Dr. Ramis is a French officer and ship's surgeon under Capitan de Vaisseau Christy-Palliêre. He is a friend of Maturin, as well as an agent for the British, assisting Maturin with Catalan affairs.
- Sarah and Emily Sweeting are first seen on their small Pacific island in The Nutmeg of Consolation, where they are the sole survivors of a smallpox epidemic which has killed the other inhabitants. Stephen Maturin rescues them and brings them aboard the ship. Initially Sarah and Emily speak no English, but they soon master both styles spoken in the ship, quarterdeck and below-decks varieties (the latter including oaths and swearing). After they rebel against his attempt to place them in an Australian orphanage, they sail half-way around the world. Upon reaching England, he asks the landlady of his London inn, The Grapes in Savoy, to take them in, at the start of The Commodore. They reappear in subsequent books, developing into fine helpers to Mrs. Broad, the landlady, especially as market shoppers and cooks.
- Amanda Smith: Aubrey's affair with Smith occurs during his brief stay in Halifax (The Surgeon's Mate). Even before he has left Halifax, he regrets this affair, but when her love letters, including notice of a coming child, follow him to England, Aubrey begins to worry that the obsessed Smith might follow him herself. Eventually, Smith marries someone else, and her pregnancy appears to be imagined or simply used as a threat to him. Many years later her letters to Jack are discovered by Mrs. Williams, who shows them to Sophie, providing her with proof of Jack's infidelity.
- Christine Wood, née Hatherleigh, is the wife (later widow) of Governor Wood of Sierra Leone. She is a sister of Maturin's Royal Society colleague Edward Hatherleigh. Maturin finds her to be, like himself, a competent amateur naturalist and anatomist, and soon falls in love with her, after Diana's death. In 21, he finds himself fighting a duel with a rival suitor of hers.
- Andrew Wray – He is first met playing, and cheating at, cards with Aubrey in Desolation Island; his cheating is challenged by Aubrey publicly, but no duel ensues. Later, he is the son-in-law of Admiral Harte, as well as Second Secretary at the Admiralty. He has a poisonous hatred for Jack Aubrey and works silently to blight his career. He is responsible for causing dissension between Maturin and Diana by not passing on his letters to her. He is a double agent working for the French, shown in Treason's Harbour, who passes naval secrets to French intelligence, which pays him generously. He is reluctant to cover his gambling debts on his own funds, asking the French to pass him more money. When his wife Fanny Harte inherits, he will be very wealthy. Her father arranged the marriage in The Ionian Mission and they are married by the start of the next novel, Treason's Harbour. But Admiral Harte tied the money to his daughter and her children; when he dies in Treason's Harbour, Wray is no better off financially. Wray makes much trouble for the British cause, for the London stock exchange (The Reverse of the Medal) to gain money to pay his debts, and for Aubrey and Maturin, as a shadowy opponent. Wray's dual role is discovered in The Reverse of the Medal and he flees for France in The Letter of Marque, leaving behind proof of his role in manipulating the stock exchange and setting up Aubrey for the blame. He has a homosexual lover, Edward Ledward, another highly placed official in the British Treasury, who is also a spy for France and flees with him when they are exposed by Duhamel. In The Thirteen Gun Salute, Wray and Ledward are part of a French diplomatic mission to Malaya competing for the Malay court's allegiance against a British contingent which includes Aubrey and Maturin. When the French mission fails, Maturin dissects Ledward and Wray after having possibly shot them himself.

== Sources for novel characters and those in the film adaptation ==
Brown, Anthony Gary (2006). The Patrick O'Brian Muster Book: Persons, Animals, Ships and Cannon in the Aubrey-Maturin Sea Novels (2nd ed.). McFarland & Company. ISBN 0-7864-2482-6.

Full cast and crew of Master and Commander: The Far Side of the World at IMDb
