= Horizon tank =

Water tank that gives the illusion of the ocean's horizon

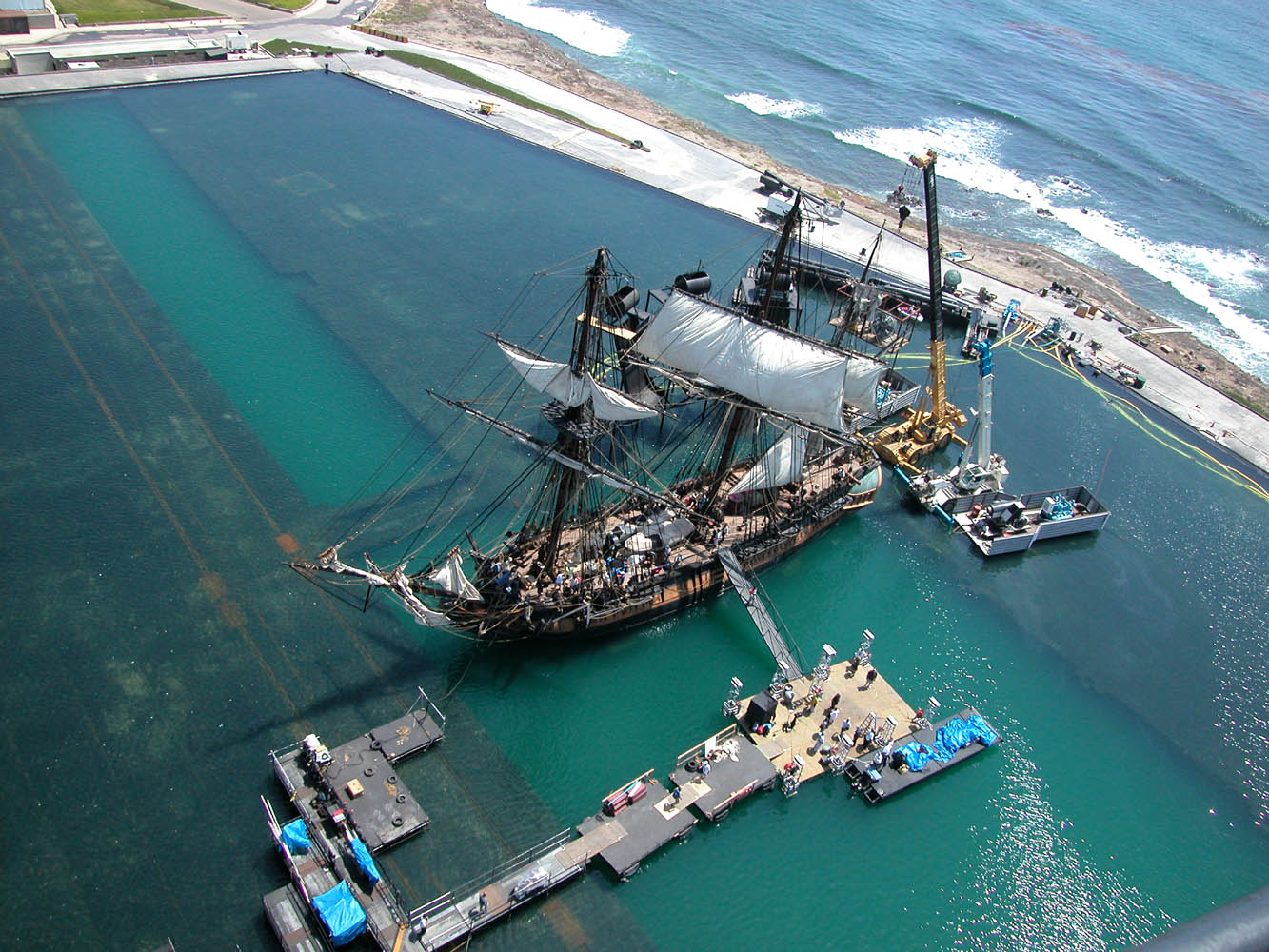
Filming of Master and Commander: The Far Side of the World in 2003 at Baja Studios

A horizon tank is a large water tank built on the coast and used in filmmaking. It allows filmmakers to film an ocean horizon without having to be in the middle of the ocean.

== History ==
The first horizon tank was constructed in Malta in 1964 by special effects technician Benjamin Hole, who later formed Mediterranean Film Studios. Popular films shot there include U-571 and Ridley Scott's White Squall. The studio's tanks are also regularly used for filming TV commercials.

In 1996 20th Century Fox acquired 40 acres of waterfront south of Playas de Rosarito in Baja California, Mexico, and built a 17-million-gallon tank for the film Titanic, a co-production with Paramount Pictures. The tank held a replica of the ship, and provided 270 degrees of ocean view.

== List of horizon tanks ==
There are only a few horizon tanks worldwide:

- (Mediterranean Film Studios) Malta Film Studios in Malta
- Baja Studios in Playas de Rosarito, Baja California, Mexico
- Point Cook RAAF Base in Victoria, Australia
- Lantica Studios Horizon Water Tank in Juan Dolio, Dominican Republic

== See also ==
- Infinity edge pool - the same concept for leisure use
