= Stephen Maturin =

Fictional character in the Aubrey-Maturin series of novels by Patrick O'Brian

- First appearance: Master and Commander
- Last appearance: The Final Unfinished Voyage of Jack Aubrey
- Created by: Patrick O'Brian
- Portrayed by: Paul Bettany (film); Nigel Anthony (BBC Radio); Richard Dillane (BBC Radio)

In-universe information
- Aliases: Don Esteban Maturin y Domanova, Etienne Domanova
- Gender: Male
- Title: Doctor
- Occupation: Doctor/ Ship's surgeon/ Intelligence agent/Naturalist
- Spouse: Diana Villiers
- Children: Brigid Maturin
- Relatives: Several

Stephen Maturin FRS (/ˈmætjʊrɪn/) is a fictional character in the Aubrey–Maturin series of novels by Patrick O'Brian. The series portrays his career as a physician, naturalist and spy in the Royal Navy during the Napoleonic Wars, and the long pursuit of his beloved Diana Villiers.

Maturin was played by Paul Bettany in the 2003 film Master and Commander: The Far Side of the World and by Nigel Anthony and Richard Dillane in the BBC Radio 4 adaptations of O'Brian's novels. Bettany was nominated for a British Academy Film Award for his performance.

== Biography ==
=== Early life ===
Stephen Maturin, called by his Catalan family Esteban Maturin y Domanova, a Roman Catholic, is the illegitimate son of an Irish officer serving in the Spanish Army and a Catalonian lady. He is cousin to the historical Lord Edward FitzGerald, which would make his father a brother to the 1st Duke of Leinster. As a boy he lived in Ireland, fostered by a family of pig-herders in Cahersiveen and County Clare, and spent his teenage years in Catalonia – most notably with his grandmother in Lleida, his uncle in Barcelona and his godfather in Ullastret. He received a largely Benedictine education, focusing on the Classics (he speaks Ancient Greek and Latin fluently, and can recite the Aeneid). He returned to Ireland in his adolescence, undertook premedical studies at Trinity College Dublin, and received further training in Paris, conceding to have "dissected with Dupuytren" while there.

He was in Paris during the outbreak of the French Revolution in 1789, of which he was at first an ardent supporter. Returning to Ireland he was a member of the United Irishmen. While in Ireland he became engaged to a woman called Mona, who died in unspecified circumstances. He had become disabused of political enthusiasms and was against the 1798 rebellion, in which he refused to take part.

=== Naval career ===
Master and Commander, the first book in the series, opens in 1800. Maturin has travelled to Minorca with a patient who died there, leaving him penniless and stranded. A chance meeting with Jack Aubrey at a musical performance in the governor's house at Port Mahon did not go well, as Aubrey was despondent about his seemingly stalled naval career and Maturin was frustrated by his own situation, leading to some harsh words. However, Aubrey received a promotion later that evening and was in a much better mood when he ran across Maturin again the next day, leading to a fast friendship and an offer to be the ship's surgeon aboard Aubrey's first command, HMS Sophie, a fictional brig-rigged sloop-of-war. Being that ships' surgeons in that era usually received very limited training or advanced education, the officers and crew of the Sophie are very pleased to have a true physician on board. Their esteem for Maturin's medical skill increases early on when he successfully performs delicate surgery on deck, repairing a crew member's serious head injury by removing a damaged portion of his skull and replacing it with a silver coin hammered into a dome by the armourer. The feat is witnessed by most of the crew, and they mention it several times in subsequent books in the series.

As a passionate advocate of Catalan independence and a resolute opponent of Bonaparte's tyranny, Maturin had become involved in intelligence gathering, and as he begins his career with the Royal Navy, he becomes a valued volunteer secret agent for the Admiralty. His political and intelligence missions are of such vital importance that Jack Aubrey is often sent to far-flung corners of the world primarily to discreetly allow his apparent ship's surgeon to perform a task for the British government. His work put him in some difficult and dangerous situations, particularly when he was captured and tortured in Port Mahon in HMS Surprise, the third novel in the series. While being held by French intelligence agents, Maturin was subjected to the rack (among other implements), making him a temporary invalid and permanently damaging his hands. Aubrey leads a cutting-out mission to save his friend, who spends the next few months recuperating. The extent of the torture is revealed slowly across the novels following it.

In 1802, Maturin meets and falls in love with Diana Villiers while he and Aubrey are renting a small estate along with several crewmates during the Peace of Amiens. Diana's cousin, Sophia Williams, becomes close friends with Maturin and eventually marries Aubrey. Sophie encourages Diana and (particularly) Stephen to express their feelings towards each other. However, Maturin does not risk a rejection, and Diana leaves on the first of what becomes a series of affairs that take her around the world, leading to a years-long and extremely frustrating pursuit by Maturin. He saves her from her American "protector" in Boston in 1812, killing two French agents in the process. He finally proposes marriage, but Diana is still hesitant. They eventually do marry in 1813 after she trades her most valuable diamond in exchange for his freedom from a French prison. They have a daughter, Brigid, who shows signs of being autistic before seemingly overcoming her issues. Diana dies in a coach accident in 1815 before the opening of The Hundred Days. Maturin is despondent, but later strikes up a relationship with fellow naturalist Christine Hatherleigh Wood and proposes marriage relatively quickly. She turns him down because she is disillusioned with marriage due to a poor relationship with her first husband. However, they remain close friends, and she becomes close to the Aubrey family and Maturin's daughter Brigid after spending time with them at the Aubrey estate. In the unfinished last novel, their relationship is unresolved.

== Personal characteristics ==
Stephen Maturin is described as short, slight, and dark-haired, with "curious" pale blue eyes and pale skin if not exposed to the sun. He does become fairly dark-skinned when he travels to tropical climes, a result of his Hiberno-Spanish heritage and predilection for naked sun-bathing. He weighs "barely 9 stone" (126 pounds, 56 kg). A French spy who saw him in Brazil as a prisoner on the USS Constitution, after HMS Java rescued them from the tropical seas, wrote that Maturin was "Five foot six, slight build, black hair, pale eyes, muddy complexion, three nails on the right hand torn out, both hands somewhat crippled: speaks perfect French with a southern accent". (quoted in The Surgeon's Mate Chapter 11). Maturin is fluent in Catalan, English, French, Irish, Latin and Spanish, and on his travels, he develops a working knowledge of Greek, Malay, Arabic and Urdu. In the 2003 film, he is also briefly shown speaking basic Portuguese. Although a skilled linguist, Maturin never quite grasps naval jargon or the workings of a ship, a narrative ploy which allows the author to provide the reader with technical information by having helpful crewmates explain things to the ship's doctor.

Maturin is habitually untidy or even disreputable in appearance; he spends as little as possible on clothes, preferring an "old rusty coat" unless the occasion calls for dressier clothes. As a physician, he often wears an old periwig over his sparse close-cropped hair. His frugal personal habits persist despite a considerable share of prize money earned over the years, and a fortune inherited from his Catalan godfather in The Reverse of the Medal. He uses part of his fortune to buy the recently decommissioned HMS Surprise, giving its command to Jack Aubrey when he had been framed for stock manipulation and temporarily lost his commission. Surprise is employed as a letter of marque, and later as His Majesty's Hired Vessel when Aubrey is restored to the Navy List.

As well as his activities as a physician and agent, Maturin is a celebrated natural philosopher in the age of scientific discovery. He is, like Aubrey, a member of the Royal Society. His interests are wide, but he has a particular interest in wildlife, particularly birds and their anatomy. He discovers and names the hitherto unknown species of giant tortoise Testudo aubreii on a remote and uninhabited island in the Indian Ocean. An unending frustration for him is to be pulled away from the flora and fauna never before seen by a scientific eye, for the naval mission on which the ship travels. This is most poignant when he and his assistant Martin are promised time to explore and collect samples in the Galapagos Islands, which permission is abruptly rescinded when HMS Surprise must sail immediately on information as to where USS Norfolk can be found, the target of Aubrey's mission in The Far Side of the World. He is considered an expert in suprapubic cystostomy (spelled "cystotomy", without the "s").

Dr. Maturin is prone to self-medication. While pining over Diana, he becomes addicted to opium in the form of a tincture of laudanum. In The Letter of Marque he states his own "moderate dose" is "a thousand drops", when twenty-five drops is a usual dose for a man in pain; in Desolation Island it is implied that he daily takes eighteen thousand drops. Later, he switches to coca leaves, and is a frequent user of khat and tobacco and a devotee of particularly strong coffee with his breakfast.

Maturin is an excellent observer of people, a skill useful in his profession of physician and in his work in naval intelligence. He has a wide network of friends, relatives, fellow students, fellow natural philosophers and, over time, those who work in intelligence. He loves playing and listening to music, and whenever possible, he enjoys duets on cello with Aubrey on violin.

== Film treatment of Maturin ==
In reviewing the film made from the series of books, Christopher Hitchens finds "the summa of O'Brian's genius was the invention of Dr. Stephen Maturin. He is the ship's gifted surgeon, but he is also a scientist, an espionage agent for the Admiralty, a man of part Irish and part Catalan birth—and a revolutionary. He joins the British side, having earlier fought against it, because of his hatred for Bonaparte's betrayal of the principles of 1789—principles that are perfectly obscure to bluff Capt. Jack Aubrey. Any cinematic adaptation of O'Brian must stand or fall by its success in representing this figure. On this the film doesn't even fall, let alone stand. It skips the whole project." He finds the film's action scenes more inspirational: "In one respect the action lives up to its fictional and actual inspiration. This was the age of Bligh and Cook and of voyages of discovery as well as conquest, and when HMS Surprise makes landfall in the Galapagos Islands we get a beautifully filmed sequence about how the dawn of scientific enlightenment might have felt."

== Bibliography ==
- Brown, Anthony Gary (2006). The Patrick O'Brian Muster Book: Persons, Animals, Ships and Cannon in the Aubrey-Maturin Sea Novels (2nd ed.). McFarland & Company. ISBN 978-0-7864-2482-5.
- King, Dean (1995). A Sea of Words: A Lexicon and Companion to the Complete Seafaring Tales of Patrick O'Brian (1st ed.). Henry Holt and Company. ISBN 978-0-8050-3816-3.
