= Baja Studios =

Mexican film studio

Coordinates: 32.286°N 117.036°W

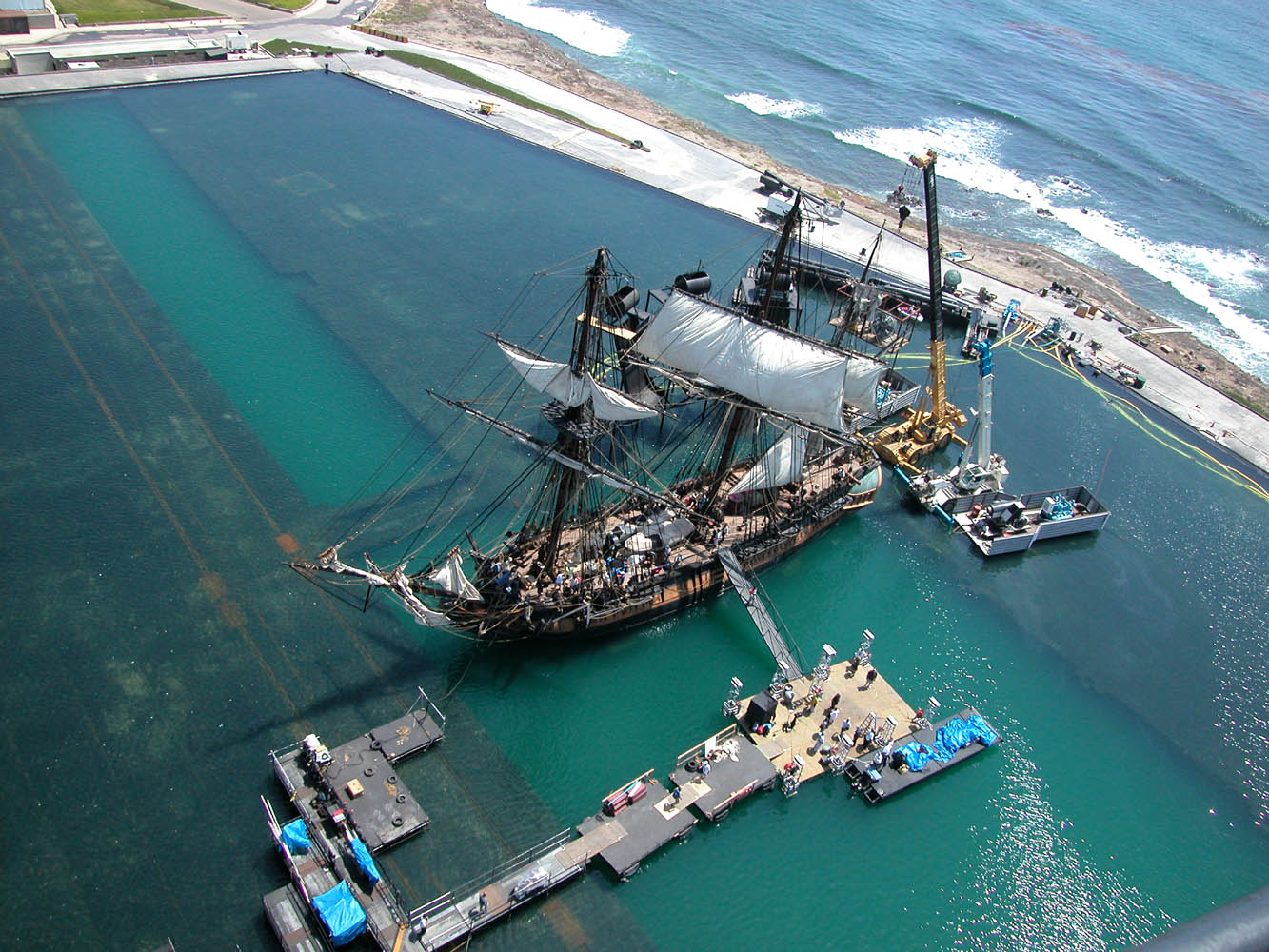
- Filming of Master and Commander: The Far Side of the World in 2003
- Formerly: Fox Studios Baja (1996–2007)
- Traded as: Baja Studios
- Founded: 1996; 30 years ago
- Headquarters: Rosarito, Baja California, Mexico
- Area served: Worldwide
- Products: Filming Studios, filming stages, filming tanks, productions, major filming studios, movie productions, box office
- Owner: José Galicot

Baja Studios is a Mexican film studio near the resort community of Rosarito, Baja California, Mexico, owned by José Galicot. It comprises the world's largest stages and water tanks designed for filming. As well as major film work, the facility is used for making commercials, music videos, television series, and movies for television.

Originally built by Mexican businessman José Galicot and 20th Century Fox for the reconstruction of RMS Titanic in the 1997 film Titanic, it has since then built some of the largest sets for numerous other films, including MGM's Tomorrow Never Dies, Amblin Entertainment's In Dreams, Warner Bros.'s Deep Blue Sea, Phoenix Pictures's The Weight of Water, Disney's Pearl Harbor and Fox's Master and Commander: The Far Side of the World.

== History ==
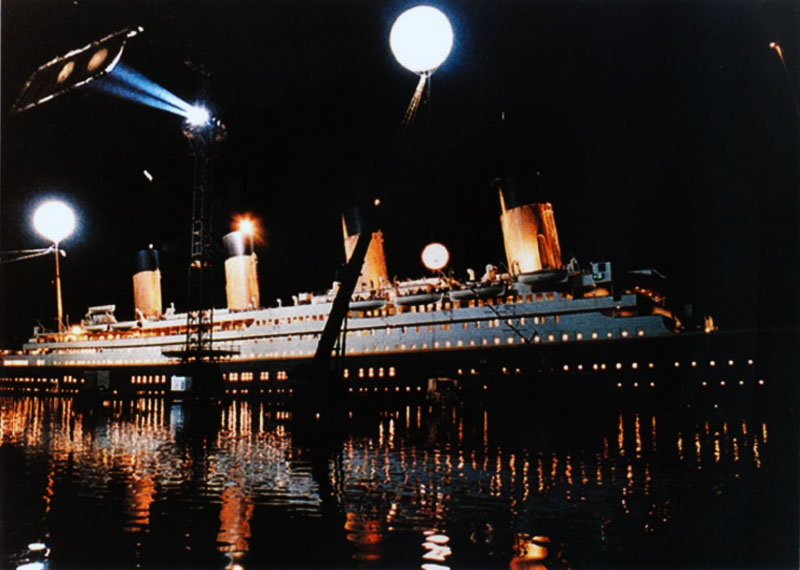
The filming of Titanic in 1997

Baja Studios began life as a Mexican subsidiary of 20th Century Fox, a part of the global corporate holdings of Rupert Murdoch on land leased by the Hollywood studio. Specializing in the production of Mexican films, co-productions between the United States and Mexico, as well as exclusive productions by American companies that rented the facilities to film underwater scenes. Construction of the facility costing an estimated $20 million USD began on 6 June 1996 next to the northern edge of a small fishing village (Puerto Popotla). Construction lasted 100 days. The corporation had an interest in breaking the power in Hollywood of the Teamsters Union; the corporation had learned from the Wapping dispute. The studio's design was heavily influenced by the production needs of the first film to be shot there, James Cameron's epic Titanic, where there was a requirement to shoot a 775-foot-long (236 m) replica of the ship in a water tank.

Fox sold the studios in May 2007 to Baja Acquisitions (a consortium of "local financial interests") for an eight-figure US dollar sum.

There was a downturn in the area from 2007 when tourism lessened due to a local drug war and a tightening of travel restrictions. Popotla had become attractive to smugglers of illegal immigrants at night once the restaurant trade had closed for the day.

In 2018 a resurgence in filmmaking for Internet streaming by Amazon, HBO, and Netflix lifted prospects for the studio.

== Facilities ==
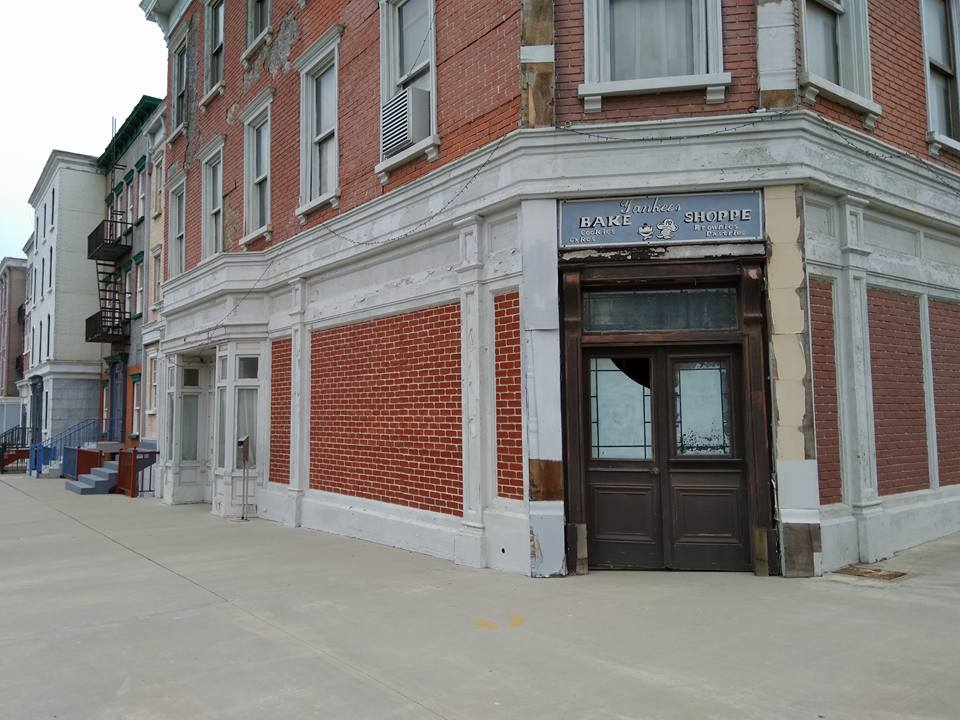
Film set at Baja Studios

The studio is built alongside the ocean coastline, enabling an unobstructed view of the sea. It comprises 35 acres (14 ha) of land overlooking the Pacific Ocean, with 2,000 feet (610 m) of coastline frontage. The facility has 5 stages, 4 indoor and outdoor water tanks, street sets, and is a self-contained facility, with offices, scenery shops, wardrobe and dressing rooms. Two of the stages and three of the tanks are combined. There are four tanks with a combined volume of over 20 million gallons fed by a filtration seawater plant capable of delivering 9,000 gallons of water per minute.

Tank 1 is an infinite horizon pond which adjoins and overlooks the Pacific. Built to film Titanic, it is a 360,000 square feet (33,000 m^{2}) concrete pool with a full capacity of 17 million gallons, used for exterior shooting, wet or dry, and consists of three depth levels from 3 1/2 to 40 feet (1.1 to 12.2 m). The tank can be emptied or filled in 40 hours. Alongside it is a 162 foot (49 metres) motor-driven tower crane, used for constructing film sets and as a lighting and camera platform. Fox employed mostly American technical personnel for the tank's construction, despite available Mexican resources. On completion of filming, the tank was drained of chlorinated water too quickly without management in one batch, ruining the fishing waters at Popotla.

There is a smaller outdoor tank and another two built into an indoor stage.

Studio tour

Fox created a Studio Tour named Foxploration, which opened in May 2001 consisting largely of Titanic exhibits, Fox-derived displays, and items from other films, notably Master and Commander. This tour closed.

== Films ==
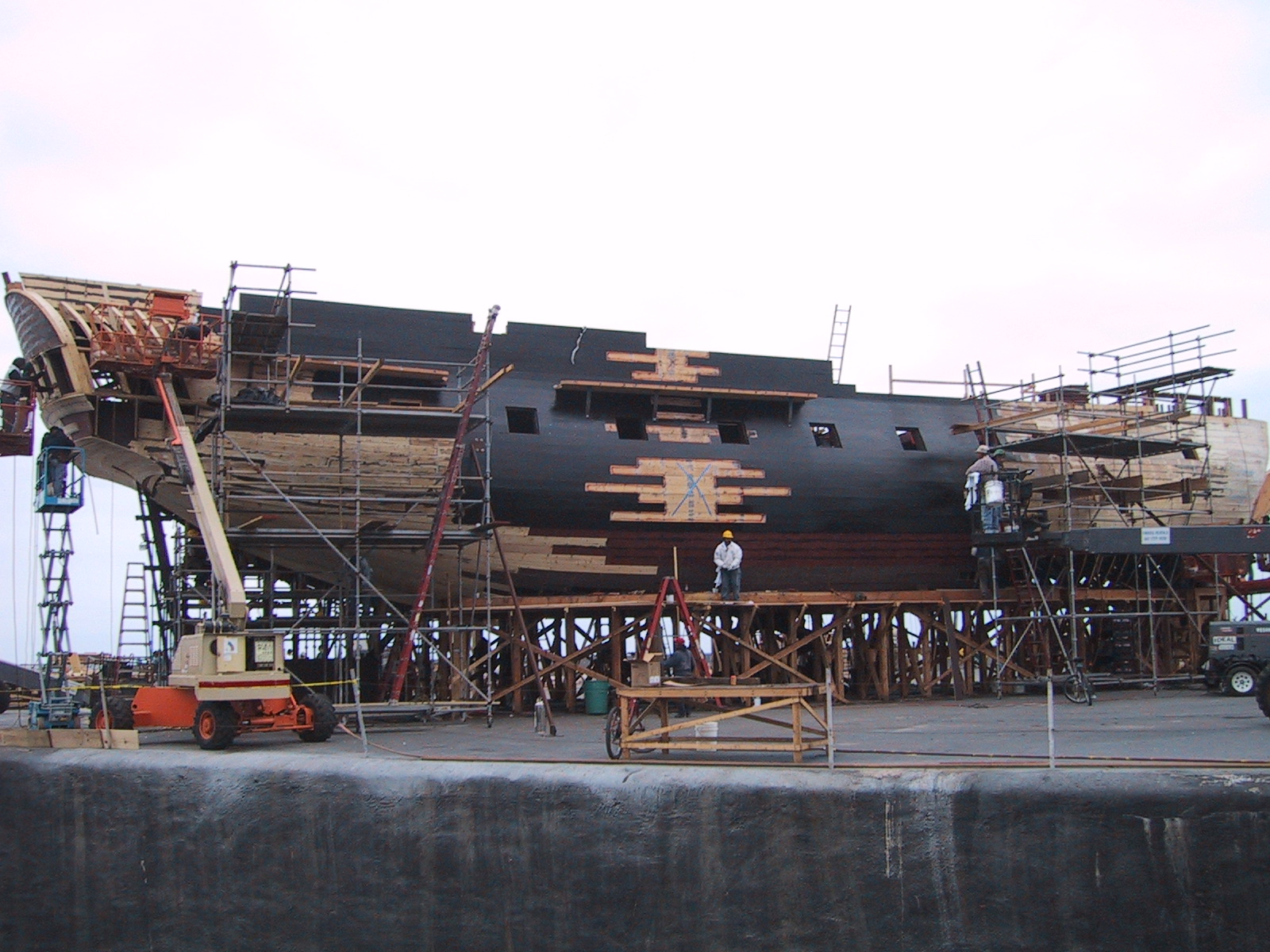
Full size frigate model under construction on set

- Titanic (1997)
- Tomorrow Never Dies (1997) (Second Unit)
- Deep Blue Sea (1999)
- In Dreams (1999)
- The Weight of Water (2000)
- Pearl Harbor (2001)
- Master and Commander: The Far Side of the World (2003)
- Kung Pow! Enter the Fist (2002)
- Ghosts of the Abyss (2003)
- Jumper (2008)
- All Is Lost (2013)
- Against the Sun (2014)
- Little Boy (2015)
- Chappaquiddick (2018)

=== Television ===
- Tremors (2003)
- Fear the Walking Dead (2016) – Season 2
- 9-1-1 (2019) – Season 3
- Selena: The Series (2020–2021) – Part 1 and Part 2
