= Great Stock Exchange Fraud of 1814 =

Manipulation of the London Stock Exchange

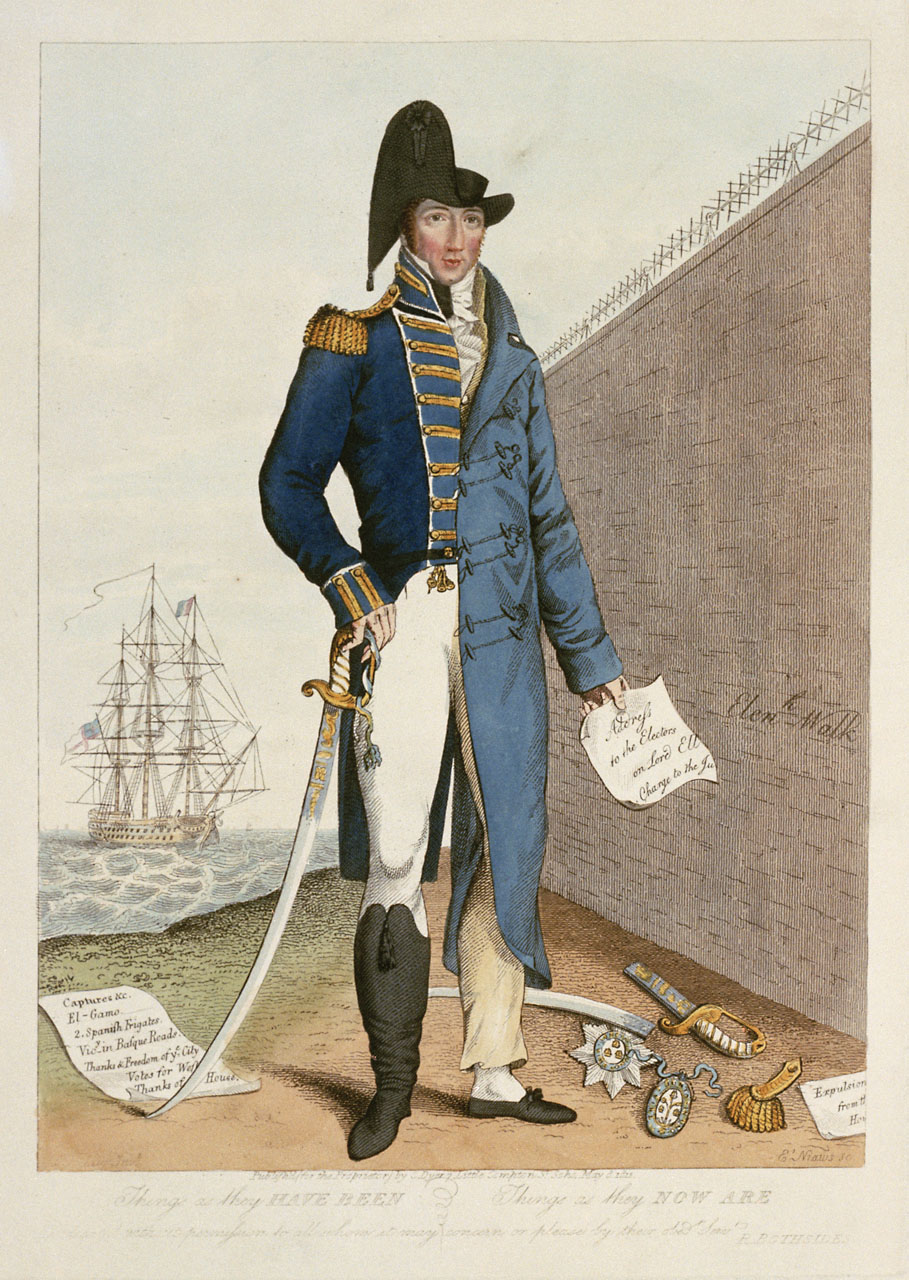
Caricature of Lord Cochrane made shortly after his conviction for fraud in 1814

The Great Stock Exchange Fraud of 1814 was a hoax or fraud centered on false information about the Napoleonic Wars, affecting the London Stock Exchange in 1814.

== The du Bourg hoax ==
On the morning of Monday, 21 February 1814, a uniformed man calling himself Colonel du Bourg and claiming to be aide-de-camp to Lord Cathcart, arrived at the Ship Inn at Dover, England, bearing news that Napoleon I of France had been killed and Bourbon rule restored. Requesting this information to be relayed to the Admiralty in London via semaphore telegraph, "Colonel du Bourg" then travelled to London, stopping at inns on the way to spread the news. Three men posing as French officers dressed in Bourbon uniforms were also seen celebrating in London, proclaiming the restoration of the Bourbon monarchy.

=== Effects on the stock market ===
Rumours of Napoleon's defeat had been circulating throughout the month. When the news from Dover began to circulate among traders at the London Stock Exchange, the value of government securities increased rapidly. With no official confirmation of the news, prices began to drop back, only to increase again on reports of the supposed celebrations of the French officers.

The entire affair proved to be a hoax. In the afternoon, the government confirmed that reports of Napoleon's death and the Bourbon restoration were false. The relevant stock prices immediately fell back to their previous levels.

=== Investigation ===
The Committee of the Stock Exchange, suspecting stock manipulation, launched an investigation. It was soon discovered that there had been a sale that Monday of more than £1.1 million of two government-based stocks, most of it purchased the previous week. Eight people were eventually convicted of conspiracy to defraud, including Lord Cochrane, a Radical member of Parliament and well-known naval hero, his uncle the Hon. Andrew Cochrane-Johnstone, Richard Butt, Lord Cochrane's financial advisor, and Captain Random de Berenger, who had posed both as du Bourg and as one of the French officers. Six, including those involved in the purchases, were tried, and sentenced to twelve months in prison, with the most prominent also sentenced to the public pillory; fines were also imposed. Lord Cochrane was stripped of his naval rank and expelled from the Order of the Bath and from the House of Commons.

Andrew Cochrane-Johnstone fled the country after hearing the verdict.

=== Culpability of Lord Cochrane ===
Though convicted of the fraud, Lord Cochrane continued to assert his innocence. In 1816, he brought an (unsuccessful) charge of "partiality, misrepresentation, injustice and oppression" against Lord Ellenborough, the presiding judge in his case. Popular opinion certainly backed Cochrane; his sentencing was followed by his re-election unopposed to the House of Commons for Westminster. The pillory portion of his sentence was dropped, for fear of public reaction. Due to public outcry over his treatment, the punishment of the pillory was limited to those found guilty of perjury in England and Wales in 1816. Its use was completely discontinued in 1837 in England and Wales (though the stocks, a similar device, lasted the rest of the nineteenth century).

Lord Cochrane continued to petition the government for redress; in 1832, he was granted a free pardon, including reinstatement to his rank of Rear Admiral. Restoration of the Order of the Bath and other honours followed in the subsequent decades, and, in 1877, a Select committee found that his treatment since 1832 constituted "nothing less than a public recognition by those Governments of his innocence."

Lord Cochrane's culpability has been a subject of continued debate. In 1965, the judge Henry Cecil set out an argument that supported Lord Cochrane's guilt in A Matter of Speculation: The Case of Lord Cochrane; Brian Vale's 2004 book The Audacious Admiral Cochrane also argues for his guilt. In his 1981 PhD thesis, John Sugden argued that "the question of his guilt cannot satisfactorily be resolved." Two other historians, Christopher Lloyd in 1947, and David Cordingly in 2007, concluded that Cochrane was innocent.

== Literary references ==
Security speculation based on allegedly accurate news delivered by semaphore telegraph forms a plot event in the novel The Count of Monte Cristo (published 1844).

The Great Stock Exchange Fraud forms the basis for the 11th novel in Patrick O'Brian's Aubrey–Maturin series, The Reverse of the Medal (published 1986).

The Great Stock Exchange Fraud is a key plot element in Katherine Cowley's The True Confessions of a London Spy (published 2022).

== Note ==
In the terminology of 1814, stocks refer to interest-bearing securities of the type that are today called bonds. The fraud particularly involved government bearer bond instruments called 'Omniums', which were partly-paid government bonds, where the purchaser initially only had to pay 10% or 15% of the face value and later made further installment payments. This feature gave the securities a great deal of price volatility, as a small change in the value of the fully-paid bonds would represent a much greater change in the value of the partly-paid Omniums.
