= Master and Commander: The Far Side of the World =

2003 film by Peter Weir

- Theatrical release poster
- Directed by: Peter Weir
- Screenplay by: Peter Weir; John Collee
- Based on: Aubrey–Maturin series by Patrick O'Brian
- Produced by: Samuel Goldwyn Jr.; Duncan Henderson; Peter Weir
- Starring: Russell Crowe; Paul Bettany
- Cinematography: Russell Boyd
- Edited by: Lee Smith
- Music by: Iva Davies; Christopher Gordon; Richard Tognetti
- Production companies: 20th Century Fox; Miramax Films; Universal Pictures; Samuel Goldwyn Films
- Distributed by: 20th Century Fox (Note: Although 20th Century Fox engaged Miramax Films and Universal Pictures to co-finance and co-produce the film, Fox itself distributed the film in the United States and Canada. Universal released the film in Latin America and France through their joint-venture company United International Pictures, Miramax distributed the film in Italy and Japan theatrically through Buena Vista International and Fox released the film in all other countries, Universal distributed the Japanese home media releases.)
- Release date: November 14, 2003
- Running time: 138 minutes
- Country: United States
- Language: English
- Budget: $150 million
- Box office: $211.6 million

Master and Commander: The Far Side of the World is a 2003 American epic period war-drama film co-written, produced and directed by Peter Weir, set during the Napoleonic Wars. The film's plot and characters are loosely adapted from novels in author Patrick O'Brian's Aubrey–Maturin series, which includes 20 completed novels of Jack Aubrey's naval career. The film stars Russell Crowe as Aubrey, captain in the Royal Navy, and Paul Bettany as Dr. Stephen Maturin, the ship's surgeon. This was the second onscreen collaboration for Crowe and Bettany, who previously co-starred in 2001's A Beautiful Mind.

The film was a personal project of 20th Century Fox executive Tom Rothman, who recruited Weir to direct. Filming took place on the open sea, on replica ships in the water tanks of Baja Studios, and in the Galápagos Islands. The film, which cost US$150 million to make, was a co-production of 20th Century Fox, Miramax Films, Universal Pictures, and Samuel Goldwyn Films, and released on November 14, 2003. The film received critical acclaim and grossed $212 million worldwide.

It garnered Weir the BAFTA Award for Best Direction. At the 76th Academy Awards, the film was nominated in ten categories, including Best Picture and Best Director. It won Best Cinematography and Best Sound Editing.

== Plot ==
In April 1805, during the Napoleonic Wars, the British frigate HMS Surprise is ambushed by the French privateer Acheron off Brazil, suffering heavy damage. After escaping into a fog bank, Surprise's captain Jack Aubrey refuses to return to land and insists on having his ship repaired at sea. Shortly afterwards, Surprise is again ambushed by Acheron, but escapes using a decoy raft. Following Acheron southwards to prevent her from attacking British whalers, Surprise heads for the Galápagos Islands, where Aubrey had promised Surprise's surgeon Stephen Maturin several days to explore the islands' unique flora and fauna. However, when she reaches the islands, Surprise rescues survivors from a British whaler burnt by Acheron and Aubrey orders a pursuit of the privateer, upsetting Maturin.

Becalmed for several days, the crew of Surprise becomes restless, and superstition starts taking hold among them. A sailor deliberately bumps into the unpopular midshipman Hollom, whom the crew believe to be a "Jonah", and is flogged; Hollom subsequently commits suicide by jumping overboard. The wind picks up again, and Surprise resumes the chase. The ship's captain of marines accidentally shoots Maturin in the stomach while fowling. As the required operation would be much easier on land, Aubrey orders Surprise to return to the Galápagos, where Maturin performs self-surgery using a mirror. Finally giving up his pursuit of Acheron, Aubrey grants Maturin the chance to explore the Galápagos and gather specimens before they return to Portsmouth. While looking for the flightless cormorant, Maturin discovers Acheron on the other side of the islands. He returns to Surprise and warns Aubrey, who after observing the camouflage ability of Maturin's phasmid specimen orders his ship to be disguised as a whaler.

Acheron falls for the disguise and is ambushed by Surprise, which dismasts the privateer. Aubrey leads a boarding party onto Acheron and captures the ship after fierce hand-to-hand combat. He meets Acheron's surgeon, de Vigny, who informs him that the French ship's captain is dead and gives Aubrey his sword. Both ships are repaired by the crew of Surprise, whose first lieutenant Pullings is promoted to captain and ordered to sail Acheron to Valparaíso to parole their French captives. As Acheron sails away, Maturin mentions to Aubrey that according to her ship logs de Vigny died from a fever months ago. Realizing that the surgeon was actually the captain in disguise, Aubrey orders the crew of Surprise to beat to quarters. Maturin is once again denied the chance to explore the Galápagos, but Aubrey wryly notes that since the bird he seeks is flightless, "it's not going anywhere." The duo play Musica notturna delle strade di Madrid as Surprise turns in pursuit of Acheron once more.

== Cast ==
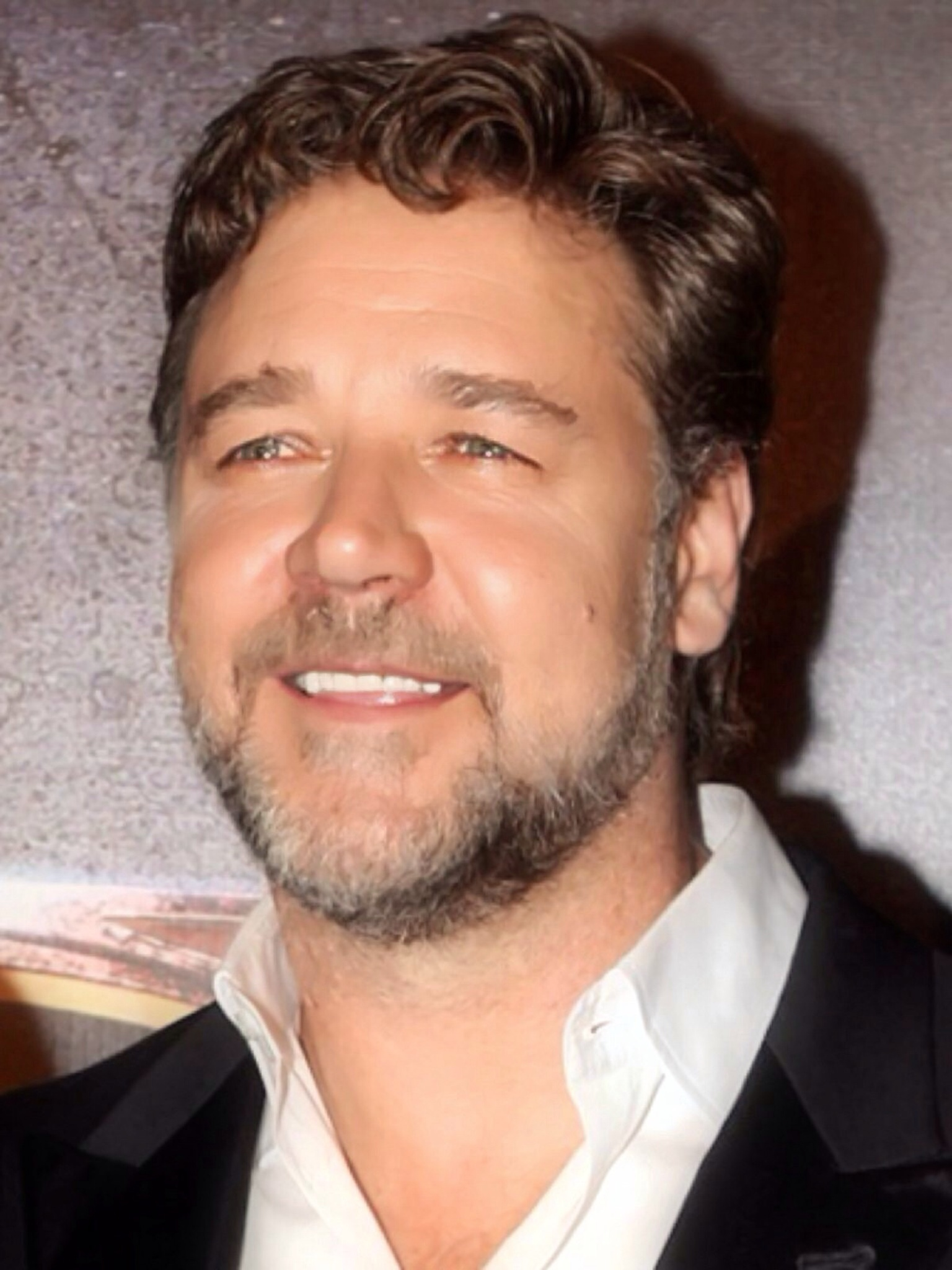
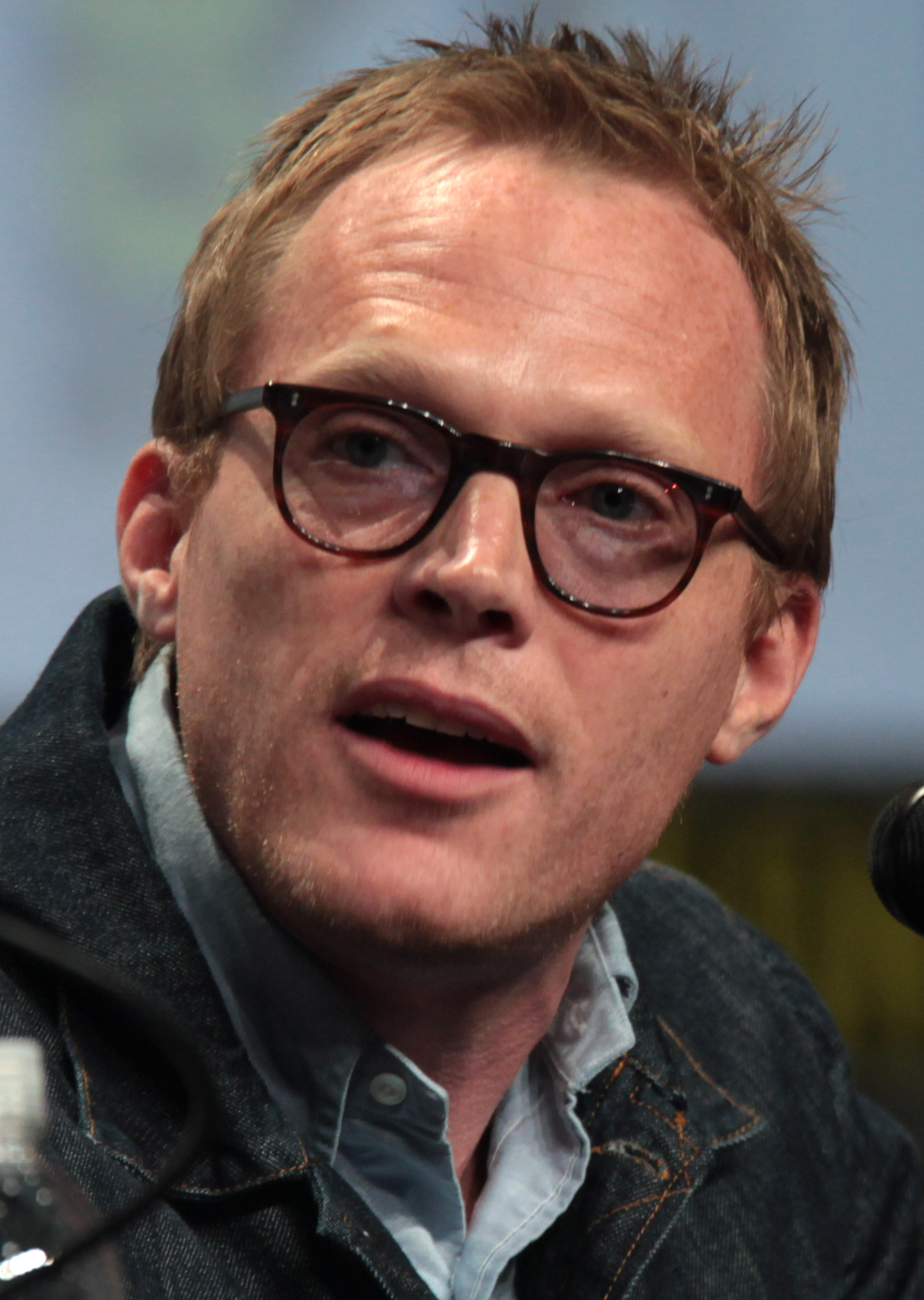
Russell Crowe in 2013 (left) and Paul Bettany in 2014
- Russell Crowe as Jack Aubrey
- Paul Bettany as Stephen Maturin, Surgeon
- James D'Arcy as First Lieutenant Thomas Pullings
- Edward Woodall as Second Lieutenant William Mowett
- Chris Larkin as Captain Howard, Royal Marines
- Robert Pugh as John Allen, Master
- Max Benitz as Midshipman/Acting Third Lieutenant Peter Myles Calamy
- Max Pirkis as Midshipman Lord William Blakeney
- Lee Ingleby as Midshipman Hollom
- Richard McCabe as Mr. Higgins, Surgeon's Mate
- Ian Mercer as Mr. Hollar, Boatswain
- Tony Dolan as Mr. Lamb, Carpenter
- David Threlfall as Preserved Killick, Captain's Steward
- Billy Boyd as Barrett Bonden, Coxswain
- Bryan Dick as Joseph Nagle, Carpenter's Mate
- Joseph Morgan as William Warley, Captain of the Mizzentop
- George Innes as Joe Plaice, Able Seaman
- Patrick Gallagher as Awkward Davies, Able Seaman
- John DeSantis as Padeen Colman, Loblolly Boy
- Mark Lewis Jones as Mr. Hogg, Master of the Whaler Albatross
- Thierry Segall as French captain of the Acheron, disguised as de Vigny, Surgeon

In trying to find men who looked as though they were from the 19th century, Weir recruited many extras from Poland. Philip French noted that the casting of Crowe, an Australian, as a British naval hero followed a tradition in film (e.g. Errol Flynn as Geoffrey Thorpe in The Sea Hawk, Peter Finch as Lord Nelson in Bequest to the Nation, and Mel Gibson as Fletcher Christian in The Bounty).

== Production ==
=== Source material ===
The film is drawn from the Aubrey–Maturin series by Patrick O'Brian, but matches the events in no one novel. The author drew from real events in the Napoleonic Wars, as he describes in the introduction to the first novel, Master and Commander. Various opinions have been offered with regard to which Royal Navy captain most closely matches the fictional character of Aubrey; David Cordingly, writing for The Daily Telegraph, suggested Thomas Cochrane, 10th Earl of Dundonald, a view with which the Royal Navy Museum concurs, at least with regard to the inspiration for the captain's character in the first novel, Master and Commander.

While no specific British naval officer is a complete match for Aubrey, the exploits of two naval captains are said to have inspired events in the novels, the forementioned Captain Lord Thomas Cochrane, and Captain William Wolseley. Cochrane used the ruse of placing a light on a floating barrel at night to avoid capture. Wolseley, aboard HMS Papillon, disguised a ship under his command as a commercial boat; on discovering information that a rogue ship was on the other side of a small island, he sailed around the island and captured the Spanish ship, on April 15, 1805.

The film combines elements from three different novels by O'Brian, but its principal source is his tenth novel, The Far Side of the World. The film, however, takes place in 1805 during the Napoleonic Wars rather than during the War of 1812; University of St. Francis historian Cathy Schultz claimed that the "filmmakers thought American audiences might not want to see Americans as the villains", leading them to "switc[h] the events to 1805", an assertion strongly disputed by 20th Century Fox chief executive Tom Rothman, who initiated the film's development. Rothman also denied claims that France had been used as the villain due to its objection to the Iraq War. He argued that the setting had been changed in order to avoid lengthy historical exposition on why the United States and the United Kingdom were fighting. Rothman also omitted scenes portraying homosexuality, violent impressment and corporal punishments of sailors, and severe hardships of life at sea in order to obtain a PG-13 rating. With regard to further differences between source novel and film, the fictional opponent was changed from USS Norfolk to the U.S.-built French privateer frigate Acheron. (Note: The Acheron design presented in the film was constructed by the film's special-effects team who took stem-to-stern digital scans of USS Constitution at her berth in Boston, from which a computer model of Acheron was created.) As well, the film excludes scenes from the books that took place in ports, and, besides Brazilian women in a single scene, the novels' female characters were not adapted.

The episode in which Aubrey deceives the enemy by means of a raft bearing lanterns is taken from Master and Commander, while the episode in which Maturin directs surgery on himself, while gritting his teeth in pain, to remove a bullet is taken from HMS Surprise.

=== Development ===
20th Century Fox executive Tom Rothman had wished to adapt O'Brian's novels for fifteen years since first reading them, recognizing the potential for a film franchise. He originally began developing the film at The Samuel Goldwyn Company in 1993. However, the film was later acquired by Touchstone Pictures with John McTiernan hired as director. When Rothman became the CEO of Fox, he re-acquired the rights in 1998 and recruited director Peter Weir to helm the project. Rothman later said that “I had to become the chairman of a major motion picture studio before I could get it made."

=== Filming ===
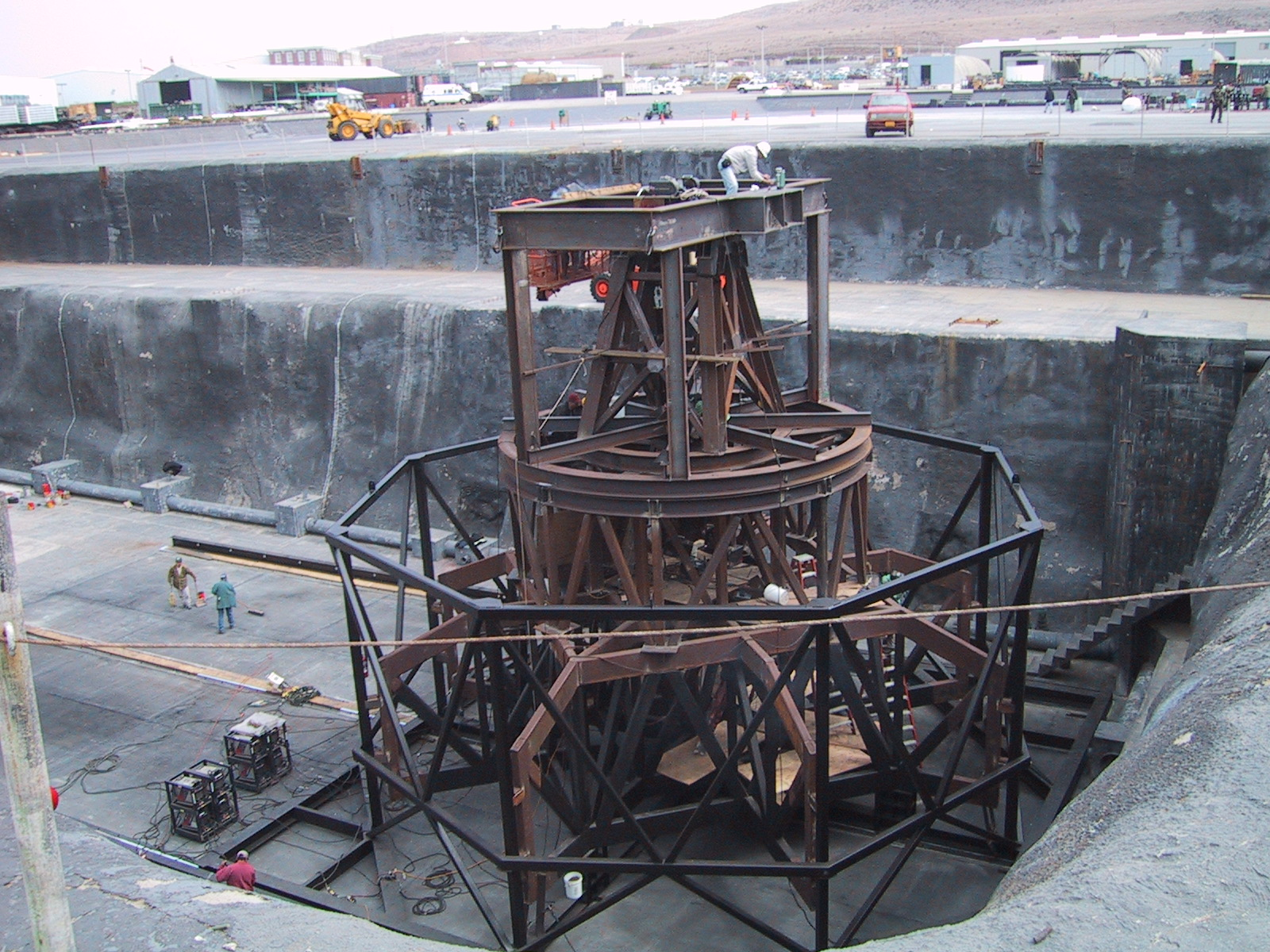
The gimbal upon which the ship was mounted

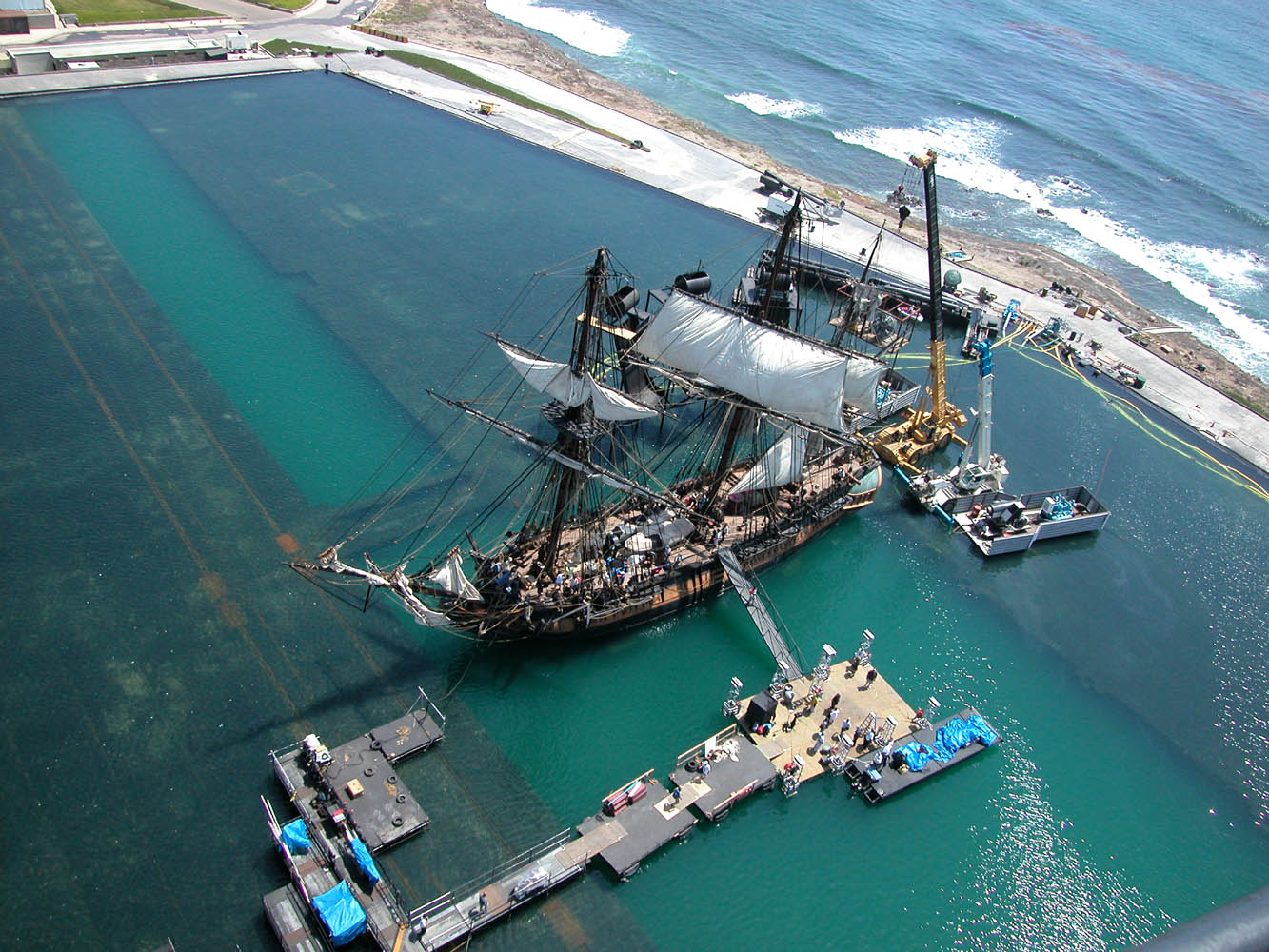
Replica ship at Baja Studios

Great efforts were made to reproduce the authentic look and feel of life aboard an early nineteenth-century man-of-war. In addition to 2,000 hats and 1,900 pairs of shoes, some 400 pounds of hair were used on actors.

However, only ten days of the filming took place at sea aboard Rose (a reproduction of the 18th-century post ship HMS Rose). (Note: The Rose is now renamed HMS Surprise in honor of her movie role; she is moored at the San Diego Maritime Museum and serves as a dockside attraction. In September 2007, the ship was returned to sailing status.) Other scenes were shot on a full-scale replica mounted on gimbals in a nearly 20-million-gallon tank at Baja Studios in Mexico, built for the filming of Titanic (1997).

There was a third HMS Surprise which was a scale model built by Weta Workshop. A storm sequence was enhanced using digitally composited footage of waves shot on board a modern replica of Cook's Endeavour rounding Cape Horn. All of the actors were given a thorough grounding in the naval life of the period in order to make their performances as authentic as possible. The ship's boats used in the film were Russian Naval six- and four-oared yawls supplied by Central Coast Charters and Boat Base Monterey. Their faithful 18th-century appearance complemented the historical accuracy of the rebuilt Rose, whose own boat, the Thorn, could be used only in the Brazilian scene.

Master and Commander was the first non-documentary film to shoot on location in the Galápagos. Filming took place from June to November 2002.

=== Sound ===
Sound designer Richard King earned Master and Commander an Oscar for its sound effects by going to great lengths to record realistic sounds, particularly for the battle scenes and the storm scenes. King and director Peter Weir began by spending months reading the Patrick O'Brian novels in search of descriptions of the sounds that would have been heard on board the ship—for example, the "screeching bellow" of cannon fire and the "deep howl" of a cannonball passing overhead.

King worked with the film's Lead Historical Consultant Gordon Laco, who located collectors in Michigan who owned a 24-pounder and a 12-pounder cannon. King, Laco, and two assistants went to a National Guard base in Michigan and recorded the sounds of the cannon firing. They placed microphones near the cannon to get the "crack" of the cannon fire, and also about 300 yards (270 m) downrange to record the "shrieking" of the chain shot as it passed overhead. They also recorded the sounds of bar shot and grape shot passing overhead, and later mixed the sounds of all three types of shot for the battle scenes.

For the sounds of the shot hitting the ships, they set up wooden targets at the artillery range and blasted them with the cannon, but found the sonic results underwhelming. Instead, they returned to Los Angeles and there recorded sounds of wooden barrels being destroyed. King sometimes added the "crack" of a rifle shot to punctuate the sound of a cannonball hitting a ship's hull.

For the sound of wind in the storm as the ship rounds Cape Horn, King devised a wooden frame rigged with one thousand feet of line and set it in the back of a pickup truck. By driving the truck at 70 miles per hour (110 km/h) into a 30–40-knot (56–74 km/h; 35–46 mph) wind, and modulating the wind with barbecue and refrigerator grills, King was able to create a range of sounds, from "shrieking" to "whistling" to "sighing", simulating the sounds of wind passing through the ship's rigging.

Richard Tognetti, who scored the film's music, taught Crowe how to play the violin, as Aubrey plays the violin with Maturin on his cello in the movie. Crowe purchased the violin personally as the budget did not allow for the expense. The violin was made in 1890 by the Italian violin maker Leandro Bisiach, and sold at auction in 2018 for US$104,000. Bettany learned how to play the cello for the role of Maturin, so the pair could be filmed playing with proper posture and technique instead of miming. The recording was dubbed in the final version of the film.

=== Music ===
The film score is composed and produced by Iva Davies, Christopher Gordon and Richard Tognetti who won the 2004 APRA/AGSC Screen Music Award in the "Best Soundtrack Album" category. The album includes an assortment of baroque and classical music, from the classical musicians which released through Decca Records on November 11, 2003.

== Release and reception ==
=== Theatrical release ===
On November 17, 2003, Master and Commander had its UK Premiere at the 57th Royal Film Performance, a fundraising event held in aid of The Film and TV Charity.

=== Box office ===
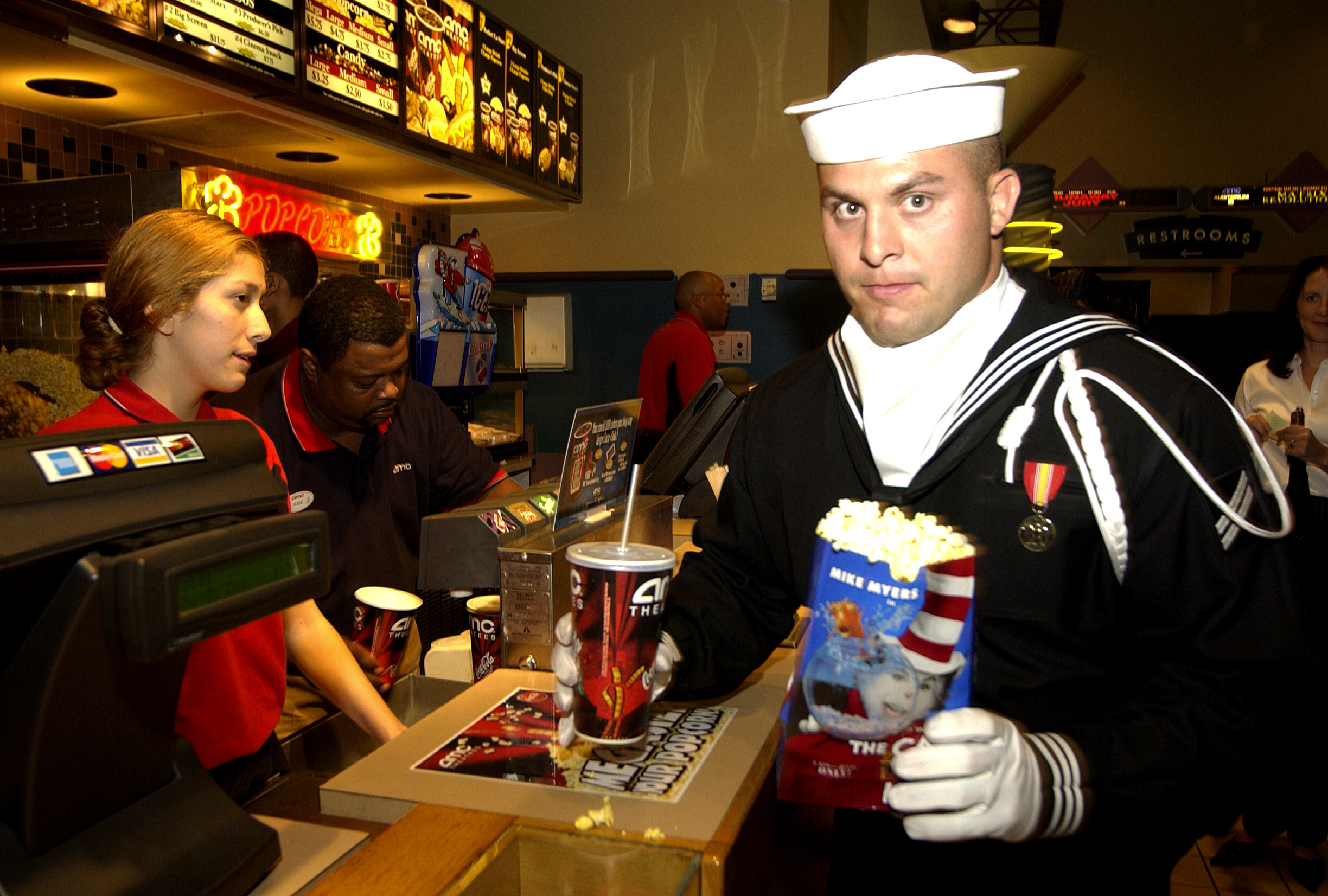
A U.S. serviceman attending a special Department of the Navy screening of Master and Commander

Hoping to draw adults during the film awards seasons, Master and Commander was slated for a release in mid-November 2003. However, the film failed to reach the No. 1 spot on its opening weekend. It opened No. 2 behind Christmas comedy Elf in the first weekend of North American release, November 14–16, 2003, earning $25,105,990. It dropped to the No. 4 position in the second weekend and #6 in the third, and finished the domestic run with $93,927,920 in gross receipts. Outside the U.S. and Canada, the film grossed $118,083,191, doing best in Italy (at $15,111,841). The film grossed $212 million globally, recouping its $150 million budget.

=== Critical response ===
On review aggregate website Rotten Tomatoes, 85% of 222 critics gave Master and Commander: The Far Side of the World an overall positive review, with an average rating of 7.6/10. The site's critics consensus states: "Russell Crowe's rough charm is put to good use in this masterful adaptation of Patrick O'Brian's novel." On Metacritic, the film has a weighted average score of 81 out of 100 based on 42 critics, indicating "universal acclaim". Audiences polled by CinemaScore gave the film an average grade of "B+" on an A+ to F scale.

Roger Ebert gave the film 4 stars out of 4, saying that "it achieves the epic without losing sight of the human". The Guardian's Peter Bradshaw praised the film and Crowe's performance. New York Times critic A. O. Scott described the film as "stupendously entertaining". However, Jason Epstein, also writing for The New York Times, criticized the film, taking issue with changes from the novel, Crowe's "one-dimensional action hero", and implausible events in the script.

Christopher Hitchens gave a mixed review: "Any cinematic adaptation of O'Brian must stand or fall by its success in representing this figure [Dr. Stephen Maturin]. On this the film doesn't even fall, let alone stand. It skips the whole project" (the film omits completely the fact that the doctor and naturalist is also a spy for England—a key plot element in the novels). Hitchens nonetheless praised the action scenes, writing: "In one respect the action lives up to its fictional and actual inspiration. This was the age of Bligh and Cook and of voyages of discovery as well as conquest, and when HMS Surprise makes landfall in the Galapagos Islands we get a beautifully filmed sequence about how the dawn of scientific enlightenment might have felt."

San Francisco Chronicle film reviewer Mick LaSalle was generally downbeat and, after praising director Weir's handling of scenes with no dialogue, observed that "Weir is less surefooted as a screenwriter. Having not read any of O'Brian's novels, I can't say if the fault is in Weir's adaptation or in the source material, but halfway into Master and Commander the friendship of the captain and the doctor begins to seem schematic, as if all the positive traits that an individual could have were divided equally between these two guys, just so they can argue. Their interaction takes on a preening quality, reminiscent of the interaction of the Star Trek characters four or five movies down the line. We come to realize that the specific adventure matters little except as a showcase for these personalities. Once that happens, the story involving the French ship loses much of its interest and all of its danger, and the movie starts taking on water. Master and Commander stays afloat to the finish, but that's all that can be said."

=== Accolades ===
At the 76th Academy Awards in 2004, Master and Commander received ten nominations: Best Cinematography, Best Sound Editing, Best Picture, Best Director, Best Art Direction, Best Costume Design, Best Film Editing, Best Makeup, Best Sound Mixing and Best Visual Effects. It won the awards for Best Cinematography and Best Sound Editing. The film also garnered Weir the BAFTA Award for Best Direction.

== Legacy ==
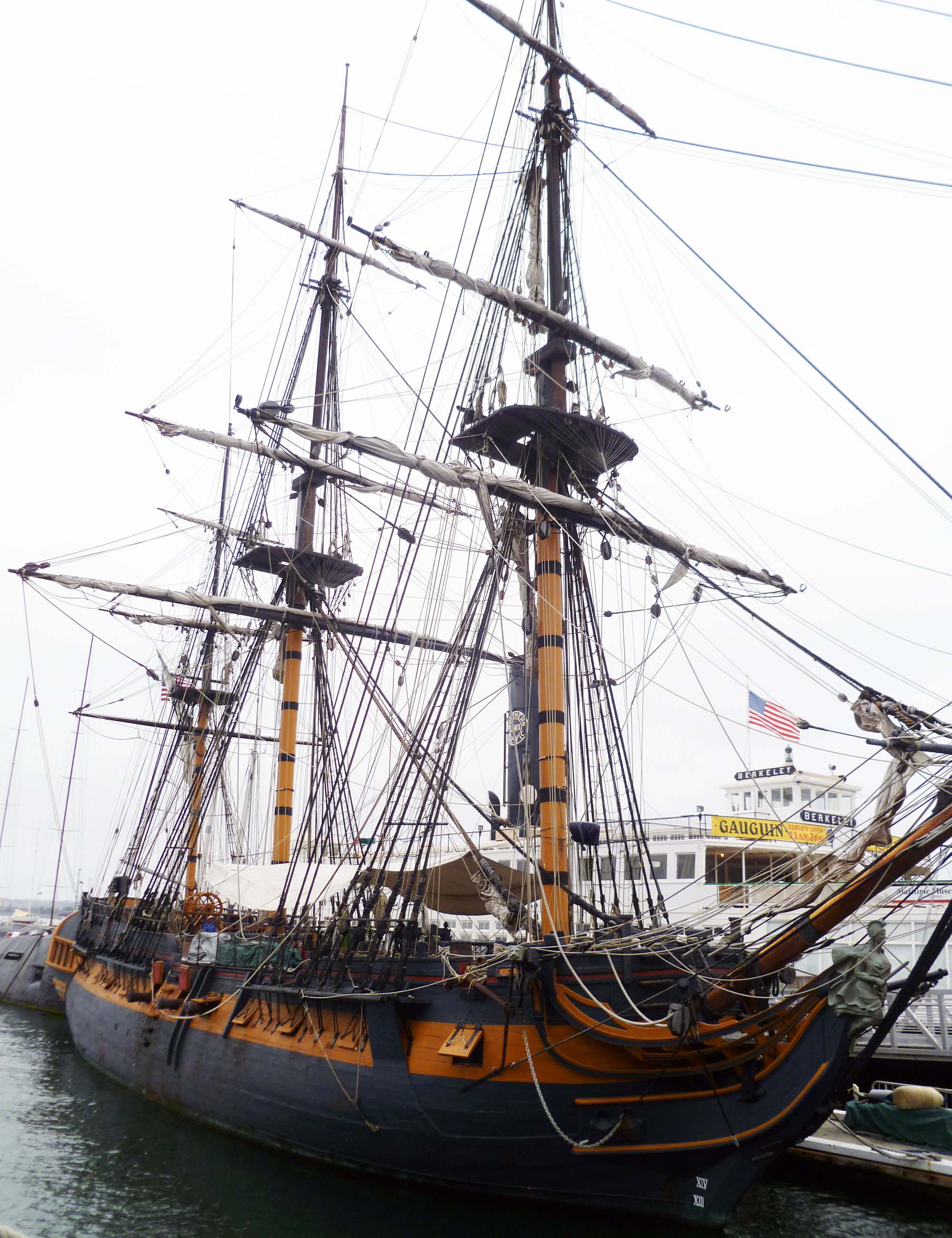
The replica of HMS Surprise used in the film docked in San Diego, 2012

Weir, asked in 2005 if he would make a sequel, stated he thought it "most unlikely", and after internet rumors to the contrary, stated "I think that while it did well...ish at the box office, it didn't generate that monstrous, rapid income that provokes a sequel." In 2007 the film was included on a list of "13 Failed Attempts To Start Film Franchises" by The A.V. Club, writing that "this surely stands as one of the most exciting opening salvos in nonexistent-series history, and the Aubrey–Maturin novels remain untapped cinematic ground."

Naomi Novik, a fantasy author, credits the inspiration for her alternative history series Temeraire where dragons fight in the Napoleonic Wars, as coming from a "naval adventure Napoleonic phase" instigated by watching Master and Commander then reading the Aubrey-Maturin books. Starting by writing fan fiction based on the Aubrey-Maturin characters, Novik eventually would develop her idea of introducing dragons to the Napoleonic wars in what would become the first book in her series, 2006's His Majesty's Dragon.

In 2009 Crowe claimed in an interview with the Associated Press he was in negotiations for a sequel to the film based on the eleventh book from the Aubrey-Maturin series The Reverse of the Medal. In December 2010, Crowe launched an appeal on Twitter to get the sequel made: "If you want a Master and Commander sequel I suggest you e-mail Tom Rothman at Fox and let him know your thoughts".

Film critic Scott Tobias wrote a positive retrospective article about the film in 2019, begrudging the fact that Pirates of the Caribbean: The Curse of the Black Pearl, another sea-faring film also released in 2003, had led to a string of Pirates of the Caribbean fantasy films, but there was no demand for a sequel featuring Captain Jack Aubrey and deeply rooted in historical facts of the Napoleonic Wars, the Age of Sail and the Age of Discovery.

In summer 2020, Vulture noted that the "film is ripe for reappraisal." In January 2021, Crowe publicly defended the film from criticism. A March 2023 story in GQ noted the film's continued popularity among millennial men who were watching the film on streaming services.

In a 2020 retrospective interview discussing both the Aubrey-Maturin books and the film, author Rachel McMillan discussed her opinion on the film as a longtime fan of the original books stating it "captured the essence of the 21 stories as well as the central relationship between Jack and Stephen" and praises Peter Weir's directing. McMillan notes though she finds the film to be "deprived of the women who make the series so exceptional" noting the absence of book characters such as Diana Villiers and Sophie Aubrey as significant omissions in the film along with the lack of Stephen's espionage career. In a 2022 interview, artist Geoff Hunt who made cover art for the Aubrey-Maturin series and is credited as an advisor on the film, noted a sense of regret that the film had tried to condense too much material from the books thus limiting the potential opportunities for sequels. Hunt also expressed his desire to see more of the series adapted to film, particular noting his desire to have seen the espionage plots in Treason's Harbour explored in film.

A tall ship appearing in the background of Deadpool & Wolverine in 2024 was speculated to be a reference to Master and Commander, and the claim was initially backed by the film's director Shawn Levy in a press interview. Levy would retract his statement after consulting with the film's visual effects artists and confirming the 3D model was a generic tall ship.

In 2025, it was one of the films voted for the "Readers' Choice" edition of The New York Times' list of "The 100 Best Movies of the 21st Century," finishing at number 190.

=== Prequel ===
In June 2021, it was reported that a second film is in development by 20th Century Studios, a prequel based on the first novel only, with Patrick Ness penning the script. As of October 2024, the studio was looking for a director.

== Bibliography ==
- McGregor, Tom (2003). The Making of Master and Commander: The Far Side of the World. New York: W.W. Norton. ISBN 0-393-05865-4.
- Tibbetts, John C.; Welsh, James M., eds. (2005). "The Far Side of the World (Master and Commander)". The Encyclopedia of Novels Into Film (Second ed.). Facts on File. pp. 127–129. ISBN 978-0816054497.
