= The Reverse of the Medal =

1986 novel by Patrick O'Brian

- First edition
- Author: Patrick O'Brian
- Cover artist: Arthur Barbosa
- Language: English
- Series: Aubrey-Maturin series
- Genre: Historical novel
- Publisher: Collins (UK)
- Publication date: 1986
- Publication place: United Kingdom
- Media type: Print Hardback & Paperback & Compact audio cassette, Compact Disc
- Pages: 256
- ISBN: 0-00-222733-9
- OCLC: 31728307
- Preceded by: The Far Side of the World
- Followed by: The Letter of Marque

The Reverse of the Medal is the eleventh historical novel in the Aubrey-Maturin series by Patrick O'Brian, first published in 1986. The story is set during the Napoleonic Wars and the War of 1812.

Upon returning to England, Aubrey meets his previously unknown son and faces significant professional and personal challenges on land. Throughout these difficulties, he is supported by his close friend and confidant, Maturin.

This novel was read by Starling Lawrence of American publisher W. W. Norton & Company in 1989. Within a year, Lawrence successfully convinced Norton to publish the rights to O'Brien's books within the United States and began selling highly popular paperbacks of O'Brien's earlier novels.

== Plot summary ==
Jack Aubrey and his crew make their way in a much knocked-about Surprise from the small island near the equator in the Pacific Ocean to the West Indies Squadron at Bridgetown with their American prisoners in a recaptured whaler. Aubrey learns that Sally Mputa was pregnant when they parted over twenty years earlier, at the moment of meeting his grown son, Samuel Panda, who appears to meet him and seek his blessing. Samuel is on his way to the Brazils with Catholic missionaries. Aubrey and Maturin like the young man, and Maturin promises to aid him in his wish to become a priest, as his being illegitimate is a barrier to taking orders. After the court martial for the British mutineers among Aubrey's prisoners, Aubrey leaves quickly for home. The voyage home is enlivened by a chase of the privateer Spartan, which slips away in fog through the blockade to Brest.

Finally ashore in England, Aubrey hears a rumour from a stranger he meets in Dover that peace is coming soon, creating an opportunity to make money in the stock exchange. Mr Palmer claims familiarity with Maturin. Aubrey makes the transactions, and shares the advice with his father, General Aubrey. The General makes large stock transactions and spreads the rumour of peace farther. The transactions prove profitable in the short term, but values fall when the rumour is shown to be false. Aubrey does not sell quickly enough and loses money, though others prosper. Aubrey is arrested for manipulating the market. He is taken to the Marshalsea prison to await trial. General Aubrey flees, leaving his son to fend for himself.

Maturin finds that his wife Diana has gone to Sweden with Jagiello, and that The Grapes, an Inn in the liberties of the Savoy where he has kept rooms for years, has burnt down. Maturin shows Sir Joseph Blaine the brass box full of valuable paper from Danaë and he makes a list of the contents; Blaine will watch to see who tries to cash any of it. Maturin then gives the box to Wray at the Admiralty. Maturin learns that his godfather Ramon d'Ullastret has died, and left him sole heir to an enormous fortune. Pained by the absence of his wife, Maturin returns to the use of laudanum.

Maturin and Blaine find an attorney and an investigator to defend Aubrey from the charges against him at his trial. Maturin advertises a large reward (the gambling debts paid back to him by Wray) for word of Mr Palmer, which proves an error. Palmer is found murdered and mutilated, thus useless for Aubrey's defence. Aubrey, who is unfamiliar with politically motivated trials, expresses confidence in British justice. His career is at stake, but he remains calm, even stoic, accepting the help Maturin gives him, and his wife's support. The trial is completed in two days, one day going on without rest for eighteen hours. The judge, Lord Quinborough, and jury convict him. The punishment is a fine of £2,500 and one hour on the pillory. His name is stricken from the Navy List, not by law but by practice, the worst blow. The pillory is delayed a few days, so word spreads to all his mates. The public square is filled with seamen, who in a display of their support for a beloved and respected captain, push away anyone come to throw stones.

On the day before the trial begins, the Surprise is put up for auction. Maturin, with the aid of Tom Pullings, makes the successful bid. With Blaine's aid, Maturin obtains letters of marque so she can operate as a private man-of-war. Aubrey takes Surprise out immediately. Blaine tells Maturin that there is interest in a mission to Chile, and that Maturin is the preferred agent. Maturin receives a message to meet someone who mentions the Blue Peter, the diamond that Diana gave up to gain Maturin's release in France. He again meets M. Duhamel, who returns the diamond, as was long ago agreed, and supplies Maturin with information on the double agents in London. Duhamel knew the late Palmer only by that alias, and the pair in government is Ledward and Andrew Wray, who also mounted the stock exchange fraud. Maturin is chagrined when he realises what he did not understand in Malta when dealing with Wray. In return, Duhamel wants to leave Europe for Canada, as he is tired of the war. Maturin arranges for him to sail on HMS Eurydice under Captain Dundas, leaving in a few days. As proof, Maturin watches as Duhamel gives money in exchange for an information packet from Ledward and Wray. Maturin seeks Blaine to share with him this vital information.

== Characters ==
- Jack Aubrey: Captain of HMS Surprise and now, the letter of marque Surprise.
- Stephen Maturin: Ship's surgeon, physician, natural philosopher, intelligence officer and good friend to Aubrey.
- Sir Joseph Blaine: Maturin's associate in the intelligence service, entomologist and confidant.
- Sophia Aubrey: Wife of Jack Aubrey and mother of their three children, Charlotte, Fanny and George. She meets Sam Panda before her husband does, telling him where her husband is stationed, making no fuss about it.
- Mrs Williams: Mother of Sophia and her two married sisters.
- Diana Villiers: Wife of Stephen Maturin, not at home in London when he returns.
- Gedymin Jagiello: Young handsome Lithuanian cavalry officer. He was prisoner of war with Aubrey and Maturin in Paris (The Surgeon's Mate), and is good friends with them in England. He returned to Sweden, and Diana Villiers is with him.

At the West Indies station

- Sir William Pellew: Admiral of the West Indies Squadron.
- Mr Waters: Surgeon on HMS Irresistible. Maturin operates on him to remove benign tumour, but Waters dies following the surgery, of infection.
- William Richardson: Flag lieutenant on Irresistible, former midshipman under Aubrey, when he was called Spotted Dick.
- Samuel Panda: Son of Jack Aubrey and Sally Mputa, from a liaison in their youth. He is educated, a Roman Catholic raised by Irish missionaries in Lourenço Marques, who is now in minor orders, wants to be a priest. He is headed to the Brazils with a group of priests. He looks like his father, except with black hair and dark skin.
- William Mowett: First lieutenant on HMS Surprise.
- Barret Bonden: Coxswain to Jack Aubrey since his first command.
- Bob Bonden: Sailmaker on the Irresistible and brother to Barret, who meets him at the West Indies station.
- Joe Plaice: Elderly able seaman on the Surprise and cousin to Barret Bonden.
- Awkward Davies: Able Seaman on the Surprise, who falls into the sea during the chase of the Spartan, and is once again rescued by Aubrey.

In England

- Mr Martin: Royal Navy chaplain, friend of Maturin and natural philosopher, now engaged to marry Polly. After the voyage, he writes a pamphlet critical of the Navy.
- Tom Pullings: Commander needing a ship to captain after bringing the packet Danaë to England. He helps Maturin purchase the Surprise at auction, and keep her safe after the purchase.
- Padeen Colman: Irish-speaking servant to Stephen Maturin.
- Ramon d'Ullastret i Casademon: Wealthy Catalan colonel and Stephen Maturin's godfather, who died while Maturin was at sea. He named Maturin as his sole heir. He was introduced in The Surgeon's Mate.
- Sir John Barrow: Second Secretary of the Admiralty, recuperated and returned to his position.
- Mr Lewis: Functionary in the Admiralty who gains the full force of Maturin's wrath for condescension when Maturin attempts to return the brass box: hears a full flow of words and has his nose pulled.
- Mr Ellis Palmer: Carriage passenger who gives Aubrey false information about purchasing shares, and is later killed by arrangement of Wray, his confederate. He was also a contact to M Duhamel. Alias of Paul Ogle.
- General Aubrey: Father of Jack Aubrey and a Radical MP who speaks up too often and usually to his son's detriment. He buys stocks from unregistered brokers and sells too soon, but he cannot be found when his son is in court.
- Edward Ledward: High level double agent in British government, the mentor to Wray. Sometimes known as Smith in intelligence work.
- Andrew Wray: High level Treasury staff involved in intelligence but a double agent, favouring Napoleon. Revealed as part of stock scam and carrying a long grudge against Aubrey. He gambles and loses, so is in debt, a dangerous situation for an agent. Introduced in Desolation Island.
- Fanny Harte Wray: Wife of Andrew Wray by marriage arranged by her late father, who prefers Babbington. Inherited her father's wealth, which is tied to her and her children, not under the control of her husband.
- William Babbington: Commander who is Captain of the Tartarus. He wants to marry Fanny Wray. He and ship's crew played cricket against former Surprises at Ashgrove Cottage. Introduced in Master and Commander.
- Mr Pratt: Private investigator ("thief taker") and former Bow Street Runner who traces Ellis Palmer.
- Mr Bill Hemmings: Assistant taken on to aid Pratt in the search for Ellis Palmer, now known to be Paul Ogle (sought by his lady friend).
- Mr Lawrence: Defence lawyer for Aubrey, and a fellow Trinity College man to Maturin.
- Lord Quinborough: Judge at the trial for those charged with stock exchange fraud; he is also a Cabinet minister.
- Monsieur Duhamel: Disillusioned French secret agent in London who first aided Maturin and Aubrey to escape France as prisoners of war in The Surgeon's Mate. He is in London, and quite tired of this long war and his role in it.
- Heneage Dundas: Captain of the Eurydice and a close friend of Aubrey; also younger brother of Lord Melville, Head of the Admiralty.

== Ships ==
- British
  - HMS Surprise (a frigate)
  - HMS Irresistible (Admiral's Flag; possibly the third rate ship of the line of 74 guns, launched in 1782 and broken up in 1806)
  - HMS Eurydice
  - William Enderby (recaptured whaler)
- French
  - Diane
- American
  - Spartan (a privateer, approximating a frigate in size)
- Portuguese
  - Nossa Senhora das Necessidades caravel carries the missionaries

== Series chronology ==
This novel references actual events with accurate historical detail, like all in this series. In respect to the internal chronology of the series, it is the fifth of eleven novels (beginning with The Surgeon's Mate) that might take five or six years to happen but are all pegged to an extended 1812, or as Patrick O'Brian says it, 1812a and 1812b (introduction to The Far Side of the World, the tenth novel in this series). The events of The Yellow Admiral again match up with the historical years of the Napoleonic wars in sequence, as the first six novels did.

== Reviews ==
Urged by his cousin to visit the London office of Vivien Greene, Starling Lawrence of W. W. Norton & Company was convinced to read this novel and finished it on his return journey to New York City. Within a year, Lawrence successfully convinced Norton to publish the rights to O'Brian's books within the United States and began selling highly popular paperbacks of O'Brian's earlier novels.

== Allusion to real events and persons ==
O'Brian bases the story of the stock exchange fraud and many of the details of Captain Aubrey's trial on the experiences of Thomas Cochrane, Lord Cochrane. In the Great Stock Exchange Fraud of 1814, Lord Cochrane was tried before Lord Ellenborough at the Guildhall and similarly convicted. Lord Cochrane was sentenced to prison, the pillory and fined £1,000. The pillory portion of Cochrane's sentence was rescinded, for fear of a public backlash.

By contrast, in the novel, the pillory sentence is carried out, but there is no prison time, so that Aubrey will be free to be a privateer, captain of a letter of marque, in a mission that government wants Maturin to carry out. The pillory scene is an opportunity for the seamen, including officers, to show their support of Aubrey, protecting him from Wray's never-ending wrath.

According to O'Brian's Author's Note, Lord Cochrane and his defendants always passionately maintained that he was not guilty and that Lord Ellenborough's conduct of the trial was grossly unfair. Lord Ellenborough and his descendants, however, took the opposite view. One of Lord Ellenborough's descendants (not named in the Author's Note) wrote again about the trial, asking a Mr Attlay (sic) of Lincoln's Inn to address the legal issues. The title or year of the book is not mentioned in the Author's Note, but is the source to which Patrick O'Brian referred for describing "the structure and the curious timetable" of the original trial, for Jack Aubrey's trial in the novel. The book and author are "The trial of Lord Cochrane before Lord Ellenborough" by J.B. Atlay, London 1897.

Anthony G. Brown, in Persons, Animals, Ships, and Cannon in the Aubrey-Maturin Sea Novels of Patrick O'Brien (1999) speculates that the prosecutor at Aubrey's trial may be based on his namesake, solicitor and under-sheriff James Pearce, author of A Treatise on the Abuses of the Laws (1814).

== Adaptations ==
In July 2009, Russell Crowe told the Associated Press that this book would make up the bulk of a second Master and Commander film. As of September 2025, no second film has been produced. At the time of Crowe's comment, there was no word on a director or cast.

== Publication history ==
- 1986 UK William Collins & Co hardback ISBN 0-00-222733-9
- 1992 July USA W W Norton, paperback, ISBN 0393309606 / 9780393309607
- 1994 November USA W W Norton, hardback, ISBN 0393037118 / 9780393037111
- 1994 USA A Borders Audio Exclusive Presentation audio cassette ISBN 1402570694 / 9781402570698 reissued 2006 by Recorded Books, LLC, Unabridged Audio edition on CD narrated by Patrick Tull ISBN 1-4025-7827-X
- 1997 May UK Harper paperback ISBN 0006499260 / 9780006499268
- 2002 June USA Thorndike Press hardback ISBN 0786219319 / 9780786219315
- 2002 UK Chivers Press paperback ISBN 0754091821 / 9780754091820
- 2006 UK Blackstone Audiobooks unabridged narrated by Simon Vance.
- 2011 5 December USA W W Norton & Company ISBN 978-0-393-06383-7) e-book edition

The paperback reissue by W W Norton in the USA in 1992 marked a resurgence in interest in the Aubrey-Maturin series by Patrick O'Brian. Starling Lawrence of that publishing house discovered the novels in 1989, and proceeded to reissue all earlier novels, and then publish following novels in the US when HarperCollins published in the UK. Norton issued The Reverse of the Medal six years after its initial publication, as a paperback in 1992. Ironically, it was a US publisher, J. B. Lippincott & Co., who asked O'Brian to write the first book in the series, Master and Commander published in 1969. Collins picked it up in the UK, and continued to publish each novel as O'Brian completed another story. Beginning with The Nutmeg of Consolation in 1991, the novels were released at about the same time in the USA (by W W Norton) and the UK (by HarperCollins, the name of Collins after a merger).

Novels prior to 1992 were published rapidly in the US for that new market. Following novels were released at the same time by the UK and US publishers. Collins asked Geoff Hunt in 1988 to do the cover art for the twelve books published by then, with The Letter of Marque being the first book to have Hunt's work on the first edition. He continued to paint the covers for future books; the covers were used on both USA and UK editions. Reissues of earlier novels used the Geoff Hunt covers.
