= Cochrane (surname) =

- Pronunciation: /ˈkɒxrən, ˈkɒkrən/ KOK(H)-rən
- Language: Irish, Scottish Gaelic

Origin
- Region of origin: Western Scotland, Ireland

Other names
- Variant forms: Cochran, Cocrane, Cocran, Cochren, Cockram, Cockran, Cockren, Cochern, Colqueran, Coughran, Cofran

Cochrane is a surname with multiple independent origins, two Scottish and one Irish. One of the Scottish names derives from a place in Scotland; the Irish surname and the other Scottish surname are both anglicisations of surnames from the Irish language and Scottish Gaelic respectively.

== History ==
The name Cochrane originates from a habitational name derived from the "Lowlands of Cochrane", near Paisley in Renfrewshire. The derivation of the place name is uncertain. One possibility is that it is derived from the Welsh coch meaning "red"; however this theory is not supported by the early spelling of the name Coueran. It is also possible the name is derived from the Welsh word "cywrain", which means "skilled". Early recorded bearers of the surname are Waldeve de Coueran in 1262; William de Coughran in 1296; and Robert de Cochrane in about 1360.

In Scotland during the 18th century, the surname was used as a Lowland adaptation of the Scottish Gaelic MacEachrain.

In Ireland the surname was adopted as an Anglicisation of the surnames Ó Cogaráin and Mac Cogaráin, meaning respectively the descendant or the son of Cogarán (probably a diminutive of cogar "confidant").

== Demographics ==
The surname is especially concentrated in England in the counties of Durham in the North of England and Kent in the south. In Scotland, Cochrane is found in high frequency in the counties of South Lanarkshire, West Lothian and in Renfrewshire. The surname is the 224th most common surname in Scotland, 957th most common in England and ranked in the top 100 surnames of a number of former British colonies. There are a number of spelling variations including Cochran, Cockren, and Coughran.

Together Scotland and England have the highest percentage of the Cochrane surname anywhere in the world. In Ireland, the surname Cochrane is especially concentrated in the northern province of Ulster where it was introduced by Protestant Scots settlers during the Plantation period of the 17th century. It was also adopted as an anglicisation by some Corcoran families.

In Northern Ireland, the surname Cochrane is concentrated in the counties of Antrim, Londonderry, Down and Tyrone. James Cochrane, an Ulsterman, was a 19th-century entrepreneur who helped the Irish whiskey Bushmills and the Old Bushmills Distillery gain worldwide popularity.

In the United States, Cochranes arrived amongst the Ulster-Scots immigrants to the British North American colonies of New Hampshire and Pennsylvania. Many Cochranes lived in Winedham New Hampshire. They eventually moved to Maryland, with a presence in the Eastern Shore of Maryland. Some of the earliest Cochranes in the United States came from County Antrim, Northern Ireland, in the early 18th century after obtaining a land grant from the Governor of Massachusetts. Later Cochranes would arrive from Scotland and England.

== Motto ==
Virtute et labore, a Latin phrase meaning "by valour and exertion".

== People ==
- Alasdair Cochrane (born 1978), British political theorist and ethicist
- Sir Alexander Inglis Cochrane (1758–1832), British seaman
- Alexander Baillie-Cochrane, British Conservative Party (UK) politician
- Alun Cochrane, Scottish comedian
- Annalisa Cochrane (born 1996), American actress
- Archibald Cochrane, 9th Earl of Dundonald, Scottish nobleman and inventor
- Archibald Cochrane, Rear admiral in the Royal Navy
- Sir Archibald Douglas Cochrane, Unionist-Conservative and British Governor of Burma
- Archie Cochrane, British physician and researcher, after whom the Cochrane Collaboration is named
- Arthur Cochrane (officer of arms) (1872–1954), officer of arms at the College of Arms in London
- Arthur Cochrane (Royal Navy officer) (1824–1905)
- Arthur Ormiston Cochrane (1879–1926), Canadian politician
- Aaron Van Schaick Cochrane (1858–1943), US Representative from New York, nephew of Isaac Whitbeck Van Schaick
- Basil Cochrane (1753–1826), Scottish civil servant, businessman and inventor
- Blake Cochrane (born 1991), Australian Paralympic swimmer
- Caroline Cochrane, Premier of Northwest Territories Canada
- Charles Norris Cochrane, (1889–1945), Canadian historian and philosopher
- Charles Stuart Cochrane. a Scottish officer in the Royal Navy, traveller and entrepreneur (1796–1845)
- Dennis Cochrane (born 1950), Canadian politician and civil servant
- Sir Desmond Cochrane (1918–79)
- Donald Cochrane (politician) (1904–1985), Australian politician
- Donald Cochrane (economist) (1917–1983), Australian econometrician
- Donald Alexander Cochrane, Canadian composer
- Douglas Cochrane, 12th Earl of Dundonald, Scottish representative peer and a British Army general
- Edward Cochrane (1834–1907), Canadian politician
- Edward L. Cochrane (1892–1959), US Navy officer and naval architect
- Elizabeth Jane Cochrane (Nellie Bly, 1864–1922), American journalist, writer and inventor
- Elspeth Seton Cochrane (1916–2011), British actress, playwright, stage manager
- Ethel Cochrane, Canadian Progressive Conservative senator
- Francis Cochrane, Canadian Unionist-Conservative politician

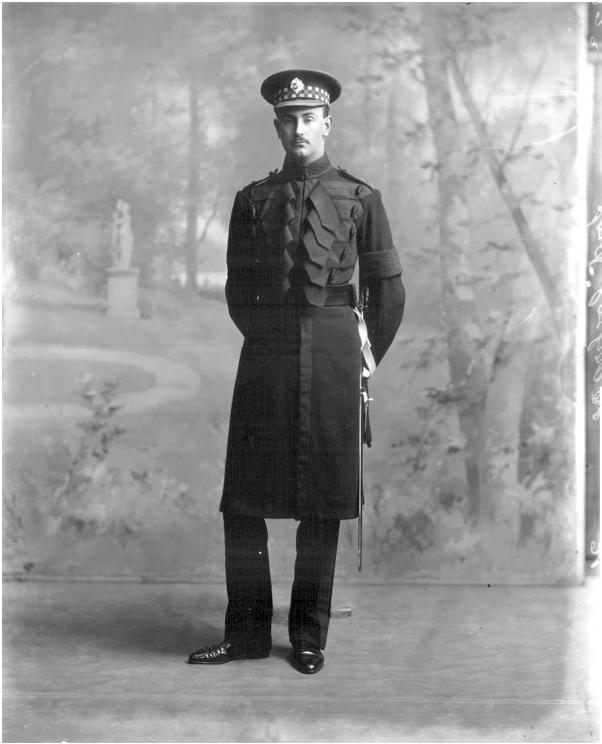
Thomas Hesketh Douglas Blair Cochrane, 13th Earl of Dundonald

- Gordon Cochrane (1916–1994), RNZAF pilot during WWII
- Harry Cochrane, Scottish football player
- Helen Lavinia Cochrane, British artist
- Henry Clay Cochrane, US Marine Corps
- Lieutenant Hugh Stewart Cochrane. 86th (Royal County Down) Regiment of Foot. 1858. Recipient of Victoria Cross after Battle of Jhansi during the Indian Mutiny.
- Ian Cochrane, British novelist
- Jack Cochrane (American football) (born 1999), American football player
- J. Harwood Cochrane (1912–2016), Virginia businessman and philanthropist
- John Cochrane, several people
  - John Cochrane (chess player) (1798–1878), Scottish chess player
  - John Cochrane (politician) (1813–1898), Congressman, Civil War Union general and New York State Attorney General, 1864–1865
  - John Dundas Cochrane (1793–1825), British explorer and cousin of Admiral Thomas Cochrane, 10th Earl of Dundonald
  - John H. Cochrane (born 1957), Economist
  - John M. Cochrane (1859–1904), justice of the North Dakota Supreme Court
- Josephine Cochrane, American inventor
- Justin Cochrane, British football player
- Kira Cochrane, British journalist
- Marco Cochrane (born 1962), American sculptor born in Venice, Italy
- Matthew Henry Cochrane, Canadian industrialist, livestock breeder, and politician
- Michael Cochrane (born 1947), British actor
- Michael Cochrane, jazz pianist
- Mickey Cochrane, Hall of Fame baseball player
- Mike Cochrane, New Zealand hurdler
- Nathaniel Day Cochrane, British naval officer
- Neil Cochrane, football player
- Pauline Atherton Cochrane (born 1929), American librarian
- Ralph Cochrane, British RAF Air Chief Marshal WW2
- Robert Cochrane, architect to the court of King James III of Scotland
- Robert Cochrane, wiccan
- Rory Cochrane, American actor
- Ryan Cochrane, American soccer player
- Ryan Cochrane, Canadian swimmer
- Terry Cochrane, Northern Irish footballer
- Terry Cochrane, Canadian football player
- Thomas Cochrane, 10th Earl of Dundonald, 19th century Royal Navy Admiral and British Whig Party politician (1775–1860), a British naval officer, politician and mercenary. Serving during the French Revolutionary and Napoleonic Wars in the Royal Navy, his naval successes led Napoleon to nickname him le Loup des Mers (the Sea Wolf).
- Thomas Cochrane, 1st Baron Cochrane of Cults, Scottish Conservative-Unionist. British Army general.
- Thomas John Cochrane 19th century Governor of Newfoundland
- Tom Cochrane, Canadian musician
- Vincent Cochrane (1916–1987), American mycologist
- William Cochrane, Scottish MP in the British Parliament
- William Cochrane, 1st Earl of Dundonald (1605–1685)
- William Arthur Cochrane, Canadian physician, paediatrician, academic, and medical executive
- William Cochran (physicist) Scottish physicist

== Fictional characters ==
- Zefram Cochrane, inventor of the warp drive in the Star Trek universe
- Col. Cochrane, character in Child's Play 3
- Amos "Doc" Cochran, portrayed by Brad Dourif, doctor in the HBO series Deadwood

== See also ==
- Cochrane baronets (1903–)
- Cochran
- Corcoran
