= Cochran =

- Pronunciation: /ˈkɒxrən, ˈkɒkrən/ KOK(H)-rən
- Language: Scottish Gaelic, Irish Gaelic

Origin
- Meaning: From Cochrane in Scotland, has two known meanings being either "red brook" or Battle Cry (residential); Anglicisation of corcair, meaning "crimson"
- Region of origin: Western Scotland, Ulster

Other names
- Variant forms: Cochrane, Cocrane, Cocran, Cochren, Cockram, Cockrum, Cockran, Cockren, Cochern, Colqueran, Coughran, Cofran, Coffran

Cochran is a surname of Scottish (and most likely of Cumbric) origin. The earliest known appearance is in Dumbartonshire (14th cent). The definition is unclear, however, the name may be derived from the extinct Cumbric language, which is closely related to the Welsh language. At the time of the British census of 1881, its relative frequency was highest in Renfrewshire (34.3 times the British average), followed by Wigtownshire, Ayrshire, Dunbartonshire, Lanarkshire, Buteshire, Stirlingshire, Argyll, Kirkcudbrightshire and Forfarshire. The Cochrans are traditionally mainly a Western Lowlands family.

Notable people with the surname include:

- Alexander Gilmore Cochran (1846–1928), US Congressman from Pennsylvania
- Alexander Smith Cochran (1874–1929), American businessman and philanthropist
- Anita Cochran, American singer-songwriter
- Anne Cochran, American singer
- Barbara Cochran (born 1951), American Olympic gold medal skier
- Bert Cochran (1913–1984), American Communist politician and writer
- Beth Cochran (born 1964), Canadian basketball player
- Charles B. Cochran (1872–1951), English stage actor and theatrical manager
- Curtis Cochran, American politician
- Dale M. Cochran (1928–2018), American farmer and politician
- Denny Cochran (1915–1992), American football player
- Dorcas Cochran (c. 1903 – 1991), American lyricist and screenwriter
- Doris Mable Cochran (1898–1968), American zoologist
- Eddie Cochran (1938–1960), American rock and roll singer-songwriter and guitarist
- Gregory Cochran (born 1953), American professor at the University of Utah
- Hank Cochran (1935–2010), American country music singer and songwriter
- Jacob Cochran (1782–1836), "spiritual wifery" cult leader in Saco, Maine
- Jacqueline Cochran (1906–1980), American aviator
- John Cochran (disambiguation), multiple people
- Johnnie Cochran (1937–2005), American attorney
- Joseph Gallup Cochran (1817–1871), American missionary and translator in Iran
- Joseph Plumb Cochran (1855–1905), American missionary and doctor in Iran
- Julian Cochran (born 1974), Australian composer
- Leslie Cochran (1951–2012), American homeless man and activist
- Neil Cochran (born 1965), Scottish swimmer
- Neil Kennedy-Cochran-Patrick (1926–1994), British Olympic sailor
- Pat Cochran (1916–2007), American politician
- Philip Cochran (1910–1979), U.S. Army Air Forces colonel and inspiration for characters in the comic strips, Terry and the Pirates and Steve Canyon
- Ron Cochran (1912–1994), American television news journalist
- Robert Cochran (disambiguation), several people
- Russ Cochran (born 1958), American golfer
- Ryan Cochran-Siegle (born 1992), American alpine skier
- Samuel Cochran (1871–1952), American medical missionary
- Stephen Cochran (born 1979), American country music singer and songwriter
- Thomas C. Cochran (1877–1935), US Congressman from Pennsylvania
- Thad Cochran (1937–2019), American politician
- Wayne Cochran (1939–2017), American singer
- William Gemmell Cochran (1909–1980), British statistician working in the United States, the person Cochran's theorem, Cochran's C test, Cochran's Q test and Cochran’s sample size formula were named for
- William Kennedy-Cochran-Patrick (1896–1933), Scottish flying ace
