= Elsbeth =

Elsbeth is a feminine given name and a surname. Notable people with the name include:

== Given name ==
- Elsbeth Juda (1911–2014), British photographer
- Elsbeth Lange (1928–2009), German palynologist and archaeologist
- Elsbeth Levy Bothe (1927–2013), American attorney and judge
- Elsbeth Schragmüller (1887–1940), German spy during World War I
- Elsbeth Steinheil (1893-1955), first German woman to graduate in mechanical engineering, qualifying in 1917 from the Technical University of Munich
- Elsbeth Tronstad (born 1956), Norwegian businessperson and politician for the Conservative Party
- Elsbeth van Rooy-Vink (born 1973), Dutch cyclist specializing in competitive mountain biking
- Elsbeth von Keudell (1857–1953), German nurse, recipient of the Florence Nightingale Medal

== Surname ==
- Thomas Elsbeth (died after 1624), German composer

== Fictional characters ==
- Elsbeth Tascioni, character from the television series The Good Wife, The Good Fight, and Elsbeth
  - Elsbeth, the eponymous television series
- Morgan Elsbeth, Star Wars character that first appeared in the second season of the 2019 streaming series The Mandalorian

== See also ==
- Elspeth, a given name
