= Elspeth =

Female name; Scottish form of Elizabeth

- Gender: Female

Origin
- Origin: Scots
- Meaning: Chosen or consecrated by God, pledged by God
- Region of origin: Scotland

Other names
- Related names: Elizabeth

Elspeth or Elspet is a feminine given name, which is the Scottish form of Elizabeth. It means "chosen by God" or "consecrated by God".

The name may refer to:

== People ==
- Elspeth Attwooll (born 1943), English politician
- Elspeth Ballantyne (born 1939), Australian actress
- Elspeth Barker (1940–2022), Scottish writer
- Elspeth Beard (born 1959), English motorcyclist
- Elspeth Buchan (1738–1791), Scottish religious leader
- Elspeth Cameron (1943–2025), Canadian writer
- Elspeth Campbell (1940–2023), English political spouse
- Elspeth Champcommunal (1888–1976), English fashion designer and editor
- Elspeth Denning (born 1956), Australian field hockey player
- Elspeth Duxbury (1909–1967) English actress
- Elspeth Eric (1907–1993), American actress
- Elspeth Garman (born 1955), English scientist
- Elspeth Gibson (born 1963), English fashion designer
- Elspeth R. M. Dusinberre (1968), American professor of classics
- Elspet Gray (1929–2013), Scottish actress
- Elspeth Hanson (born 1986), English musician
- Elspeth Howe (1932–2022), English public servant
- Elspeth Huxley (1907–1997), Kenyan writer
- Elspeth Kennedy (1921–2006), English scholar
- Elspeth March (1911–1999), English actress
- Elspeth McLachlan (born 1942), Australian scientist
- Elspeth Probyn (1958–2025), Australian writer
- Elspeth Reoch (died 1616), alleged Scottish witch
- Elspeth Rostow (1917–2007), American educator
- Elspeth Sandys (born 1940), New Zealand author
- Elspeth Seton Cochrane (1916–2011), British actress, playwright, stage manager
- Elspeth Thompson (1961–2010), English journalist

Granddaughter of Scottish footballer Humphrey Gouldie Hunter, Australian lawyer and entrepreneur

== Fiction ==
- Elspeth, character in the Evil Genius series by Catherine Jinks
- Elspeth, apprentice sorceress in the animated television series Gawayn
- Elspeth, character in the novel Rewrite: Loops in the Timescape by Gregory Benford
- Elspeth Cary, character in The Day of the Triffids by John Wyndham
- Elspeth Cunningham, character in Go Tell the Bees That I Am Gone by Diana Gabaldon
- Elspeth Gordie, character in Obernewtyn Chronicles by Isobelle Carmody
- Elspeth Honey, character in No Highway by Nevil Shute
- Elspeth MacLeod, character in Remembering Laughter by Wallace Stegner
- Elspat MacTavish, character in The Highland Widow by Walter Scott
- Elspeth MacTout, character from The Family-Ness
- Elspeth McGillicuddy, character in 4:50 from Paddington by Agatha Christie
- Elspeth Morrison-Flashman, character in The Flashman Papers novel series by George McDonald Fraser
- Elspeth Noblin, character in Her Fearful Symmetry by Audrey Niffenegger
- Elspeth Tirel, character in the trading card game Magic: The Gathering
- Princess Elspeth, character in several Valdemar novels by Mercedes Lackey
- Saint Elspeth, character in the computer game RuneScape
- Lady Elspeth Tsepish, character in the game King's Quest VII: The Princeless Bride
- Elspeth Scallon, aka Sister Cecily in the book In This House of Brede by Rumer Godden
- Elspeth, character (a witch and mother of Zora) in W. E. B. Du Bois's The Quest of the Silver Fleece
- Lady Elspeth Catton, character played by Rosamund Pike in the film Saltburn written and directed by Emerald Fennell
- Elspeth, character in the novel Katabasis by R.F Kuang

== See also ==
- Elspeth (band), an Irish rock band
- Elsbeth, a given name and surname
