= Graham Roos =

British poet and artist (born 1966)

Graham Roos FRSA (born 1966, Sheffield, UK) is a director, producer, writer and performer. His work has appeared in print, on stage, television and radio. In 2011 he was appointed the first Creative Artist in Residence at the University of Buckingham.

== Career ==
Roos was awarded the Art Exhibition to Rugby School and subsequently attended the Great Eastern Stage School before taking his first degree at Buckingham University, where he wrote and directed his first play.

After a brief period working for the British Museum, Society for Psychical Research and lecturing in media, Roos devoted himself full-time to writing and performing poetry, joining British poet Victoria Moseley's group, Paradigm Poets, in 1997. During this period he worked alongside budding rock star Pete Doherty, who recorded his time with Roos and Paradigm Poets in his work The Books of Albion: The Collected Writings of Peter Doherty. In 2005 Roos appeared in Max Carlish's Rockumentary Stalking Pete Doherty for Channel 4 recalling this time. From the late 1990s onwards Roos has performed at venues throughout London, including the Southwark Playhouse, Riverside Studios, The Chelsea Arts Club, The Groucho Club, the ICA, The Café de Paris – where he appeared with Boy George in a celebration of the life of Marc Bolan – and St John's, Smith Square.

In 2003 he co-founded Large UK a magazine of eclectic fashion and satire which won Best specialist consumer Front Cover of the Year at the Magazine Design Awards. Subsequently he returned to Sheffield and took an MA in Screen Arts at Sheffield Hallam University. Returning to London in 2007 to host the memorial concert of his one time mentor, the late impresario Alan Sievewright, he joined Dominic Muldowney in 2008 as project poet to the Royal Opera House project Opera Genesis. This later combined with the London Sinfonietta's project the Art of News which was sponsored by The Guardian newspaper and which Roos curated with Muldowney at King's Place in January 2009. For this Roos wrote the libretto to Songs of the Zeitgeist sung by Daniel Evans. This project aimed to take newspaper headlines and transpose them into songs whilst keeping a journalistic feel without turning these headlines directly into poetry. The event attracted mixed reviews, notably from Richard Morrison at The Times. This three-night event also saw the premiere at King's Place of Roos's verse play Apocalypse Calypso with Fenella Fielding, Janet Suzman, Roos and Benedict Hopper. Suzman has said of Roos "Graham Roos has a way with words; his poetry is vivid, catchy and thought-provoking. He leads the generation of young troubadours responding with verve to the world we have dumped on them."

In 2009 Roos presented a semi-staged reading of a new play Son of Many Fathers, with Derek Jacobi in the lead, directed by Di Trevis at the European School of Young Performers, and in 2010 showcased a performance of his most recent play Her Holiness the Pope at LAMDA. In 2012, he joined the staff at LAMDA leading the Foundation Course in History and context of Theatre and teaching the MA in High Comedy. Whilst there he inaugurated a series of interviews entitled In Conversation With talking to some theatre greats about their careers in the theatres, these interviews include, Fenella Fielding, Patricia Hodge, Peter Benedict and Sian Phillips. In 2012 his film My Other Life, which was his final work as Creative Artist in Residence for the University of Buckingham was premiered as official selection at Portobello Film Festival following 9 Buckingham students through a year in their life using the media of music, poetry and song.

In 2016 Roos formed an association with Yvonne Evans and her production company Seven Star Concerts promoting music and text, working first as Artistic Director and later as a writer performer. Her Show for Seven Stars - An Evening With Vivien Leigh, a celebration in words and music of the life of Vivien Leigh premiered at London's West End Cabaret venue Crazy Coqs in 2018.

In 2017 Roos teamed up with former Bond Girl Carole Ashby to make a number of films exploring the mysterious side of life. A pilot Ashby's Odyssey was filmed in 2018 produced and directed by Roos and presented by Carole Ashby which received its premiere at Regent Street Cinema. A series is pre production as of 2020.

== Bibliography ==
- Rave.Oberon Books 1997 This book, inspired by the rave scene of the 1990s, is verse for the dance generation.
- Large Magazine (UK) 2002. Cult magazine co-founded and financed by Roos containing an eclectic blend of satire and fashion notable for its contributions from contemporary London talent such as Sebastian Horsley. Under Roos's aegis the magazine won Best Front Cover of the year award at the Magazine Design Awards in 2003.
- Apocalypse Calypso. University of Buckingham Press 2012. This book contains much of the material created for "the Art of News" project with the London Sinfonietta with additional material created for the Home House poetry salon. "An original, inspirational writer, poet and performer, and a wizard when he wants to be, Graham Roos is a master of the unexpected, his work possessing a rare, visceral energy that tends to get into your veins." Julie Alpine – journalist and writer

== Discography ==
- Quest 2003 featuring the voices of Fenella Fielding, Peter Wyngarde, Sam Fox, James Dreyfus and Martin Hancock. This was an experimental limited edition of verse and music under the FLF Seedpod label. exploring the boundaries between poetry, lyrics and music.

== Films ==
- Desire 2007 a modern take on the Orpheus myth.
- Remembrance Day 2008 premiered at The Portobello Film Festival.
- The Minotaur 2009 starring Ryan Sampson Portobello Film Festival in 2009
- My Other Life 2012 Portobello Film Festival
- Ashby's Odyssey 2019 Regent Street Cinema
