= John Cochrane =

John Cochrane may refer to:

- Sir John Cochrane (Royalist) (died 1650), Scottish diplomat and soldier
- Sir John Cochrane of Ochiltree (died 1695), Scottish soldier implicated in Monmouth's conspiracy and the Rye House plot
- John Cochrane (merchant) (1750–1801), merchant and author from a Scottish aristocratic family
- John Dundas Cochrane (1780–1825), British Royal Navy officer and explorer, cousin of Admiral Thomas Cochrane, 10th Earl of Dundonald
- John George Cochrane (1781–1852), Scottish bibliographer
- John Cochrane (chess player) (1798–1878), Scottish chess player
- John Cochrane (politician) (1813–1898), Congressman, American Civil War Union general and New York State Attorney General, 1864–1865
- John C. Cochrane (1835–1887), American architect
- John M. Cochrane (1859–1904), Justice of the North Dakota Supreme Court
- Johnny Cochrane, Scottish football manager
- John Cochrane (pilot) (1930–2006), British aviator
- John H. Cochrane (born 1957), American financial economist at the University of Chicago Booth School of Business
- John Cochrane and Brothers, Scottish sculptors

== See also ==
- John Cochran (disambiguation)
