= Dougal and the Blue Cat =

- Theatrical release poster
- Directed by: Serge Danot
- Written by: Eric Thompson (English version); Serge Danot; J. Josselin
- Produced by: L. Auclin; L. Danot
- Starring: Christian Riehl; Nadine Legrand; Paul Bisciglia; Pascale Priou; Christine Lepebvre; Denise Bourel; Jean-Luc Tardieu; Pierre Perval; Jean Anneron
- Narrated by: Eric Thompson (English version)
- Cinematography: Claude Giresse
- Edited by: S. Gerstemberg
- Music by: Joss Baselli
- Production company: Danot Films
- Distributed by: Valoria Films
- Release date: 23 December 1970
- Running time: 82 minutes
- Country: France
- Language: French

Dougal and the Blue Cat (French: Pollux et le Chat Bleu) is a 1970 French animated film based on The Magic Roundabout directed by Serge Danot. It was released in France in December 1970 and its English version, narrated by Eric Thompson, like the original series, was released in 1972.

== Plot ==
One morning in the magic garden, after a rude awakening from his cuckoo clock, Dougal the dog remembers a strange event that happened the night before. He then takes the train to speak to Zebedee about it (while briefly conversing with Ermintrude, Brian, Dylan, and Mr. MacHenry on the way). Dougal recounts how, after being awoken and greeted by a strange red owl, he had heard two voices coming from the old treacle factory that had been shut down. The second voice, a female, repeatedly says, "Blue is beautiful, blue is best. I'm blue, I'm beautiful, I'm best!" After the flashback, Zebedee suggests Dougal talk with Florence.

At the roundabout, Florence is greeted by Mr. Rusty and the other kids who show her a surprise: a sly blue cat, who introduces himself as Buxton. After Zebedee arrives and tells Florence of Dougal's dilemma, Florence goes to the garden and introduces Dougal to Buxton. As she takes him to the bridge to meet the other animals, Dougal becomes jealous of the attention directed toward Buxton, and suspicious that the blue cat's arrival might be related to the strange event from the previous night. Sure enough, no one is aware that the blue cat plots to take over the garden.

Sometime later, after taking a nap in Dougal's bed (which Dougal objected), Buxton sneaks off to the treacle factory. He introduces himself to the Blue Voice a.k.a. Madam Blue, who plots to transform everything in the world blue, with everything that isn't blue to be destroyed, while anyone who isn't blue will be imprisoned. Buxton then enters the ruins of the old treacle factory and is crowned King after correctly identifying the colours of seven doors, each coloured different shades of blue.

Back at the garden, the gang finds Dougal, having been previously stuck from an elevated platform, who tries to warn everyone that Buxton is evil. As the cat manages to keep them from suspecting, some of the characters begin to take notice when blue cacti start appearing. A distressed Zebedee arrives, claiming that his moustache has gone missing (in the French version, he somewhat predicted that bad luck would occur, when his moustache began itching earlier in the movie). While the group searches for the magic moustache, Buxton sneaks back to the factory again and orders his army to capture everyone. Every character, except for Dougal, is eventually taken and imprisoned in the factory dungeon. Buxton reveals himself to be in possession of Zebedee's magic moustache, so they are unable to escape with magic.

Upon finding out about his friends from a scarecrow, Dougal has the idea to dye himself blue (in the French version, the scarecrow gives him this idea). Arriving to the factory from falling into a trapdoor, he introduces himself to Buxton as Blue Peter and says that he hates sugar. To make sure of this, Buxton proceeds to lock Dougal in a torture chamber, which is a room full of sugar cubes. Dougal faces the dilemma of eating the sugar, and revealing his true identity, or resisting the sugar, thus earning Buxton's trust. He resists, and is released from the room and given the title of Prime Minister.

Dougal takes a "tour" of the caves beneath the treacle factory, and manages to locate his friends in the dungeon, only to be followed by Buxton. Madam Blue then orders the two to conquer the Moon (and paint it blue, as revealed in the French version). Whilst on the Moon, Dougal falls in a puddle and his dye washes off, revealing his true identity. The pair begin to fight, but manage to make it to the rocket Dougal manages to make it safely to Earth with a parachute, while Buxton, still in the rocket, crashes inside the factory. Upon finding out about "Blue Peter's" true identity, Madam Blue becomes infuriated, causing a lightning storm around the factory, and strips Buxton of his title. Dougal frees everyone from the prison cell, but as they escape, Brian tries to tell Dougal that they've forgotten something. Brian takes it upon himself to reenter the factory on his own, only for the factory to collapse to the ground.

The group return to the magic garden, and come across a tearfully remorseful Buxton. When Dougal tells the gang what happened to Brian, they all mourn for their friend, causing Buxton to "blush for shame", revealing his true colour to be white. Brian then shows up alive and well and reveals that he brought back Zebedee's magic moustache. After this, Mr. MacHenry uses magic to makes it snow and Mr. Rusty gives everyone a ride on the magic roundabout.

== Cast ==
=== French cast ===
- Christian Riehl as Pollux, Père Pivoin, Zébulon
- Nadine Legrand as Margote
- Paul Bisciglia as The Blue Cat
- Pascale Priou as Azalée
- Christine Lepebvre as The Blue Voice
- Denise Bourel as Coralie/Cuckoo
- Jean-Luc Tardieu as Jouvence Pio
- Pierre Perval as Train
- Jean Anneron as Ambroise/Basile

=== English cast ===
- Eric Thompson
- Fenella Fielding as The Blue Voice (uncredited)

== Music ==
All music and songs were composed by Jose Baselli and were released on an LP in 1970, shortly after the movie's release in France. 17 tracks were composed for the film, nine of them being musical numbers featured in the film.

In 1970, an LP of Pollux et le Chat Bleu was released in France by Disques Somethin' Else (presented by the French distributor Valoria Films).

On January 1, 1972, Music for Pleasure released an abridged LP record of the soundtrack of Dougal and the Blue Cat in stereo (the original mono soundtrack was electronically enhanced for stereo effect) and a single of three songs from the film ('Florence it's a Lovely Morning/Florence's Sad Song/Success! King Buxton') sung by Eric Thompson.

=== Track listing ===
No.	Title	Length
1.	"Le Réveil De La Forêt" (The Awakening of the Forest)	1:58
2.	"L'Intronisation De Ude" (The Enthronement of Ude/Buxton's Song)	2:05
3.	"La Complainte De La Grotte" (The Lament of the Cave)	2:32
4.	"La Chorale Des Sucettes" (The Lollipop Choir)	0:25
5.	"Coquine Comptine" (Naughty Nursery Rhyme/Florence, it's a lovely morning)	1:58
6.	"L'Hymne Aux Couleurs" (The Hymn to Colors)	1:06
7.	"Berceuse Pour Un Lit" (Lullaby for a Bed)	1:15
8.	"Symphonie Du Chat Bleu" (Symphony of the Blue Cat)	1:36
9.	"Le Bonjour De Pollux" (Pollux's Hello/Dougal's Hello)	2:51
10.	"La Complainte De Margotte" (Margotte's Complaint)	2:45
11.	"La Valse Des Couleurs" (The Waltz of Colors)	2:10
12.	"La Marche Des Martinets" (The March of the Swifts)	1:45
13.	"Rendez-Vous Au Manège" (Meet at the Riding School)	1:40
14.	"Promenade Des Sucettes" (Lollipop Walk)	0:53
15.	"Ballade Du Train" (Train Ride)	2:40
16.	"Tcha Tcha D'Ambroise" (Ambroise's Cha Cha)	2:25
17.	"Le Tango Du Bleu" (The Blue Tango)	1:20
Total length:		32:56

== Production ==
Production of the film took place from 1969 to 1970.

== Reception ==
Anton Bitel of Little White Lies wrote "Dougal and the Blue Cat offers considerable nostalgia for the middle-aged, plenty of lysergic visuals for the very young or the very high, and enough wittily topical lines and surreal digressions to charm just about anyone". Madeleine Harmsworth of Sunday Mirror called the film "Gentle and magical". Derek Malcolm of The Guardian wrote "This full-length puppet cartoon about a silly dog and a wicked cat is very well done in its way, which is not really mine". John Russell Taylor of The Times found the film "quite enchanting" as a mere grown-up.

== Adaptions ==
A novelization of the film written by Serge Danot was published in 1971 by Hachette Bibliothèque.

In 1972, a storybook of the film was published by Jane Carruth (24 pages). There was also another storybook adaptation released around the same time by Dean and Sons, which was a different, more kid-friendly retelling of the story with very little resemblance to the original film.

A scriptbook claiming to be the original screenplay of the film by Eric Thompson was published by Bloomsbury Publishing PLC in 1999 and features stills from the film.

== Home media ==
There has been a French VHS release by PolyGram/Universal in 1994 and a DVD release from said company.

PolyGram Video released the film on VHS in 1989 on their Channel 5 label. It was also re-released on the 4Front label in 1993 and by Second Sight films in 1999.

A restored and remastered print of Dougal and the Blue Cat was released on DVD in the UK on 1 November 2010. This release by Second Sight also features the original French version of the film Pollux et le Chat Bleu, interviews with Fenella Fielding, Phyllida Law and Emma Thompson, an overview by film critic Mark Kermode, and a photo gallery featuring the original cinema lobby cards of the French release.
