= Fenella Fielding =

English actress (1927–2018)

Fenella Fielding OBE
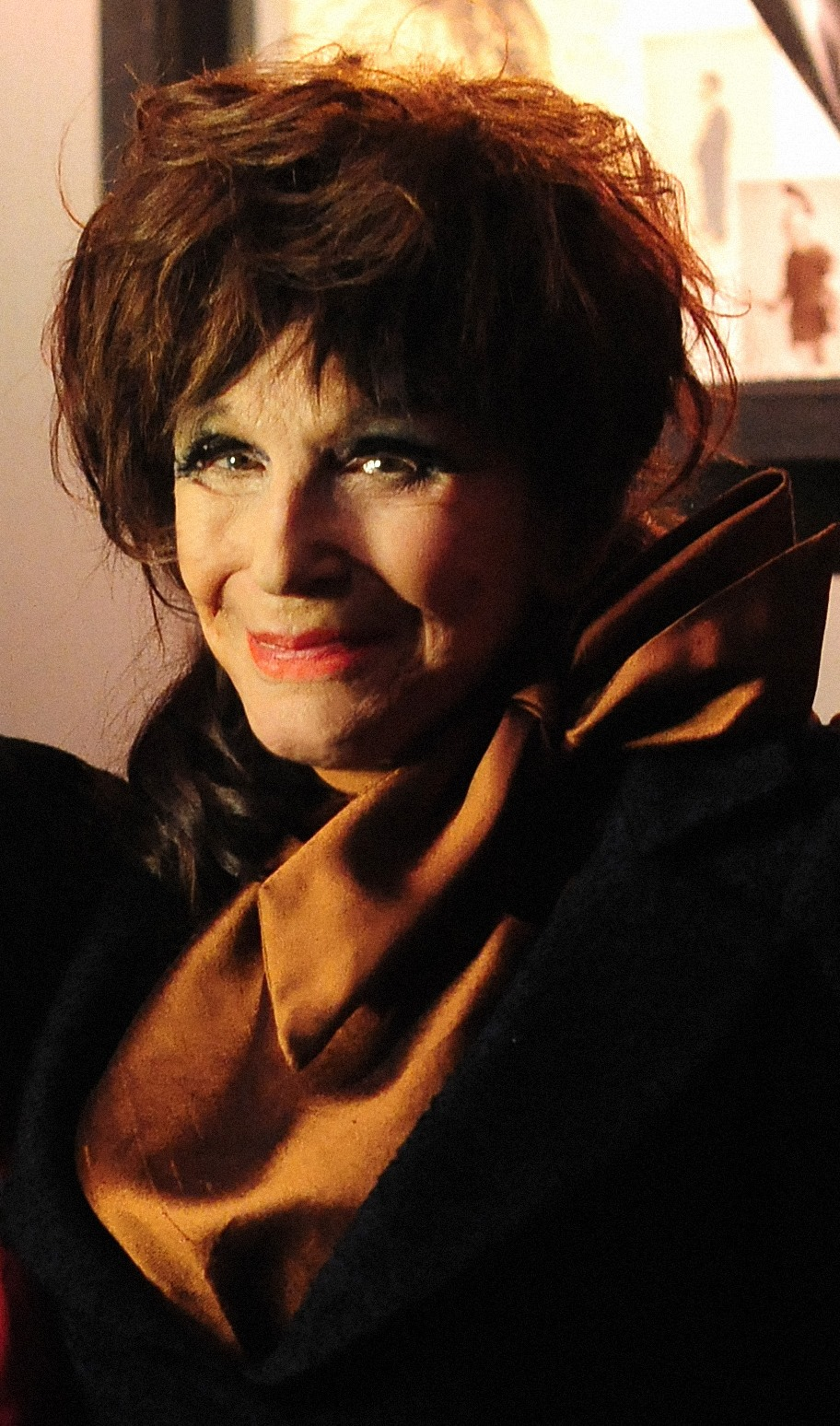
- Fenella Fielding on her 90th birthday in 2017
- Born: Fenella Marion Feldman; 17 November 1927; Whitechapel, London, England
- Died: 11 September 2018 (aged 90); Hammersmith, London, England
- Occupation: Actress
- Years active: 1952–2018
- Relatives: Basil Feldman, Baron Feldman (brother); Nick Feldman (nephew)
- Website: fenellafielding.com

Fenella Fielding (born Fenella Marion Feldman; 17 November 1927 – 11 September 2018) was an English stage, film and television actress who rose to prominence in the 1950s and 1960s, and was often referred to as "England's first lady of the double entendre". She was known for her seductive image and distinctively husky voice. Fielding appeared in two Carry On films, Carry On Regardless (1961) and Carry On Screaming! (1966).

== Early life and education ==
Fenella Marion Feldman was born on 17 November 1927 in Whitechapel, London, to a Romanian Jewish mother, Tilly (née Katz; 1902–1977), and a Lithuanian Jewish father, Philip Feldman.

She was the younger sister of Basil, later Baron Feldman. She grew up in Lower Clapton and later Edgware where she attended North London Collegiate School. She attended Madame Behenna’s dance school in Stamford Hill. Her father at one time managed a cinema in Silvertown, east London. She later resided in Chiswick, west London.

== Career ==
Fielding began her acting career in 1952, concentrating on stage productions, including the Bromley Little Theatre. She was given her first break when she accompanied the then-unknown actor Ron Moody to an audition (they had met in an amateur production at the London School of Economics). Her performance in Sandy Wilson's musical version of Valmouth made her a star in 1958. By 1959, she was appearing with Kenneth Williams in the comedy revue Pieces of Eight, written by Harold Pinter and Peter Cook. Fielding also guested in the Hancock's Half Hour episode "The Poetry Society" broadcast in December 1959. Between 1960 and 1962 Fielding played Janet Harris, a liberated secretary at an advertising firm, in the BBC radio sitcom Something to Shout About. In 1960, Fielding appeared as the Contessa in the final episode of the TV series The Four Just Men ("Treviso Dam").

Fielding later starred in her own television programme Izeena (1966). She had occasional guest appearances in television programmes such as The Avengers (after being passed over as Patrick Macnee's regular partner in favour of Honor Blackman) and in Danger Man. She appeared in four episodes of Morecambe and Wise Show between 1969 and 1972.

She had roles in two of the Carry On films; the first as Penny Panting in Carry On Regardless and the second as the vampish Valeria in Carry On Screaming ! (1966). She also appeared in three of the Doctor films, including Doctor in Clover. She interspersed these with performances in plays by Ibsen, Shakespeare and Henry James, reputedly keeping an edition of Plato's writings by her bed. Other theatre credits around this time included Sheridan and Chekhov. In 1977 she appeared on BBC TV's long running show, The Good Old Days performing 'Only A Glass of Champagne' and 'How'd You Like to Spoon with Me?'.

Fielding was the uncredited Village announcer in The Prisoner (1967–68), and co-starred with Tom Poston and Robert Morley in the remake of The Old Dark House (1963). In Dougal and the Blue Cat, based on The Magic Roundabout, she voiced the character of the Blue Voice, referred to as "Madam" by both Buxton (the blue cat of the title) and Dougal at various stages throughout the film. In the late 1960s, Fielding was approached by Federico Fellini to work on one of his films, but turned the work down because she was already booked to perform on stage at the Chichester Festival Theatre.

Fielding also starred in the children's television series Uncle Jack from 1990-1993 as the notorious villainess, the Vixen. In 1999, Fielding starred in Rik Mayall and Adrian Edmondson's film Guest House Paradiso. She toured in a production of Lady Windermere's Fan the same year. In 2011, Fielding appeared at the Jermyn Street Theatre, London in an English Chamber Theatre presentation of Jane McCulloch's Dearest Nancy, Darling Evelyn, the dramatised letters of Nancy Mitford and Evelyn Waugh.

From 2012, Fielding performed readings of English translations of Greek classics by David Stuttard. Her partners for this were Simon Russell Beale and later Stephen Greif. Her memoir was published in both audio and book form in 2017 and led to a number of appearances on stage reading extracts from it in places all over the UK.

Fielding was appointed Officer of the Order of the British Empire (OBE) in the 2018 Birthday Honours for services to drama and charity.

== Voice work ==
Fielding voiced “The Blue Voice” in the 1972 English adaptation of the 1970 French film ‘Dougal And The Blue Cat’, 'MOOD', the quirky supercomputer in the video game Martian Gothic in a script written by science fiction author Stephen Marley. After 2000, she recorded with Savoy, a book publishing and recording company. Her work with them includes readings of Colette, J. G. Ballard's Crash and T. S. Eliot's Four Quartets. She made an album of cover songs including Robbie Williams's "Angels", Kylie Minogue's "Can't Get You Out of My Head", New Order's "Blue Monday" and the White Stripes' "Passive Manipulation". In 2006, she toured Ireland in The Vagina Monologues. She provided the voice to two tracks on the Graham Roos album Quest. In the following years, Fielding was a regular guest contributor on BBC Radio 4's PM and Broadcasting House.

== Critical reception ==
A 2007 article in The Independent remarked that it was "one of the mysteries of British life that Fenella Fielding, whose wit and distinctive stage presence captivated figures such as Kenneth Tynan, Noël Coward and Federico Fellini, should have drifted into obscurity rather than being celebrated", and the same article quotes The Times as saying that Fielding's performance as Hedda Gabler was "one of the experiences of a lifetime". A 2017 article in The Guardian highlighted a career "renaissance in recent years" and describes Fielding as a phenomenal storyteller. "She reminds me of the great raconteur Quentin Crisp – the same love of language, mastery of its rhythms, perfectly formed sentences, and a joie de vivre even when relating her profound despair."

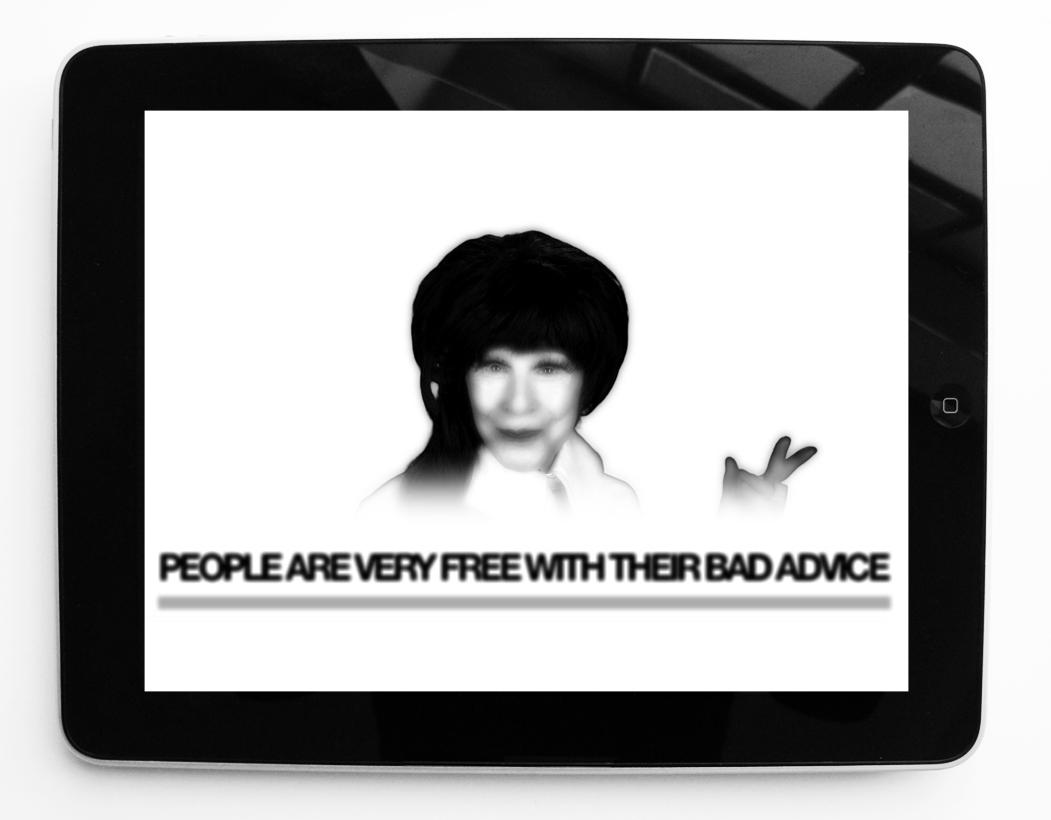
"People Are Very Free With Their Bad Advice...", a quote from Metafenella

Fielding is the subject of MetaFenella, a 2014 online artwork by artist Martin Firrell.

== Death ==
Fielding suffered a stroke on 25 August 2018 and died two weeks later at Charing Cross Hospital in Hammersmith, on 11 September 2018, aged 90. She never married nor had children.

== Filmography ==
=== Film ===
| Year | Title | Role | Notes |
|---|---|---|---|
| 1959 | Sapphire | Lingerie Shop Manageress | Uncredited |
| 1959 | Follow a Star | Lady Finchington | |
| 1960 | Doctor in Love | Mrs Tadwich | |
| 1960 | Foxhole in Cairo | Yvette | |
| 1961 | No Love for Johnnie | Sheilah | |
| 1961 | Carry On Regardless | Penny Panting | |
| 1961 | In the Doghouse | Miss Fordyce | |
| 1962 | Village of Daughters | Voice-Over | |
| 1963 | Doctor in Distress | Passenger on Train | |
| 1963 | The Old Dark House | Morgana Femm | |
| 1965 | How to Undress in Public Without Undue Embarrassment | Narrator | |
| 1966 | Doctor in Clover | Tatiana Rubikov | |
| 1966 | Carry On Screaming! | Valeria Watt | |
| 1966 | Drop Dead Darling | Fenella | |
| 1969 | Lock Up Your Daughters | Lady Eager | |
| 1972 | Dougal and the Blue Cat | The Blue Voice | Voice, Uncredited |
| 1974 | S*P*Y*S | Voice-over | Uncredited |
| 1977 | Cumbernauld Hit | Liana | |
| 1984 | The Zany Adventures of Robin Hood | Molly | |
| 1999 | Guest House Paradiso | Mrs Foxfur | |
| 2001 | Beginner's Luck | Mark's mum | |
| 2007 | The All Together | Mrs Cox | |
| 2007 | Wishbaby | Eve | |
| 2009 | Radio Mania | Mrs Langdon | |
| 2011 | Tincture of Vervain | Her Ladyship | |
| 2011 | Over the Edge | Mrs van Eisner | |
| 2016 | Surge of Power: Revenge of the Sequel | Fenella Fielding | |
| 2017 | Frankula | Voice-over | Voice |
| 2021 | The Curse of Minerva | Minerva | Posthumous release |

=== Television ===
| Year | Title | Role | Notes |
|---|---|---|---|
| 1957 | BBC Sunday-Night Theatre | Prostitute | Episode: "The Magnificent Egotist" |
| 1957 | Destination Downing Street | Djemila | 3 episodes |
| 1958 | Saturday Playhouse | Delia Mitchell | Episode: "Design for Murder" |
| 1959 | The Adventures of Brigadier Wellington-Bull | The Rajah's Wife | Episode: "A Spicy Dish" |
| 1960 | International Detective | Marcelle Clinton | Episode: "The Whitley Case" |
| 1960 | Armchair Theatre | Susi Flamberg | Episode: "Guardian Angel" |
| 1960 | The Four Just Men | The Contessa | Episode: "Treviso Dam" |
| 1960 | ITV Television Playhouse | Ernestine Lawrence | Episode: "Reprise" |
| 1960 | The Strange World of Gurney Slade | Caroline the Cow | Voice; Episode: #1.3 |
| 1960 | Danger Man | Hostess | Episode: "An Affair of State" |
| 1962 | Saki | Mary Drakmanton | All 8 episodes |
| 1963 | Mr Justice Duncannon | The Girl | Episode: "Trial and Error" |
| 1963 | Comedy Playhouse | Julie | Episode: "Comrades in Arms" |
| 1964 | The Avengers | Kim Lawrence | Episode: "The Charmers" |
| 1964 | Love Story | Celia | Episode: "Divorce, Divorce" |
| 1964 | Theatre 625 | Cleopatra | Episode: "The Ides of March" |
| 1964 | Armchair Theatre | Hon. Gwendolen Fairfax | Episode: "The Importance of Being Earnest" |
| 1965 | Drama 61-67 | Mrs Garfield | Episode: "Mrs. Quilley's Murder Shoes" |
| 1966 | Izeena | Izeena | All episodes |
| 1967 | The Prisoner | Loudspeaker Announcer | Voice; 7 episodes |
| 1968 | Ooh La La! | Various | 4 episodes |
| 1969 | A Touch of Venus | Marcella | Episode: "The Autograph" |
| 1971 | That's Your Funeral | Mrs Darling | Episode: "A Touch of Violet" |
| 1980 | Nobody's Perfect | Vivien | Episode: "Vivien's Problem" |
| 1981 | Cribb | Zena Prothero | Episode: "Mad Hatter's Holiday" |
| 1984 | The Zany Adventures of Robin Hood | Molly | TV film |
| 1985 | The Pickwick Papers | Mrs Leo Hunter | Episode: #1.4 |
| 1990–1993 | Uncle Jack | The Vixen | 18 episodes |
| 1999 | Doctor Who Night | Narration | Voice; Segment: "Carnival of Monsters" |
| 2004 | Abroad Again in Britain | Dearie | Voice; Episode: "Brighton Pavilion" |
| 2011 | The Legend of Dick and Dom | Lotte Lawoo | Episode: "Land of the Luvvies" |
| 2012 | Skins | Miriam Henley | Episode: "Alex" |
| 2019 | Conditions | Mother | Voice; all 13 episodes |

== Selected stage credits ==
| Year | Production | Role | Venue / notes |
|---|---|---|---|
| 1951 | What's New | — | Ciro's Nightclub (cabaret) |
| 1951 | Around the Town | — | Washington Hotel (cabaret) |
| 1952 | The High Bid | — | Bolton's Theatre – walk-on role |
| 1952 | Still Waters | — | Understudy |
| 1952 | Constant Lover | Evelyn | — |
| 1952 | Swing Back the Gate | — | Irving Theatre – revue |
| 1958, 1982 | Valmouth | Lady Parvula de Panzoust (1958), — (1982) | Saville Theatre, West End (1958), London (1982) |
| 1959 | Pieces of Eight | — | Apollo Theatre – revue with Kenneth Williams |
| 1960s | The Rivals | Lydia Languish | Various productions |
| 1960s | A Doll's House | Nora | Various productions |
| 1960s | Hedda Gabler | Hedda | Various productions |
| 1960s | The Importance of Being Earnest | Gwendolen Fairfax | Various productions |
| 1960s | Let's Get a Divorce | Cyprienne | Various productions |
| 1960s | Fallen Angels | Jane Banbury | Various productions |
| 1960s | An Ideal Husband | Lady Markby | Various productions |
| 1970 | Colette | — | Off-Broadway |
| 1999 | Lady Windermere's Fan | — | Touring production |
| 1990s–2000s | Blithe Spirit | Madame Arcati | Revival productions |
| 2011 | Dearest Nancy, Darling Evelyn | — | Jermyn Street Theatre |
| 2012–2018 | Readings of Greek classics | Performer | Various venues |
| 2010s | Do You Mind If I Smoke? | Solo performer | Touring autobiographical show |
