= Le Manège enchanté =

French children's television series

- Genre: Children's television series
- Created by: Serge Danot
- Written by: Serge Danot
- Voices of: Jacques Bodoin; Bernard Haller; Christian Riehl; Micheline Dax; Pascaline Priou; Patricia Danot; Serge Danot
- Theme music composer: Alain Legrand
- Country of origin: France
- Original language: French
- No. of series: 3
- No. of episodes: 500 approximate

Production
- Animator: Ivor Wood
- Running time: 5 minutes
- Production companies: Danot Production (1963–1967); AB Productions (1971–1990)

Original release
- Network: ORTF
- Release: October 5, 1964 – 1974
- Network: TF1 / La Cinq
- Release: January 7, 1990 – 1990

Related
- The Magic Roundabout

Le Manège enchanté (British English: "The Magic Roundabout", American English: "The Magic Carousel") is a French animated children's television series of hundreds of episodes each five minutes long, which premiered on October 5, 1964, on the first channel of the ORTF. Serge Danot created the series.

The series features characters in the make-believe land of Bois-Joli: Père Pivoine, the owner of the roundabout; Zébulon, a jack-in-the-box; Pollux the British dog; Azalée the cow; Ambroise the snail; Flappy the Spanish rabbit; Margote, a girl; and Jouvence Pio, a gardener who starts every sentence with "Hep Hep Hep".

The footage was used by the BBC to produce an English-language version, The Magic Roundabout, using scripts that bore little relation to the original story lines.

== Production ==
The programmes were created by stop motion animation with puppets used for the characters. The first season consisted of about 39 episodes. The initial episodes were filmed in black and white. After Danot's departure in 1967, a second series of 100 episodes was broadcast in 1971.

In 1989 another 250 episodes were produced by AB Groupe for the La Cinq channel.

== Voices ==
- Jacques Bodoin (in French): Pollux / Flappy / Ambroise / Zébulon (1963–1966)
- Bernard Haller (in French): Pollux (1966)
- Christian Riehl: Pollux (1966–1990)
- Micheline Dax: Azalée (1963–1966)
- Pascaline Priou: Azalée (1966–?)
- Patricia Danot: Margote (1963–1990)
- Serge Danot: Ambroise (1966–?)

== Films and revivals ==
- Dougal and the Blue Cat, French animated film directed by Serge Danot in 1972
- The Magic Roundabout, Franco-British animated film, released in 2005

The series was revived using computer animation. 52 episodes aired from September 2006 on Disney Junior and from 2 April 2006 on M6.

A new series will be produced by Mediawan (who acquired AB Groupe in 2017; whose previously produced the fourth season and remastered the previous three seasons including their English adaptation) through its animation subsidiary Method Animation alongside Jérôme Brizé's production company and rights to the franchise Magic! and was planned to release it for 2024 but has since been delayed to 2025. Method Animation's British animation studio Wildseed Studios which Mediawan Kids & Family had brought in 2023 joined the revival as co-producer in June 2025.

== See also ==
- List of French animated television series
