= Action Synthese =

French animation studio

- Type: Animation; Motion pictures Television
- Founded: 1998; 28 years ago
- Founders: Pascal and Laurent Rodon
- Defunct: March 25, 2013; 13 years ago
- Fate: Bankrupt
- Headquarters: Marseille, France

Action Synthese (or Studio Action Synthese) was a French animation studio founded by Pascal and Laurent Rodon in 1998, before being closed in 2013.

== History ==
The studio adopted a new version of the stop-motion TV series created by Serge Danot, The Magic Roundabout, in computer animation. The original series was successful between 1964 and 1977 in France and the United Kingdom. The 3D feature film was distributed in 2005 in Europe and the United States in 2006. The Magic Roundabout, a new TV series in 3D animation aimed at preschool children, has been broadcast since 2008 all over Europe (M6, Nickelodeon, ZDF, etc.).

In 2008 the studio was working on a movie based on the popular novel The Wizard of Oz by L. Frank Baum. The studio was later bankrupt around 2013.

== Filmography ==
=== Short films ===
- 1998 – Antebios
- 1999 – Premier domicile connu

=== Feature films ===
- 2005 – Doogal
- Cancelled - Untitled Wizard of Oz film
- Cancelled - Stupid Invaders (co-production with Xilam Animation)
- Cancelled - Doogal 2

=== Television series ===
- 2008-10 – The Magic Roundabout
- 2011 – City of Friends (season 2 + 2 specials)
