= Pyotr Anjou =

Russian naval officer and explorer (1796–1869)

Pyotr Fyodorovich Anjou
- Пётр Фёдорович Анжу
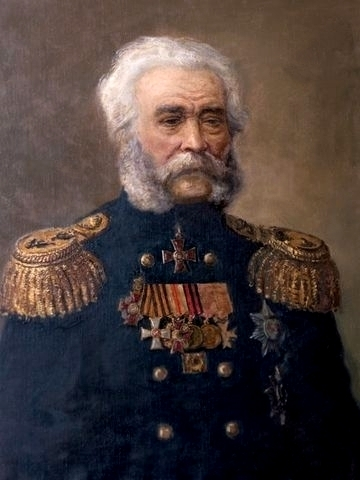
- Admiral Pyotr Anjou
- Born: February 15, 1796; Vyshny Volochyok, Russia
- Died: October 12, 1869 (aged 73); Saint Petersburg, Russia
- Military career
- Allegiance: Russia
- Branch: Imperial Russian Navy
- Service years: 1815–1865
- Rank: Admiral
- Conflicts: Greek War of Independence; Battle of Navarino; Russian conquest of Central Asia; Invasion of Turkestan
- Awards: Order of St. George

Pyotr Fyodorovich Anjou or Anzhu (Russian: Пётр Фёдорович Анжу; 26 February [O.S. 15 February] 1796 – 24 October [O.S. 12 October] 1869) was an Arctic explorer and an admiral of the Imperial Russian Navy.

== Background ==
Anjou's grandfather was a French Huguenot who entered the service of Russia in the middle of the 18th century. His father became a Russian citizen and worked as a doctor. Anjou was born in Vyshny Volochyok, near Tver. He graduated from the Marine Cadet Corps.

As a lieutenant, Anjou was given a task to describe the northern coast of Siberia in 1820. He and his assistants (P.Ilyin, I. Berezhnykh, and A. Figurin) described the coastline and the islands between the rivers Olenyok and Indigirka and made a map of the New Siberian Islands.

In 1825–1826, Anjou participated in describing the northeastern coast of the Caspian Sea and the western coast of the Aral Sea. He distinguished himself in the Battle of Navarino as a lieutenant of the line of battle ship "Gangut".

Later on, he held a few commanding posts and also served in administrative and scientific establishments of the Russian Admiralty. One of the groups of the New Siberian Islands bears Anjou's name (the Anjou Islands).

== Family ==
In October 1828, Anjou married Ksenia Ivanovna Loginova (24 January 1807 (O.S.) - 1870); she was the adoptive daughter of Admiral Pyotr Rikord, the Russian governor of Kamchatka. In January 1822, she had married the explorer John Dundas Cochrane, and travelled back to London with him. But he died in South America in August 1825, and in 1827 Ksenia returned to Russia. Anjou and Ksenia had six children, one of whom (also named Pyotr, b.1836) was later an Arctic explorer in his own right.
