= Northern Regions =

1825 book

- Author: Anonymous
- Genre: Childrens, Adventure
- Published: London, England
- Publisher: John Harris
- Publication date: 1825
- Publication place: United Kingdom
- Media type: Book

Northern Regions; Or, A Relation of Uncle Richard's Voyages for the Discovery of a North-west Passage is a children's adventure novel published in 1825 by John Harris that recounts four British Arctic expeditions from the early 19th century. Written by an anonymous author, the stories in the book are fictionalized accounts of real events.

== Plot ==
Northern Regions centers on Uncle Richard, an English naval officer, who returns from polar exploration and shares stories with his niece Louisa and nephews Tom and Charles. The children gradually become more involved, especially Tom, who eventually narrates the final story himself. The four main expeditions are Captain William Edward Parry’s first sea expedition (1819–20), told by Uncle Richard, Captain John Franklin’s overland Coppermine River expedition (1819–21), told by the children’s father, Parry’s second expedition (1821–23), again told by Richard, with a focus on his time living with Inuit communities, and finally Captain John Dundas Cochrane's solo journey across Siberia (1820–23), told by Tom.

Professor Erika Behrisch Elce noted that the book's plot was both typical and subversive of 19th-century imperial children’s literature, with some stories depicting heroes as childlike along with portraying cultural exchange as crucial for survival.

== Reception ==
Upon its publication, the book was a commercial success and quickly gained popularity, leading to reprints the following year in both the United Kingdom and the United States. Northern Regions was primarily targeted towards a younger male audience and was referred to by Stuart Hannabuss “inspiring [to] new generations of young men”. The book's author wrote that it was also directed at parents as a possible tool to help children understand British patriotism.

Contemporary reviewers, such as Gail Edwards and Judith Saltman, expressed the belief that "...while the narrative aspires to present young readers with factual information, rather than 'an overdrawn picture... calculated merely for their amusement, and exciting an unhealthy taste for the marvelous and the fictitious,' the illustrations are far more imaginative in their attempt to interpret the text," with unrealistic drawings taking away from the narrative.

=== Authorship ===
The book was published anonymously in 1825 as part of John Harris's series of children's books under the umbrella of “Harris’s Instructive and Amusing Publications”. Some scholars, such as Erika Behrisch Elce and Cinda Pippenger, have theorized that the text's actual author is Jehoshaphat Aspin; a woman who contributed to many of Harris's works and draw the map on the book's cover.
