= Eric Thompson =

English actor (1929–1982)

- Thompson in .c 1970
- Born: Eric Norman Thompson; 9 November 1929; Sleaford, Lincolnshire, England
- Died: 30 November 1982 (aged 53); London Borough of Camden, England
- Spouse: Phyllida Law (m. 1957)
- Children: Emma; Sophie

Eric Norman Thompson (9 November 1929 – 30 November 1982) was an English actor, scriptwriter and stage director. He is best remembered for creating and performing the English narration for The Magic Roundabout, which he adapted from the original French Le Manège enchanté.

== Early life ==
Eric Norman Thompson was born on 9 November 1929 in Sleaford, Lincolnshire, England, the son of Annie (née Jackson) and George Henry Thompson, a hotel waiter, and grew up in Rudgwick, Sussex, attending Collyer's School, Horsham. He trained to be an actor at the Old Vic acting school in London and joined the Old Vic theatre company in 1952.

== Career ==
Thompson worked regularly for the BBC, and was a presenter of the children's television programme Play School from 1964 to 1967. He was best known as the narrator of The Magic Roundabout, for which he also wrote the English language scripts, using the visuals from the original French Le Manège enchanté. These were transmitted from October 1965 to January 1977. Thompson rarely worked in television after his voice became well known, but occasionally appeared in programmes including Doctor Finlay's Casebook (episode: "Beware of the Dog"), Z Cars (episode: "Fun and Games") in 1964, Doctor Who in the serial The Massacre of St Bartholomew's Eve in 1966, and in two episodes of Coronation Street, in 1964 and 1969 (playing two different characters).

== Personal life and death ==
Thompson married Scottish actress Phyllida Law (1932−2026), whom he met while at the Old Vic in 1957. Their daughters Emma and Sophie Thompson followed their parents into acting.

In 1967, he had a heart attack, attributed to overwork and heavy smoking, and he therefore changed his focus to directing. He directed Kenneth Williams in My Fat Friend in 1972 and the conflicts between the two are extensively discussed in Williams' diaries.

Thompson died of a heart attack in London on 30 November 1982, aged 53.

== Selected filmography ==
Year	Title	Role	Notes
1951	Pool of London	Garage Pump Attendant	Uncredited
1957	Lucky Jim	Student	Uncredited
1962	Private Potter	Capt. John Knowles	
1963	The Barber of Stamford Hill	1st Customer	
1967	The Jokers	Customs Officer	
1970	One Day in the Life of Ivan Denisovich	Tsetzar	
1970	Dougal and The Blue Cat (Pollux et Le Chat Bleu)	Narrator / Dougal / Florence / Brian / Zebedee / Dylan / Mr Rusty / Mr Machenry / Ermintrude / The Train	Voice
