= The Magic Roundabout (film) =

2005 animated film

- British theatrical release poster
- French: Pollux – Le manège enchanté
- Directed by: Jean Duval; Frank Passingham; Dave Borthwick
- Screenplay by: Paul Bassett Davies; Tad Safran (Note: Credited with "additional writing by"); Raolf Sanoussi (Note: Credited under "co-writers"); Stephane Sanoussi
- Based on: Characters by: Serge Danot; Martine Danot
- Produced by: Laurent Rodon; Pascal Rodon; Claude Gorsky
- Starring: Tom Baker; Jim Broadbent; Lee Evans; Joanna Lumley; Ian McKellen; Kylie Minogue; Bill Nighy; Robbie Williams; Ray Winstone
- Edited by: Mathieu Morfin
- Music by: Mark Thomas
- Production companies: Action Synthese; UK Film Council; Pathé Renn Productions; Pricel; France 2 Cinéma; Canal+; Les Films Action; SPZ Entertainment; bolexbrothers limited
- Distributed by: Pathé Distribution
- Release dates: 2 February 2005 (France); 11 February 2005 (United Kingdom)
- Running time: 82 minutes
- Countries: United Kingdom; France
- Languages: English; French
- Budget: $20 million
- Box office: $26.7 million

The Magic Roundabout (also known as Sprung! The Magic Roundabout; French: Pollux – Le manège enchanté) is a 2005 animated adventure fantasy comedy film based on the television series of the same name. Unlike the show, which was presented with stop-motion animation, the film utilizes computer-generated animation. The story sees a group of unlikely heroes who go on a quest to stop a reawakened villain, who intends on freezing the world, from retrieving a set of powerful diamonds.

The film was released in France with a French dub on 2 February 2005 and an English-language version was released nine days later in the United Kingdom on 11 February. In the United States, the film was released as Doogal on 24 February 2006 with a new English cast, dub, and script. Only Ian McKellen's performance was retained, while Kylie Minogue redubbed her role from the UK release. The French and UK versions received mixed reviews, while the American version was critically panned.

== Plot ==
Dougal, a well-meaning, yet greedy Skye Terrier, places a nail in the road to spike a sweets cart's tyre, intending to enjoy the sweets himself. When the driver leaves to seek help, Dougal inadvertently crashes the cart into the roof of the village's Magic Roundabout. The resulting explosion damages the structure, causing it spin uncontrollably until an ice wizard flies out and freezes it solid, trapping repairman Mr Rusty, Dougal's young owner Florence, and two other children, Coral and Basil inside an icy prison. Alarmed, Dougal joins his friends - Brian the cynical snail, Ermintrude the opera-singing cow and Dylan the hippie rabbit- in summoning Zebedee, a jack-in-the-box-like wizard, for help.

Zebedee explains that the roundabout served as a barrier to keep his evil counterpart, Zeebad, imprisoned and to prevent him from freezing the world as he once did before. Now that Zeebad is free, he can work his icy magic again. To stop him, three enchanted diamonds must be slotted into the roundabout to re-imprison Zeebad and reverse his magic. If Zeebad claims them first however, he will use them to freeze the sun. One diamond is said to be hidden on the roundabout while the other two are located far beyond the village. Zebedee sends Dougal and his friends aboard Train, a magical locomotive, to find them. After escaping, Zeebad comes across a Foot Guard animatronic named Soldier Sam, catapulted from the roundabout when it froze, and brings him to life to help him search for the diamonds. That night, while the gang camps in the mountains, Dougal wanders off and is suddenly abducted by Zeebad. Guided by a European moose, the gang finds Zeebad's lair, where Ermintrude frees Dougal from captivity. Zeebad gives chase, but Zebedee arrives to face him in a duel. In the end, Zeebad defeats him, freezing Zebedee on a cliff and causing it to collapse, sending him plunging into the abyss.

Though saddened, Dougal and his friends press on to retrieve the diamonds from a volcano edged with lava and an ancient temple guarded by evil skeletons. But Zeebad seizes them, leaving the gang's only hope of stopping Zeebad by reaching the roundabout first. Aboard Train, they are pursued by Zeebad in a drill-like locomotive and overhears their plan. Crashing into a buffer stop, they are launched into the snow, injuring Train, and forcing them to leave him behind as they trek back to the village through the freezing wasteland. Zeebad, after abandoning an injured Sam in the snow, arrives at the now-frozen village ahead of them, but unable to find the third diamond. Realising his true duty is to guard the roundabout, Sam rides in on the moose to face Zeebad, but is overpowered and fatally wounded. Discovering that Sam was part of the roundabout, Zeebad learns that the diamond is hidden within him, and removes it, ending Sam's life.

As Zeebad begins to freeze the sun with the three diamonds, the gang rushes back to the village, reclaiming the diamonds and placing them on the roundabout until only the third diamond remains. Zeebad snatches it back, seemingly reclaiming his victory, but a healed Train arrives just in time to knock it free, giving Dougal the chance to redeem himself by slotting it on the roundabout. The diamonds' power re-imprisons Zeebad, thaws the world and the sun, and restores the Magic Roundabout. Zebedee, having survived the fall, reunites with his friends. Those trapped on the roundabout are freed, and Dougal revives a comatose Florence. When they try to ride again on the roundabout, they find that it is non-functional due to Sam being deceased. Zebedee restores Sam to his inanimate form, returns him on the roundabout which now functions again. Dougal comes to understand the true value of friendship, along with selflessness, courage, and humility.

== Voice cast ==
Character	France	United Kingdom (original)	United States (Doogal)
Pollux/Dougal/Doogal	Henri Salvador	Robbie Williams	Daniel Tay
Margote/Florence	Vanessa Paradis	Kylie Minogue	Kylie Minogue
Zabadie/Zeebad	Michel Galabru	Tom Baker	Jon Stewart
Ambroise/Brian	Dany Boon	Jim Broadbent	William H. Macy
Train	N/A	Lee Evans	Chevy Chase
Azalée/Ermintrude	Valérie Lemercier	Joanna Lumley	Whoopi Goldberg
Flappy/Dylan	Eddy Mitchell	Bill Nighy	Jimmy Fallon
Soldier Sam	Gérard Jugnot	Ray Winstone	Bill Hader
Zébulon/Zebedee	Élie Semoun	Ian McKellen	Ian McKellen
Elk/Moose	N/A	N/A	Kevin Smith
Narrator	N/A	N/A	Judi Dench
Basil	Unknown	Ediz Mahmut	Eric Robinson
Coral	Unknown	Daniella Loftus	Heidi Brook Myers
Mr Rusty	Unknown	Jimmy Hibbert	Cory Edwards
Mr Grimsdale	Unknown	Jimmy Hibbert	John Krasinski
Skeleton Guards	Unknown	Jimmy Hibbert	Cory Edwards; John Krasinski

== Production ==
=== Development ===
In 2000, Andy Leighton started working as a managing director at bolexbrothers. There he learned that the studio's financial income was drying up, and decided to start building a feature film slate. Associate producer Bruce Higham had a link with Kodak and was friends with Nick Collinson, who worked for Canal+. Collinson told Higham that Pathé were one of the big successful French companies in terms of film distribution and financing, so Higham, in turn, mentioned this to bolexbrothers. Director Pascal Rodon of Action Synthese in Marseille and producer Laurent Rodon of Les Films Action in Paris had acquired the rights through Serge Danot's wife Martine to produce a film adaptation of The Magic Roundabout. The Rodon brothers had not done any films before and needed someone to do the storyboards and script, so they turned to director and editor Dave Borthwick, actor and writer Paul Bassett Davies and Leighton. The show was a huge hit in France and the United Kingdom, so they were looking for a UK partner, which led to Leighton having meetings with Pathé UK. Leighton got in touch with Trevor Horn's wife Jill Sinclair and told her that bolexbrothers was making the film, at which she joined in as an executive producer. With more than 140 people contributing, the development started in May 2000 and lasted until December 2001. Around the same time, Action Synthese decided to wait until they had developed all the characters along with the animation tests before they managed to get Pathé to finance the film production. Pascal Rodon described Pathé's financing of the production as, "A perfect fit. They are the biggest cinema owner in Europe with about 60 percent of French cinemas, and have interests in the UK."

During 2002, the film was in pre-production until the actual production commenced and lasted for 33 months. According to Leighton, the film had a slightly darker tone than the show; bolexbrothers wanted to take the action away from the Magic Garden, with their story starting there, but then having the characters go on a globe-trotting adventure around the world. Raoff and Stephane Sanoussi made an attempt to write a story for the film. Because they did not have any experience of writing extended narratives, their first script was strongly reminiscent of the show's usual 3-5-minute episode format. Davies was hired and brought in to help develop the narrative. When he first went over to Paris for a week, he and the Sanoussi brothers got along well. At one point, they were asked to create a backstory for the film. Davies began to contribute his ideas, and because of the Sanoussis' inability to do extended narratives, someone suggested that they create an origin story for Zebedee. So Davies and the Sanoussis created two characters for the film, Zeebad and Soldier Sam. Nobody asked the writers if they were going to make the film for children or acknowledge that it would appeal to adults like the show. This was because a lot of animated films in the 2000s, such as DreamWorks Pictures' Shrek and Disney and Pixar's Monsters, Inc., attempted to hit two demographics to include elements that would appeal to both adults and children. However, the producers at Pathé UK, including Tad Safran, asked Davies to write a draft of the script. Davies wrote three drafts, removing the narrative structure of the original script before other people were brought in to polish it off. The Sanoussi brothers disliked this because it was not their vision. The film adaption was done by French producer Jean-Pierre Carasso. Davies stated, "Essentially, Pathé UK and all the other producers had to do a certain amount of mollifying to various parties, by giving the people a credit. And gradually, over the course of a year, they became disillusioned, they became hostile towards me. Probably with reason, because... as a kind of representative of everything that was coming in and taking their project away from them. And that's the result when suddenly the budget goes into the millions and millions."

Borthwick was hired to oversee the storyboards and scripts, but went through a personal crisis during the pre-production and was sidelined as a result. The producers at Pathé UK lost confidence in him, so Borthwick brought in his student Frank Passingham, who took over. Les Films Action also hired Jean Duval to create and supervise their graphic charter for the development of future Magic Roundabout productions. At the end of 2003, Laurent Rodon asked Duval to participate in the final storyboard of the film. Duval went to Marseille, where he met Pascal Rodon. In 2004, the Rodon brothers offered him the position of co-director.

=== Animation ===
Unlike the show, which was presented with stop-motion animation, the film was mainly animated in computer-generated animation, which Pascal Rodon was very much into. Whereas British animators and studios such as bolexbrothers specialised in stop-motion or traditional animation, Paris was, in Leighton's words, "kind of the leaders [of computer animation]", since they had about three or four universities that were teaching it, being more advanced than the UK was. Based in Bristol, bolexbrothers had a good reputation for their awards that they had won at film festivals with their short films, commercials and their previous feature film, The Secret Adventures of Tom Thumb. According to Frédéric Bonometti, the director of animation, the animators chose to animate the characters with key-framing instead of motion capture as they did not want the animation to be too close to reality, and they used real movements as inspiration when animating the characters. They first started using 3D Studio MAX, although it was used to develop the characters, but the interface was not fast enough for the animators as they struggled to animate. Instead, they chose to switch to Softimage XSI which was much easier for the animators in working conditions and saving time in development.

When animating the hair for the characters and Dougal's fur, the animators first tried the envelope tool, then used the Hairs Dynamic in XSI. They used this technique for Dylan's tuffs of hair, but abandoned it mostly due to it causing technical problems. The animators also developed a mesh that served as a deformation cage for the characters' hair, used for Florence's hair and Coral's pigtails. Because Florence's skirt and Coral's dress were the only clothes that required animation, the animators did not use a clothing simulator, instead using a series of bones in rotation around the skirt which deformed it via envelope tool and automatically calculated when the dress collided with the legs. For special effects such as explosions, smoke and clouds, the animators used simple geometrical shapes as placeholders and reference points in space and time for the effect specialists. As the animation was being made and rendered in Softimage XSI on the hardware provided by Hewlett-Packard, Avid Technology participated with Softimage to help with the animation and rendering of Dougal's fur. Les Films Action relied on Avid during the animation and rendering process.

=== Casting ===
Casting was done by John and Ros Hubbard and Leighton. The French voices were provided by Henri Salvador, Vanessa Paradis, Michel Galabru, Eddy Mitchell, Gérard Jugnot, Dany Boon, Élie Semoun and Valérie Lemercier. The English voice cast included Robbie Williams, Kylie Minogue, Richard O'Brien (later replaced with Ian McKellen), Joanna Lumley, Bill Nighy, Tom Baker, Jim Broadbent, Ray Winstone, Lee Evans, Ediz Mahmut, Daniella Loftus and Jimmy Hibbert. Because they all knew of the show (except McKellen), they were extremely motivated and enthusiastic. Due to his busy schedule and travels between London and France, Duval had to delegate some of the recording sessions with the actors and was not able to work with Paradis.

=== Soundtrack ===
Trevor Horn was involved in the beginning of the film's production as a producer, but the film eventually became a vehicle for a lot of "bubblegum pop records" to which Horn owned the publishing rights. According to Leighton, "My big disappointment was they couldn't get the music together. I think because it landed again in Trevor Horn's lap but he was still producing other things."

The film's soundtrack was composed by Mark Thomas. James L. Venable and John M. Davis composed additional scores for the American version. The songs in the film include:

- "The Magic Roundabout" by Andrea Remanda and Goldust Productions, performed by Kylie Minogue, Andrea Remanda and Scaramanga X, with additional vocals by Steve Anderson
- "Magic by Pilot*
- "You Really Got Me" by the Kinks, performed by Bill Nighy and Catherine Bott**
- "Lean Mean Fighting Machine" by Andrea Remanda and Goldust Productions, performed by Andrea Remanda, Scaramanga X and R. Driscoll
- "Spinning" by Andrea Remanda and Goldust Productions, performed by Andrea Remanda and Scaramanga X
- "Simply Wonderful" by Andrea Remanda and Goldust Productions, performed by Andrea Remanda and Scaramanga X
- "Mr. Blue Sky" by the Electric Light Orchestra, with additional vocals by Catherine Bott
- "Toreador Song" by Georges Bizet, performed by Catherine Bott, Arthur Dick and Mark Thomas**
- "The What-a-Snails Waltz" by Mark Thomas
- "Believe Yourself" by Andrea Remanda and Goldust Productions, performed by Andrea Remanda and Scaramanga X
- "Bust This Joint" by Andrea Remanda and Goldust Productions, performed by Andrea Remanda, Scaramanga X and R. Driscoll
- "Also Sprach Zarathustra" by Richard Strauss*
- "I Love To Boogie" by T. Rex*
- "Sugar, Sugar" by The Archies*
- "In the Hall of the Mountain King" by Edvard Grieg*

(*) Denotes licensed songs. (**) Denotes arrangement of song.

== Release ==
Pathé was responsible for international sales and on 18 October 2004, Miramax Films acquired the distribution rights for North America and Latin America. However, the rights would later transfer to The Weinstein Company which led into the production of the American adaptation titled Doogal.

== Reception ==
On Rotten Tomatoes, the UK version of the film received an aggregate score of 50% based on six reviews, with an average score of 5.1/10. Joe Utichi of FilmFocus wrote: "For all its undeniable promise, this take on The Magic Roundabout is just plain disastrous in its execution." Stella Papamichael of BBC Online stated that "the story isn't inherently funny, relevant, or convincing. Essentially it's too 'dumbed down', tragically bypassing the cheeky 60s subtext of the original TV show and sapping its nostalgia value". Time Out wrote: "The story's clearly aimed at the Teletubbies fraternity who would never question a scenario as ridiculous as this ... granted, the level of computer animation isn't exactly state-of-the-art, but it's certainly florid enough to captivate undemanding five-year-olds ... Robbie Williams and Bill Nighy's stoned rabbit help transform what should have been an unendurable fiasco into an, albeit forgettable, treat for toddlers. And toddlers only. Total Film included it on the list of the 50 Worst Kids Movies Ever Made, calling it a "CGI flick that pretty much destroyed a generation's childhood memories". Derek Malcolm of the Evening Standard gave the film two stars out of five, saying that "it's funny, shrewd, well-animated and has the right voices to match the visuals", but otherwise "struggles to fill 82 minutes". Paul Byrne of Dublin's Evening Herald gave the film two out of five stars, calling it "one for the little 'uns only. Everyone else should just get the original series on DVD." James Christopher of The Times gave the film two out of five stars, saying that "the entire fiasco is designed to please ageing nerds and rehab parents. Peter Bradshaw of The Guardian said that "the stop-motion kids' animation classic from the 1960s and 70s here loses its innocence in spectacular, and spectacularly tiresome style" in his two-star review. Anthony Quinn of The Independent gave the film one star out of five and said that "anyone hoping to trip down TV's memory lane and revisit the eccentric stop-motion series of old will be disappointed. The roundabout has been revamped, and whatever magic there was has gone missing. In its place is a frantic cartoon adventure whose main selling-point is the celebrity voiceovers [...] The plot rips off The Lord of the Rings, pitting Ian McKellen's Zebedee against Tom Baker's evil twin Zeebad, but no amount of in jokery can salvage this wreck."

Conversely, Sukhdev Sandhu of The Daily Telegraph called it "a bright and surprisingly likeable update of the cult 1960s cartoon [that] looks a treat [and] doesn't overstay its welcome." William Thomas of Empire wrote: "this version is far slicker and attempts a bit of Hollywood-style action-adventure grandstanding, but it works both as a trip down memory lane and as an entertaining movie for (very) young children".

== Doogal (United States) ==
American theatrical release poster

As reported by William H. Macy, Harvey Weinstein saw The Magic Roundabout and decided to produce an American localized version. On 24 February 2006, the film was released in the United States as Doogal and was distributed by the Weinstein Company. The majority of the British cast's voice work was dubbed by American celebrities such as Chevy Chase (Train), Jimmy Fallon (Dylan), Whoopi Goldberg (Ermintrude), Bill Hader (Soldier Sam), Macy (Brian), and Jon Stewart (Zeebad). Child actor Daniel Tay (American Splendor) plays the titular character in the United States dub. The U.S. screenplay adaptation was handled by Butch Hartman; the original script was heavily revised via the addition of numerous references to popular culture. Hartman would later reveal in 2017 during the Weinstein scandal that most of his input was rewritten and rerecorded, and said of his writing in the final film that he "had maybe 3% to do with".

Only two original voices remained, those of Kylie Minogue and Ian McKellen. Minogue, however, re-voiced her own lines with an American accent. The United States version also features Kevin Smith as the voice of Moose, who was originally a non-speaking character, and adds narration by Judi Dench.

=== Reception ===
The US version of the film was not screened for critics, and was panned by those who saw it. On Rotten Tomatoes, the film has an aggregate score of 9% based on 47 reviews. The consensus reads: "Overloaded with pop culture references, but lacking in compelling characters and plot, Doogal is too simple-minded even for the kiddies". Metacritic gave the film an average score of 23 out of 100, based on 14 critics, indicating "generally unfavorable reviews". Screen Rant ranked it number 1 on its list of the twelve Worst animated movies ever made.

Roger Moore of Orlando Sentinel described it as "easily the worst kid's movie since Spy Kids 3-D, a confusing blur of a magical quest based on an ancient British stop-motion animation TV show." Christy Lemire of Associated Press called it "the laziest, most disheartening animated children's film ever made." Randy Miller of DVD Talk called it "one of the worst excuses for a children's film during this or any year ... Filled to the brim with pop culture references and other such gags that'll be even less funny a few years from now, it's like Shrek without the occasional bit of charm and surprise". Michael Phillips of the Chicago Tribune described the film as "Eighty-five minutes you'll never get back", and also put it at No. 5 on his Worst of 2006 list. Frank Scheck of The Hollywood Reporter wrote, "The key frame animation, based on three-dimensional models, is rudimentary, with none of the characters proving visually arresting." Neil Genzlinger of The New York Times wrote, "In Doogal setting the world right again involves a badly paced quest for three diamonds, assorted jokes that don't land, and a daringly incoherent climactic confrontation." Jami Bernard of the New York Daily News called it "a dreadful animated movie stuffed with bad puns and little internal logic", adding that "without the famous voice cast, it has little to offer except enough whimsy to burn a hole through your stomach lining." Louise Kennedy of The Boston Globe said that it "offers boredom and irritation for parents, needlessly scary images for tots, and, for the pubescent boys who apparently run mass culture, a flatulent blue moose. It's ugly to look at, too." Peter Hartlaub of the San Francisco Chronicle wrote that "the computer animation in Doogal is subpar and at times seems incomplete, with mouths that don't quite match the voices, kind of like the dubbing in the first Mad Max movie or maybe Rumble in the Bronx. But worse yet, the movie wastes the talent that it does have, forcing several of our greatest actors to plow through recycled gags and a sorry story line that doesn't even have the energy to offer much of a moral lesson at the end." Scott Brown of Entertainment Weekly gave the film an F grade and said that "Doogal is not, as you might surmise, some bizarre Scottish delicacy, but an animated movie designed with very young children in mind. And very young children should be very angry about that. Where is it written that 4-year-olds don't deserve a good story, decent characters, and a modicum of coherence? [...] Weaning toddlers on this kind of lazy garbage — where retired pop-culture references are passed off as in-jokes for parents, where flatulence gags verge on the compulsive, where the CG lips don't even match the freaking words — can only produce a generation more addled than the last, if that's possible." Peter Howell, in his one-star review for The Toronto Star, remarked that "in attempting to turn a tiny Anglo-Franco amusement into a full-blown Yankee extravaganza, The Weinstein Co. has managed to choke every last bit of charm out of the characters and their setting, no mean feat for a show this enchanting." Mark Olsen of LA Weekly said "the story, dialogue and animation here really are for-kids-only." John Monaghan of the Detroit Free Press called it "the last resort for desperate parents who have already seen Curious George and need to get the kids out of the house."

Audiences polled by CinemaScore gave the film an average grade of "B−" on an A+ to F scale.

== Accolades ==
Year	Award	Category	Recipients	Result	Ref.
2007	Stinkers Bad Movie Awards	Worst Supporting Actor	Chevy Chase (also for Zoom)	Won	
2007	Stinkers Bad Movie Awards	Foulest Family Film	Doogal (TWC)	Nominated	
2007	Stinkers Bad Movie Awards	Worst Animated Film	Doogal (TWC)	Won	

== Home media ==
The Magic Roundabout was released on DVD and VHS in the UK on 18 July 2005 by 20th Century Fox Home Entertainment (under Pathé). The DVD release included the option to play along with the film via a "Magical Mysteries Quiz Game" in which, at certain intervals, the viewer would answer questions relating to what they have seen; Tom Baker would provide narration during the game. Two questions had to be answered correctly at a time before the film could continue, with an aim to see how many questions the viewer can get right first time. The game could be played under two difficulties; "Starter" to get the viewer started, and "Smarter" which was slightly more difficult. The film was later re-released on a 2-disc Special Edition DVD with extra bonus material that includes an inside look at the history of the original 1964 series, two making-of featurettes, classic episodes of the original series in both English and French, design gallery, cast and crew biographies, theatrical trailer and a couple TV spots.

In 2006, 20th Century Fox Home Entertainment released a 3-movie DVD pack that contains The Magic Roundabout, Chicken Run and Robots.

The American version of the film, Doogal, was released on a double-sided DVD on 16 May 2006 by The Weinstein Company containing both the fullscreen and widescreen versions on each side.

In Canada, the country's distributor, Alliance Atlantis, released the American version of the film nationally. The Quebec release contains the European French language track (despite the country using a completely different French accent there).

In 2008, The Magic Roundabout was released on Blu-ray exclusively in France featuring both the French and original English versions. Despite being sourced from a 2K English master, selecting the French audio track (or using the angle option) would show the credits in French sourced in its original DVD release, hence the low quality during them.

A couple years later, the Blu-ray was re-released as part of Fox Pathé Europa's "Sélection Blu-VIP" service where it contained a DVD copy of the film (in a plastic sleeve) as well as a booklet including a catalog of Blu-ray releases from 20th Century Fox, Pathé, Metro-Goldwyn-Mayer and EuropaCorp, along with a code on the back of it which could be used on the now-defunct 'Le Club BLU-VIP' website to earn points for merchandise for films released at the time (à la Disney Movie Rewards).

== Cancelled sequel ==
Before the film was released, a sequel to The Magic Roundabout was announced to be in development, with the voice cast expected to reprise their roles. However, Action Synthese closed their doors in 2013, effectively ending any chances of a sequel being made.
