= Jackie Cochran =

Jackie Cochran may refer to:

- Jacqueline Cochran (1906–1980), female pioneer American aviator
- Jackie Lee Cochran (1934–1998), male American rockabilly musician

== See also ==
- John Cochran (disambiguation)
