= Thomas Elsbeth =

German composer

Thomas Elsbeth (? – after 1624) was a German composer.

Details of Elsbeth's life are few and vague. Elsbeth was born in Neustadt, Franconia; his birth date is totally unknown, although he did refer to himself as "poor and old" in 1616. Since his early publications were issued in Frankfurt an der Oder, he is thought to have been an acquaintance of Bartholomäus Gesius, the kantor there. He may have attended Viadrina University in Frankfurt, though modern scholars have been unable to substantiate this with archival research. He dedicated a publication to the city councilmen of Breslau, and may have spent time there. He also published several books of works in Liegnitz after 1606, and so it is probable that he lived there for some time. However, he is not listed in any of the surviving city payrolls. He is presumed to have lived in Jauer from 1616, and probably died there in or after 1624, the date of his last publications.

Elsbeth left a significant body of extant motets and songs. Elsbeth's songs, of which there are about 100, are for three to five voices; some are in a homophonic style and others are set in a polyphonic chorale style. He never took up use of the basso continuo, despite its increasing popularity via Italy in the beginning of the 17th century. Of about 150 motets, most of the early works are in Latin and most of the later in German. His Evangelien collections are calendrical settings of the Gospels, which together cover the entire church year. The settings contain the text of the gospel reading for the day as well as a short introductory phrase which summarizes or sets the stage for the actual Biblical passage.

== Works ==
Published

- Neue ausserlesene deutsche und lateinische Lieder (Frankfurt an der Oder, 1599, 26 works, 3 voices)
- Neue geistliche zu christlicher Andacht bewegende Lieder (Frankfurt an der Oder, 1599, 36 works, 5 voices)
- Neue ausserlesene weltliche Lieder (Frankfurt an der Oder, 1599, 26 works, 5 voices)
- Selectissimae & novae cantiones sacrae (Frankfurt an der Oder, 1600, 26 works, 6 voices)
- Dritter Theil neuer ausserlesener geistlicher und weltlicher Lieder (Coburg, 1602, 20 works, 3 voices)
- Selectissimae & novae cantiones sacrae (Liegnitz, 1606, 20 works, 4 voices)
- Neue ausserlesene Lieder (Liegnitz, 1607, 20 works, 5 voices)
- Selectissimae & novae cantiones sacrae (Liegnitz, 1608, 8 pieces, 6 and 8 voices)
- Selectissimae & novae cantiones sacrae (Liegnitz, 1610, 12 pieces, 5 voices)
- Festorum paschalis et pentecostes officium … introitus, missae, sequentiae (Liegnitz, 1615, 5 voices)
- Hochzeitlicher Gesang (Erfurt, 1615, 5 voices)
- Der 150. Ps Davids (Liegnitz, 1616, 7 voices)
- Erster Theil sontäglicher Evangelien … von Advent biss auff Cantate (Liegnitz, 1616, 30 pieces, 5 voices)
- Ander Theil sontäglicher Evangelien … von Cantate biss auff Advent (Liegnitz, 1621, 30 pieces, 5 voices)
- Ein schöner Spruch aus dem Hohen Lied (Liegnitz, 1621, 6 voices)
- Etliche trostreiche Text a. d. Psalmen und Jesus Sirach (Breslau, 1623, 8 voices)
- Melpomene sacra … das ist ausserlesene geistliche Gesänge auff alle vornehme Fest durchs gantze Jahr (Breslau, 1624, 16 pieces, 6 voices)
- Von Gott mir ist erkohren, wedding motet (Freiburg, 1624, 5 voices)
- Der 128. Psalm Davids (Liegnitz, no date, 6 voices)

Published/copied elsewhere

- 1 mass
- 12 motets, 4, 5, and 6 voices
- 6 sacred lieder, 5 voices
- 6 secular songs, 5 voices
