= John Cochran =

John Cochran may refer to:

- John Cochran (artist) (fl. 1821–1865), British portrait miniaturist and engraver
- John Cochran (Australian politician) (1864–1926), member of the New South Wales Legislative Assembly
- John Cochran (cricketer) (1909–1987), South African cricketer
- John Cochran (fl. 1680s), Scottish negotiator for land purchase for Stuarts Town, Carolina in 1684
- John Cochran (physician) (1730–1807), American Revolutionary War military physician
- John Cochran (Survivor contestant) (born 1987), American television personality
- John J. Cochran (1880–1947), US Representative from Missouri
- John P. Cochran (1809–1898), Governor of Delaware
- John P. Cochran, Dean, School of Business at Metropolitan State College of Denver
- Johnnie Cochran (1937–2005), American attorney

== See also ==
- Jackie Cochran (disambiguation)
- John Cochrane (disambiguation)
