= John Cochrane (Royalist) =

Scottish soldier and diplomat

Sir John Cochrane (died 1650?) was a Scottish soldier and diplomat.

== Life ==
Cochrane was the eldest son of Alexander Blair, who on his marriage with Elizabeth, daughter of William Cochrane of Cochrane, assumed the name of Cochrane. His younger brother William Cochrane became first Earl of Dundonald.

He was in command of a regiment at Edinburgh in 1640, and in the following year was implicated in the plot for seizing the chiefs of the parliamentary party. He was arrested, but after being released on bail, he joined Charles I at York in 1642. He was sent by Charles to Denmark to solicit help in men or money; he returned with the Danish ambassador, who was instructed to attempt to mediate between the king and the parliament, and was then arrested in London. Having regained his liberty he was placed by the king in command of Towcester in 1643. His estates were forfeited in the following year.

He was subsequently employed in raising money for the royal cause in Hamburg, Danzig, and Poland. He was living in 1650, and probably died before the Restoration of 1660. His wife was a Butler of the Ormonde family.
