= Donald Alexander Cochrane =

- Origin: Ontario, Canada.
- Genres: Instrumental Music Classical Music
- Occupations: Composer; Teacher

Donald Alexander Cochrane (born 1928) is a Canadian composer, responsible for compositions, including symphonies, quintets and mixed choral/orchestra pieces.

== Education and Teaching ==
Donald Alexander Cochrane, Canadian composer and pianist was born in Cornwall, Ontario. After high-school graduation he moved to New York City to study piano under Dr. Alexander Klahr, a former associate of the University of Vienna, Austria. He earned his BSc. degree from Columbia University, NYC. After that, he proceeded to study music composition with Dr. Hans Sachsse of the Munich High School for Music. For twenty-five years Cochrane worked as a high-school music department head in the Toronto area. After retirement, he continued work with computer music software.

== Composer ==
He is a prolific composer whose oeuvre consists of 12 piano concerti (the last one was written in 2008), 10 symphonies, the last in 2004, 2 albums of piano music, 6 sets of orchestral variations, chamber music, a viola concerto for small Orchestra, 2 string quartets, 2 piano quintets, woodwind quintet, brass quintet, clarinet quartet, saxophone quartet, vocal music, settings from William Blake's "Songs of Innocence" – a capella – with piano accompaniment, an Odyssey, a cantata with original text for orchestra and mixed choir, a Tragic Tale (an allegory for narrator and symphony orchestra) and Evangel, an Oratorio for solo voices, mixed choir and symphony orchestra. Cochrane is well known for his compositions for quartets of various instrumentation. Further, Cochrane's piece, Quintoporany, a brass quintet can be found on Pro Music. A sample of the score is also available.

=== Selected compositions ===
==== Symphonies ====
Symphony nr 1, 1982 approx 26 minutes

Symphony nr 2, 1983 approx 30 minutes

Symphony nr 3, 1988 approx 28 minutes

Symphony nr 4, 1990 approx 20 minutes

Symphony nr 5, 1991 approx 30 minutes

Symphony nr 6, 1992 approx 28 minutes

Symphony nr 7, 1996 approx 20 minutes

Symphony nr 8 2002 approx 18 minutes

Symphony nr 9 2004 approx 18 minutes

Symphony nr 10 2005 approx 24 minutes

==== Concerti ====
Piano concert nr 1, 1984

Piano concert nr 2, 1994

Piano concert nr 3, 1995

Piano concert nr 4, 1997

Piano concert nr 5, 1999

Piano concert nr 6, 2001

Viola concert/Chamber Orchestra, 1996, approx 17 minutes

Piano Concerti from 7-12 were written from 2002 to 2008

==== Orchestral works ====
Early Songs for Voice/Orchestra 1955 Tragic Tale, 1956, 17 minutes

Odessy for Choir/Orchestra, 1970, 18 minutes

Variations on Originel Thema, 1975, 13 minutes

Variations on a Pop song nr 1, date ?

Variations on a Sea Shanty, 1984, 13 minutes

Culmination, 1989, 70 minutes

Variations on an Irish Air, 1995, 12 minutes

Variations on a Popsong nr 2, 1995, 11 minutes

Evange for Choir/Orchestra, 1996, 57 minutes

Suite Chamber Orchestra, 1996, 12 minutes

==== Chamber music ====
Quartet nr 1 1970.

Quartet nr 2 1994

Sax Quartet 1974

Brass Quartet 1975

Piano Quintet nrv 1 1978

Piano Quintet nr 2 1993

==== Piano Solo ====
Lyric Pieces, 1969–1992

Soundings, 1986–2008

== Current Day ==
At present, Cochrane lives in Ontario and is currently working on a suite for harpsichord, piano and small orchestra. He could be considered one of Canada's important composers. Many of his compositions for piano have been performed by Canadian pianists, including Yaroslav Senyshyn. At the current time, many of Cochrane's performed compositions can be found on iTunes.
