= David Stuttard =

British writer, theatre director and classical scholar

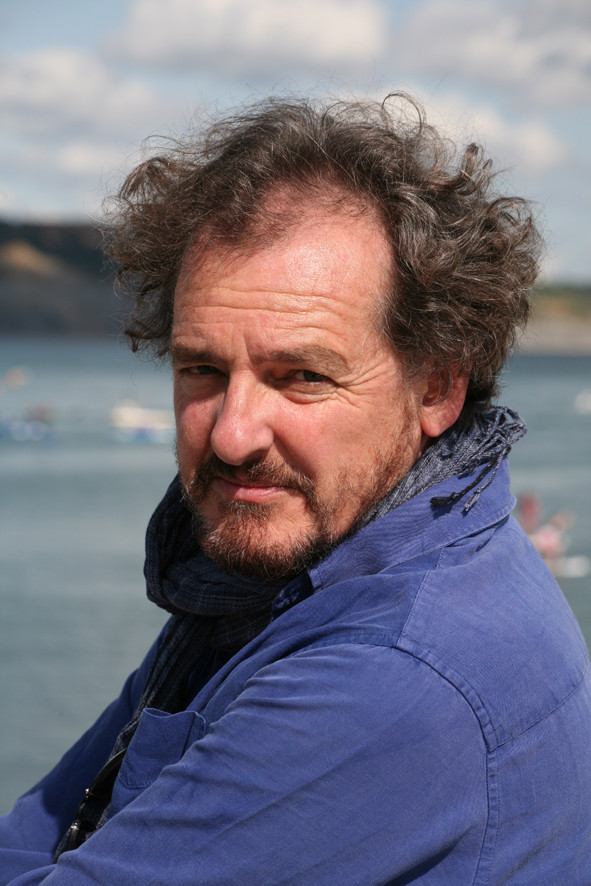

David Stuttard is a British theatre director, classical scholar, translator, lecturer on classical literature and history, and author, primarily of historical works on the ancient world.

== Biography ==
Stuttard read Classics at the University of St Andrews and taught the subject for eleven years. As well as being a professional lecturer and author, in 1993 he founded the touring theatre company Actors of Dionysus, which specializes in classical Greek drama. From 1993 to 2004 he was co-Artistic Director with Tamsin Shasha and directed his own translations and adaptations at venues in the UK and abroad. He has also written dramatic reconstructions of the lost Euripides plays Alexandros and Palamedes, which were premiered as part of 'The Trojan Trilogy' at the British Museum in April 2008. He teaches at University College London Workshops and at the Ancient and Classical Worlds Summer School at The University of Cambridge.

== Published works ==
Euripides' 'Medea'	Translation	Penguin Audiobooks 1997
Essays on 'Trojan Women'	Edition, with Tamsin Shasha	Actors of Dionysus 2002
Essays on 'Agamemnon'	Edition, with Tamsin Shasha	Actors of Dionysus 2003
An Introduction to 'Trojan Women'	An essay, with an adaptation and Audio CD of the play	Company Dionysus 2005
Essays on 'Bacchae'	Edition	Actors of Dionysus 2006
Looking at Lysistrata: Eight Essays and a New Version of Aristophanes' Provocative Comedy	Edition	Duckworth 2010
AD 410: The Year That Shook Rome	Written with Sam Moorhead	British Museum Press 2010
Power Games: Ritual and Rivalry at the Ancient Greek Olympics		British Museum Press 2012
31 BC: Antony, Cleopatra and the Fall of Egypt		British Museum Press 2012
The Romans Who Shaped Britain	Written with Sam Moorhead	Thames & Hudson 2012
The Parthenon: Power and Politics on the Acropolis		British Museum Press 2013
Looking at Medea: Essays and a translation of Euripides' tragedy		Bloomsbury Academic 2014
A History of Ancient Greece in Fifty Lives		Thames & Hudson 2014
Sappho: The Sweetness of Honey	Translations with Josephine Balmer, Audio CD	Actors of Dionysus 2015
Greek Mythology: A Traveller's Guide from Mount Olympus to Troy	Drawings by Lis Watkins	Thames & Hudson 2016
Looking at Bacchae: Essays and a translation of Euripides' tragedy		Bloomsbury Academic 2016
Nemesis: Alcibiades and the Fall of Athens		Harvard University Press 2018
Looking at Antigone: Essays and a translation of Sophocles' tragedy		Bloomsbury Academic 2019
Phoenix: A Father, a Son, and the Rise of Athens		Harvard University Press 2021
Hubris: Pericles, the Parthenon, and the Invention of Athens		Harvard University Press 2026
