= Elspeth Seton Cochrane =

Elspeth Seton Cochrane (27 April 1916 – 16 May 2011) was a British actress, playwright, stage manager, and agent. She was born in England, and in 1946 married Peter Potter, who was the director of the Glasgow Citizens' Theatre.

== Career ==
=== Actor ===
Cochrane trained as an actress at the Webber Douglas Academy. She acted in theatres across the UK as well as in the West End and in Canada. In 1941, she put together a company of actors from London, including Harold Scott and Mary Pratt, to perform the London Concert Party's show The Moonrakers, and they toured villages in Somerset, entertaining troops, evacuees and villagers who would otherwise have difficulty making it to a theatre due to travel restrictions during the war.

=== Writer ===
Though she had been writing since the age of twelve, it took some time for Cochrane to gather the courage to submit her work for production. Her first play, The Catherine Wheel, which took her two years to write, had its world premiere at the Connaught Theatre in Worthing, England in the spring of 1951, starring Mary Ward. She then went on to adapt several works for television, including Theatre by Somerset Maugham for the BBC, and Mr. Bolfry by James Bridie for Granada.

=== Stage manager ===
In 1939, she expanded her career to include stage management, wanting to learn more about the requirements of the theatre. She stage managed at the Glasgow Citizens' Theatre for several years prior to her husband assuming the director's position there.

In 1942 she worked at the Old Vic with Tyrone Guthrie. When, in 1953, Guthrie learned she was visiting Toronto, he brought her aboard as stage manager for the Stratford Festival's first season in 1953. She remained in Canada after the season, working on several productions. She worked with Leonard Crainford as assistant director for Jupiter Theatre's production of Ring Round the Moon, starring Douglas Rain, Jane Mallett, and Toby Robbins, at the Royal Alexandra Theatre in Toronto that October. This was followed by a move to Ottawa, where she worked on Mr. Bolfry at the Canadian Repertory Theatre. This was followed by a return to Toronto to stage manage for the Crest Theatre in January 1954.

Cochrane returned to the Stratford Festival as a stage director for Measure for Measure and The Taming of the Shrew in the 1954 season.

=== Agent ===
In January 1957, Cochrane founded a theatrical agency in London called Theatrework with Jacqueline Cundall. It began to turn a profit within six months, with clients that included Covent Garden, Edinburgh's Gateway Theatre, the BBC, and the Granada television network. Cochrane and Cundall expanded to found a second agency of the same name in Canada. Cochrane returned to Canada for two weeks in October 1957 to set it up.

Both branches had a much wider remit than is typical of theatrical agencies in the 21st century; they each had a script agency, a theatre staff bureau, and an "advice to amateurs" department, as well as a props department that served plays, film, television, and advertising. At the London branch, the theatre staff bureau served all theatre workers except actors; the Canadian branch included actors in its services, due primarily to requests from actors like William Hutt.

At the Canadian branch of Theatrework, Rita Greer Allen and Doris Berry staffed the script department, property master Brian Jackson manufactured the props, and Hedley Mattingly acted as general manager.

The London branch of Theatrework was eventually renamed Elspeth Cochrane Personal Management and did begin representing actors as well. Her first acting client was James Cairncross, and she also represented Rosemary Leach early in her career.

In late 1961, Cochrane saw a young Sir Ian McKellen play the role of Simon Mason in End of Conflict at the Belgrade Theatre in Coventry. In March 1963, she became his first agent.

On his website, Sir Ian McKellen explains:

"Elspeth Cochrane had watched my progress over the previous year when she visited her clients in Coventry and Ipswich. I only felt I needed an agent (who costs 10% of your salary) when I began to wonder what I should do after I had finished a year at Ipswich."

== Later life and death ==
At the age of 94, shortly before her death, Cochrane fell victim to a conman, Tony Barlow, who stole her life savings of £63,000. Barlow had previously taken over £100,000 from theatre producer Alan Sievewright in a similar manner. Barlow exploited Cochrane's poor health in order to gain access to her bank accounts, which he then drained over the course of two years. Cochrane was left in a terrible financial situation, unable to afford the retirement home for actors she had hoped to move into. Barlow was sentenced to 40 months in prison.

Cochrane died on May 16, 2011, at the age of 95, after a career in the theatre that lasted more than 50 years. On hearing of her death, while filming The Hobbit in New Zealand, Sir Ian McKellen said:

"I am not alone in feeling ever grateful to Elspeth Cochrane. I was blessed to have her as my agent when I was starting out as an actor. As the best agents do, she saw everything I did near and far. Her own experience as a stage director, actor, and writer fed her lifelong encouragement of youngsters to be as devoted to the theatre as she was."
