= Elspeth (band) =

- Origin: Newry, Northern Ireland
- Genres: Alternative rock
- Years active: 2011–present
- Label: No Dancing Records
- Members: Vocals/Guitar - Gerard Sands; Guitar - Leo Sands; Guitar - Jonathan McAteer; Bass - Davy Short; Drums - Phil Corrigan

Elspeth are an Irish 5-piece alternative rock band formed by brothers Gerard and Leo Sands. Their sound combines offbeat, atmospheric, stilted rhythms that climb and fall over steely guitar thrills and gradual bass lines.

Elspeth have garnered support from radio stations across the UK and Ireland including Tom Robinson and Gideon Coe on BBC 6Music, Phantom FM, Cool FM and BBC Radio 1 Introducing, which featured a live session with the band in early 2012. The track "The Taster" is featured on their debut album Coax, which was released by No Dancing Records on 13 May 2012.

Festival appearances include a storming debut performance at 'Glasgowbury' 2011, 'Indiependance' and 'Sunflowerfest' 2012.

Most recently they have played live shows supporting Wintersleep, Clock Opera, Spector, Sea Of Bees, Dog Is Dead, General Fiasco and Cashier No.9.

== Discography ==
=== Studio albums ===
- Coax (13 May 2012)

=== Singles ===
- "24hr Paramedics" (16 July 2012)
