= Elsbeth Lange =

German palynologist and archaeologist

- Born: November 20, 1928; Frankenberg in Saxony
- Died: December 10, 2009 (aged 81)
- Scientific career
- Fields: palynology
- Institutions: University of Hamburg
- Theses: On the vegetation history of the central Thuringian Basin. (Zur Vegetationsgeschichte des zentralen Thüringer Beckens.) (1965); On the development of natural and anthropogenic vegetation in prehistoric times. (Zur Entwicklung der natürlichen und anthropogenen Vegetation in frühgeschichtlicher Zeit.) (1974)

Elsbeth Lange (1928–2009) was a German palynologist at University of Hamburg. She worked in the fields of vegetation history, paleo-ethnobotany and archaeobotany.

== Education and personal life ==
Elsbeth Lange was born in 1928 in Frankenberg, Saxony. Her parents Bruno and Margarethe Lange were a shoemaker and weaver, respectively. After attending elementary school and a commercial vocational school in Frankenberg (1935–1944), she was apprenticed in November 1944 and then employed in town administration first in Frankenberg and then in Stollberg and Chemnitz. In 1951 she started study and practical training that qualified her as a lower school teacher by 1953. Lange then had a post as a teaching assistant at the young naturalists station in Jena. She completed a distance learning course alongside her job, which earned her a qualification to teach middle school biology in 1957. In the winter semester of 1956/1957 she began studying biology at the University of Jena, which she completed in May 1961 with a biochemical thesis on methods of qualitative saponin detection and their applications to the study of Primulaceae.

From 1960 until 1966, Lange was a research assistant at the Institute for Special Botany at the University of Jena. She received her doctorate on May 28, 1965, with a thesis on the history of vegetation. On September 1, 1966, she became a research assistant at the Institute for Prehistory and Protohistory (later the Central Institute for Ancient History and Archeology) of the Academy of Sciences of the GDR in Berlin and remained there until 1988. On October 23, 1974, she completed her habilitation at the Botanical Institute of the University of Halle, part of the faculty of natural sciences. In the same year she became a corresponding member of the International Union for Quaternary Research. On September 1, 1984, she was appointed Professor by the GDR Academy of Sciences.

== Botanical career ==
The majority of paleobotanists in Germany, unlike most other European countries, were men until the late 1940s because of the subject's close association with mining. Lange was thus one of the first German women to move into Quaternary botany. She made significant achievements in the subject. As well as studying the Quaternary period she also studied older material and collaborated with archaeobotanists in Germany and other countries. She employed electron microscopy to identify pollen, and then used this information to provide insight into land use in the past. This included open grassland areas converted to agricultural use as well as how this these changes were recorded in wetlands.

== Publications ==
Lange was the author or co-author of over 100 books and scientific publications up to 2002, and others since. They include:

- Elsbeth Lange and Eike Gringmuth-Dallmer: Investigations into the history of vegetation and settlement in southern Thuringia. (Untersuchungen zur Vegetations- und Besiedlungsgeschichte im südlichen Thüringen.) Rhöne Biosphere Reserve, Kaltensundheim 2001 (Also Communications from the Rhöne Biosphere Reserve, Volume 4)
- Elsbeth Lange, Lebrecht Jeschke and Hans Dieter Knapp: Ralswiek and Rügen. Landscape development and settlement history of the Baltic Sea island. Volume 1: The landscape history of the island of Rügen since the late glacial period. (Ralswiek und Rügen. Landschaftsentwicklung und Siedlungsgeschichte der Ostseeinsel. Band 1: Die Landschaftsgeschichte der Insel Rügen seit dem Spätglazial). Akademie-Verlag, Berlin 1986
- Elsbeth Lange and Wolfgang Heinrich (text), Hille Blumfeldt (illustrations), Kurt Freytag (edit): We identify plants. Kinderbuchverlag, Berlin 1978, 6th edition 1988; Also Aulis-Verlag, Köln 1981, ISBN 3-358-00621-2
- Elsbeth Lange, Botanical contributions to Central European settlement history. Results on the economy and cultural landscape in early historical times. (Botanische Beiträge zur mitteleuropäischen Siedlungsgeschichte. Ergebnisse zur Wirtschaft und Kulturlandschaft in frühgeschichtlicher Zeit.) Akademie-Verlag, Berlin 1971

Some of her scientific publications include:

- Egon Köhler & Elsbeth Lange (1979) A contribution to distinguishing cereal from wild grass pollen grains by LM and SEM. Grana 18 (3) pp 133–140

== Awards and honours ==
Lange received the Caspar Friedrich Wolff Medal from the Biological Society of the GDR. From 1969 to 2002 she was a member of the Botanical Association of Berlin and Brandenburg. She was a corresponding member of the German Archaeological Institute from 1997.
