= Ilya Berezhnykh =

Russian navigator

Ilya Avtonomovich Berezhnykh (Russian: Илья́ Автоно́мович Бережны́х; birth date unknown – c. 1830), also known as Berezhnoy (Бережно́й), was a Russian navigator.

In 1820, Berezhnykh took part in the northern expedition, led by Ferdinand Petrovich Wrangel. He explored the coastline and the islands of the Arctic Ocean, including Kotelny and Lyakhovsky Islands as an underpilot in 1826.
