= The Magic Roundabout =

English television series, 1965–1977

- Genre: Children's television series
- Created by: Serge Danot
- Based on: Le Manège enchanté by Serge Danot
- Written by: Eric Thompson
- Narrated by: Eric Thompson; Nigel Planer; Jimmy Hibbert
- Theme music composer: Alain Legrand
- Countries of origin: France (original footage); United Kingdom (audio content)
- No. of episodes: 441

Production
- Executive producers: Robert Réa (2007–2010); Pascal Roden (2007–2010); Laurent Roden (2007–2010); Claude Gorsky (2007–2010)
- Animator: Ivor Wood
- Running time: 450 × 5 minutes (1965–1992); 104 × 11 minutes (2007–2010)
- Production companies: Danot Production (1965–1992); AB Productions (1971–1993); Ellipsanime (2007–2010); Action Synthese (2007–2010); Les Film Action (2007–2010); Play Production (2007–2010)

Original release
- Network: BBC1
- Release: 18 October 1965 – 25 January 1977
- Network: Channel 4
- Release: March 1992 – September 1993
- Network: Nick Jr.
- Release: October 22, 2007 – November 23, 2010

The Magic Roundabout is an English-language children's programme that ran on BBC Television from 1965 to 1977.

It used the footage of the French stop motion animation show Le Manège enchanté but with completely different scripts and characters. The French series, created by Serge Danot with the help of Ivor Wood and Wood's French wife, Josiane, was broadcast from 1964 to 1974 on ORTF (Office de Radiodiffusion Télévision Française). The scripts are simple fantasy stories aimed at pre-school children, with no relation to the real world. The BBC originally rejected translating the series because it was "charming ... but difficult to dub into English", but later produced a version of the series using the French footage with new English-language scripts unrelated to the original storylines. This version, written and told by Eric Thompson, was broadcast in 441 five-minute episodes between 18 October 1965 and 25 January 1977. It proved a great success and attained cult status, and when in October 1966 it was moved from the slot just before the evening news to an earlier children's viewing time, adult viewers complained to the BBC.

== Characters ==
Although the characters are common to the French and English versions, they were given different names and personalities in each language.

The main character is Dougal (also known as Doogal; Pollux in the original French-language version), who is a drop-eared variety of the Skye Terrier.

Characters include Zebedee (Zébulon), a talking jack-in-the-box with magical powers; Brian (Ambroise), a snail; Ermintrude (Azalée), a cow; and Dylan (named after Bob Dylan) (Flappy), a hippy rabbit. There are two notable human characters: Florence (Margote), a young girl; and Mr Rusty (le Père Pivoine), the elderly moustached operator of the roundabout.

Other characters include Mr McHenry (Bonhomme Jouvence), an elderly gardener who rides a tricycle, and a talking locomotive with a 4-2-2 wheel arrangement and a two-wheel tender. Three other children, Paul, Basil and Rosalie, appeared in the original black-and-white serial and in the credit sequence of the colour episodes, but very rarely in subsequent episodes. The characters all reside in a place called The Magic Garden (Beautywood in the US version).

The show has a distinctive visual style. The set is a brightly coloured and stylised park containing the eponymous roundabout (a fairground carousel). The programmes were created using stop-motion animation, which meant that Dougal was made without legs to make him easier to animate. Zebedee was created from a giant pea which was available in the animation studio and was re-painted. The look of these characters was the responsibility of British animator Ivor Wood, who was working at Danot's studio at the time (and who subsequently animated The Herbs, Paddington Bear, Postman Pat, Gran and Bertha).

== English-language version ==
Narration in the British BBC version was entirely new and bears very little to no resemblance to the French version. It was created by Eric Thompson from just the visuals, without any translation of the French scripts by Serge Danot. Thompson provided all the voices, whereas in the French version each character was voiced by a different actor.

The first British broadcasts were shown every weekday on BBC1 at 17:50, just before the early-evening news at 17:55. Although the exact time of the early evening news varied over the years, The Magic Roundabout kept its slot before the bulletins for the duration of its original broadcasting, except for 16:55 time slots during October to November 1966, and earlier times during parts of 1972 and 1973. This was the first time an entertainment programme had been transmitted in this way in the UK. The original series, which was a serial, was made in black-and-white. From the second series onwards it was made in colour, but the series was still broadcast in black-and-white by the BBC; the first colour episode of the show ("Chocolate Soldiers") was transmitted on 5 October 1970. (Note: At the time of broadcast, the main BBC1 channel was still broadcast on the VHF band which was limited to 405 lines and did not support colour, while the newer BBC2 channel was in colour in the higher UHF band using PAL transmission for 625 lines.)

52 additional episodes, claimed to have been not previously broadcast, were shown in the United Kingdom from January to March 1992 on Channel 4's "The Channel Four Daily". Thompson had died by this time, and the job of narrating them in a pastiche of Thompson's style went to actor Nigel Planer. These episodes actually had been previously narrated by Thompson (particularly from the 1970–1971 series), being redubbed editions of the original French colour episodes by AB Productions (with different music) broadcast in 1990. An additional 43 episodes were narrated by Planer from April to September 1993, this time, with most of the episodes coming from a batch of new French episodes broadcast during that same year up until 1995.

The English version of Dougal was generally disparaging and had similarities with the television character of Tony Hancock, an actor and comedian. Ermintrude was rather matronly and fond of singing. Dylan was a hippy-like, guitar-playing rabbit, and rather dopey. Florence was portrayed as courteous and level-headed. Brian was unsophisticated but well-meaning.

Part of the show's attraction was that it appealed to adults, who enjoyed the world-weary Hancock-style comments made by Dougal, as well as to children. The audience measured eight million at its peak. There are speculations about possible interpretations of the show. One is that the characters represented French politicians of the time, and that Dougal represented Charles de Gaulle. In fact, when Serge Danot was interviewed by Joan Bakewell on Late Night Line-Up in 1968, his associate (perhaps Jean Biard) said that in France it was thought at first that the UK version of Pollux had been renamed "De Gaulle", mishearing the name Dougal (as seen in the Channel 4 documentary The Return of the Magic Roundabout (broadcast 08:50 on 25 December 1991 and 18:00 on 5 January 1992), and in the 2003 BBC4 documentary The Magic Roundabout Story).

Sometimes, the series broke the fourth wall. At the end of one episode, "A Peaceful Day", when Zebedee called his catchphrase of "Time for bed", Florence asked "Already?", and Zebedee replied that "It's nearly time for the news, and you've had enough magic for one day". The news was broadcast just after The Magic Roundabout. This story was later republished in print from Bloomsbury's 1998 book The Adventures of Brian.

In 1971 Brockhampton Press, under their paperback imprint Knight Books, published two books written by Eric Thompson, The Adventures of Dougal and Dougal's Scottish Holiday. These were original stories written by Thompson using the characters, and not versions of scripts from the series.

In 1998, Thompson's stories were published by Bloomsbury Publishing Plc as a series of four paperbacks, The Adventures of Dougal, The Adventures of Brian, The Adventures of Dylan and The Adventures of Ermintrude with forewords by his daughter Emma Thompson. While The Adventures of Dougal featured republications of three exclusive book stories, the latter three featured scripts from the TV series. She explains that her father had felt that he was most like Brian of all the characters and that Ermintrude was in some respects based upon his wife, Phyllida Law.

For years, the series had reruns on Cartoon Network and was later moved to its sister channel, Boomerang. These airings mainly used episodes from the 1974 series, which have been renarrated by Jimmy Hibbert (who unlike the previous British dubs, actually translated the French scripts, though not entirely verbatim), though some episodes from the Nigel Planer dub aired as well.

A new version is being made by the French studio Method Animation, initially targeted for 2024, that will try to "find a balance between the French and English contexts".

== Foreign-language versions ==
- In Italy, the series was known as "La giostra incantata" ("The Enchanted Carousel") and part of the series was broadcast since 1970 by the RAI state television network. In this version, Pollux/Dougal was renamed Bobo (initially Peluche) and the show stuck with the idea of giving each character its own voice. Bobo was still referred to as English but did not have an accent. The series was then re-distributed to local broadcasters as "Bobo & Company".
- In Portugal, the series was known as "Carrossel Mágico" (spelled as "Carrocel Mágico"), and aired on RTP in 1966. The dub was based on the original French version (with the characters having their own voices), and several of the characters were renamed, with Pollux/Dougal being called "Franjinhas". It was also the first foreign children's series to be dubbed into European Portuguese.
- In Germany and in Austria it was translated to Das Zauberkarussell. Most of the characters are given different names, except for Dougal and Zebedee who retain their original French names (Pollux and Zebulon, respectively).
  - In Austria there was in 1974/75 a special version in "Betthupferl" (the same as the German "Mr Sandman") called Gucki und seine Freunde (Cookie and his Friends), in which Cookie and his friend Apollonius always went through a hole in a tree to join the garden.
- In the United States, the series was called The Magic Carousel and it aired in the 1980s on Pinwheel, a programme on the children's channel Nickelodeon. This version used American actors such as Michael Karp (the voice of Dougal in this version) and was based on the original French incarnation, such as the scripts being word for word translations, and the characters having voices strikingly similar to the French dub's voices. Dylan and Mr. McHenry also retain their original French names (Flappy and Bonhomme Jouvence a.k.a. Mr. Young, respectively) with Mr Rusty having Mr. McHenry's name. Aside from that however, most of the characters have their names from the British version.
- In the Netherlands, a Dutch version was aired by the NTS (Dutch Television Foundation, one of the national broadcasters at the time) in black-and-white as De Minimolen ('The Mini Carousel'). Running from 5 June till 30 September 1967, the series aired on a six-days-per-week basis. The script in Dutch was written by Wim Meuldijk, who at the time was very successful in writing (and co-producing) the Pipo children's series. A brief second run of De Minimolen went on air in the late summer of 1980.

== Theme tunes ==
The show's theme by Alain Legrand was a cheerful organ tune. In the early black-and-white episodes, it was played more slowly with a degree of sadness. There were also two different additional theme songs for reruns of the original French version; the first, "C'est moi, Pollux" (1983), was a moderately popular single in France, while the theme from 1990 was an upbeat Hammond organ pop tune with children's vocals.

== Film versions ==
Unlike the series, both films featured a villain in the Magic Roundabout canon.

=== Dougal and the Blue Cat ===
Danot made a longer film, Pollux et le chat bleu, in 1970 which was also adapted by Thompson and shown in Britain as Dougal and the Blue Cat. The story centres on Dougal, who becomes suspicious when a blue cat arrives at the Magic Garden. It turned out the cat, named Buxton, was working for an unseen voice (named the Blue Voice) of an abandoned factory, who wanted to take over the garden and turn everything into the colour blue. Upon this takeover, the residents of the garden also ended up being imprisoned, except for Dougal, who made a plan to rescue his friends. Among the film's many highlights, Buxton made a disguised Dougal face his ultimate weakness by locking him in a room full of sugar. The Blue Voice was voiced by Fenella Fielding and was the only time Thompson called in another person to voice a character.

=== 2005 CGI film ===
In 2005, a film adaptation (also called The Magic Roundabout) was released. The movie was about Dougal, Ermintrude, Brian and Dylan going on a quest to stop Zebedee's evil twin Zeebad, who intends on creating an eternal winter. It was made using modern computer animation, and adopted the approach of the original creator, Serge Danot, of giving each character its own voice rather than using a narrator. The voices included Tom Baker, Joanna Lumley, Ian McKellen, Jim Broadbent, Kylie Minogue, Robbie Williams, Ray Winstone, Bill Nighy and Lee Evans. The film received mixed reviews, with a 50% approval rating on Rotten Tomatoes, while Total Film ranked it as the 45th worst children's movie ever made. The two-disc special edition of the UK DVD of the film features five of the original Magic Roundabout episodes (including the English version of "Mr. Rusty Meets Zebedee", the very first episode from 1965) on the second disc. They are all presented in the original black-and-white with the option of viewing them in English or in the original French.

In 2006, the film was released in the US as Doogal. The majority of original British voices were replaced by celebrities more familiar to the American public, such as Whoopi Goldberg and Chevy Chase. Only two original voices remained: those of Kylie Minogue and Ian McKellen. The final North American version was panned. As of September 2020, it had an 8% approval rating on Rotten Tomatoes. It received a score of 23 out of 100 ("generally unfavorable") on Metacritic, and an F rating from Entertainment Weekly magazine. It was also a financial failure, grossing a total of 7.2 million dollars in the United States, which is considered low by CGI animated film standards.

==== 2007 continuation as a TV series ====
In 2007, a new TV version of The Magic Roundabout was created, with 52 x 11-minute episodes. The series was produced by Action Synthese, Films Action, Ellipsanime and Play Production with the participation of M6, Nickelodeon UK and Disney Television France. The scripts and voices were produced in the UK. The show was directed by Graham Ralph of Silver Fox Films and produced by Theresa Plummer Andrews.

Using the CGI designed versions of the original characters from the 2005 film also produced by Action Synthese, the only new characters taken from the film are Mr. Grimsdale the baker and Soldier Sam. The series takes place after the events of the 2005 film of the same name. The new series also created a few original characters of its own such as Fly and Dougal's Auntie Primrose.

Every episode would begin with Zebedee giving a brief summary to the audience of what will happen, before the plot begins. The episodes would also end with Zebedee throwing a party after the problems have been solved, with Dylan droopily remarking, "I wish it was time for bed, man..." (in reference to the original series' quote "Time for bed") before drifting off to sleep.

The series was first broadcast in the UK from 22 October 2007 at 8.00 am on satellite channel Nick Jr. It was also broadcast on the children's channel of China Central Television (CCTV-14) in Chinese during 2017 and was briefly available on Netflix in the US.

In October 2008, a Double DVD Bumper Pack Boxset of the 2007 reboot was released from Abbey Home Media, called Dougal's Darling and The Wishing Tree. It featured 12 Season 1 episodes, all of which are in order except for the two titular episodes.

In 2010, a second season of 52 11-minute episodes was created. This season included ZDF as an additional participator.

== Records ==
In 1971, BBC Records released The Magic Roundabout (RBT 8), an LP containing 10 stories taken from the soundtracks of the TV series as told by Eric Thompson. The stories were: "Dougal's Experiment", "A Starry Night", "The Moody Concerto", "Dougal's Adventure", and "The Stiff Necked Heliotropes" on side one and "The Birds School", "The Piano Carrier", "Banana Skin", "The Musical Box", and "The Announcer" on side two. This album has been re-released twice on CD by the BBC, first in 2005 (BBC Audio:Children's) to coincide with the 'new' film and again in 2010 (Vintage Beeb), featuring the original LP artwork and a bonus interview with Eric Thompson.

French soundtrack recordings were also issued in France in the 1960s on three EPs and again on an LP Pollux in 1983, along with an original single "C'est moi Pollux".

== Theatre ==
A theatre production called The World Premiere of the Magic Roundabout was performed at the Gordon Craig Theatre on 17-20 August 1993 and the Palace Theatre on 23-28 August 1993. The show was produced and directed by David Graham for DGM Production, and featured Don Cotter as Brian, Meg Dixon as Florence, Anne Fawcett as Ermintrude, Kim Joyce as Zebedee and Mr Rusty, David Moran as Dougal, and Jack Randle as Dylan.

== Revival ==
A revival of the series is in the works at Mediawan (who acquired AB Groupe in 2017, whose previously produced the fourth season and remastered the previous three seasons including their original French version) through French animation production studio Method Animation and British animation studio Wildseed Studios with Jérôme Brizé's production company and rights to the series Magic! co-producing.

== Home releases ==
VHS title	Release date	Episodes
The Magic; Roundabout (BBCV 9009 / BBCV 4278)	September 1984 (original release); 2 October 1989 (first re-release); 3 August 1992 (second re-release)	All episodes included are from the 1974 series.: "Dougal – "Film Director"; "Walking Sticks"; "Bicycle Race"; "The Cannon"; "Rustlers"; "Gold"; "Parking Meters"; "The Camera"; "The Caravan"; "The Experiment"; "Magic Carpet"; "Oil"; "Vote for Dougal"
The Magic; Roundabout 2 (BBCV 4499)	1 April 1991 (original release); 3 August 1992 (re-release)	All episodes included are from the second half from the 1970–1971 series.: "Bubbles"; "Piano Moving"; "Let's Play at Cats"; "Watch the Birdie"; "Dylan, Sculptor"; "The Orchestra"; "Pack of Cards"; "Toffee River"; "Oil Wells"; "Banana Skin"; "Spaghetti Party"; "Rain"; "Baking A Pie"
The Magic; Roundabout 3 (BBCV 4734)	3 February 1992 (original release); 3 August 1992 (re-release)	All episodes included are from the first half from the 1970–1971 series.: "Alarm Clock"; "Brian and the Train Race"; "The Chimney Sweep"; "Road Signs"; "Dylan Plays the Bagpipes"; "Dougal's Glasses"; "Hide and Seek"; "The Lost Boing"; "Windy"; "The Scarecrow"; "Musical Box"; "The Oyster"; "Dylan the Hairdresser"
The Magic; Roundabout 4 (BBCV 4829)	3 August 1992	All episodes included are from the 1970–1971 series.: "TV Announcer"; "Magic Pot"; "The Picnic"; "Ermintrude's Folly"; "The Exhibition"; "Holidays"; "Relay Race"; "Soul of the Violin"; "The Tombola"; "Pancakes"; "Flying Saucer"; "The Sleepwalker"; "A Starry Night"
The Very Best of the Magic Roundabout (BBCV 4955)	5 April 1993	A compilation of episodes previously released on VHS.: "The Orchestra"; "Dougal's Glasses"; "TV Announcer"; "Rustlers"; "The Lost Boing"; "Baking A Pie"; "Ermintrude's Folly"; "Magic Carpet"; "The Chimney Sweep"; "Dylan, Sculptor"; "Hide and Seek"; "Pancakes"; "Watch the Birdie"; "The Experiment"; "A Starry Night"; "Road Signs"; "Dougal – Film Director"

Between 1993 and 1997, two videos of the re-narrated version were released by PolyGram Video.

VHS title	Release date	Episodes
The New Magic Roundabout (0844403 / 6344983 / 0463543)	15 March 1993 (original release); 24 April 1995 (first re-release); 16 June 1997 (second re-release)	All episodes are narrated by Nigel Planer. Unlike the previous VHS releases with the Eric Thompson episodes, these versions don't show episode titles. Includes ten episodes which are re-tellings of: "Alarm Clock"; "Land of Feathers" (Dougal’s Hay Fever); "Mushroom"; "Jumping Competition" (Sports Day); "Dylan Plays the Bagpipes" (Highland Games); "Dougal's Glasses" (Dougal the Novelist); "The Scarecrow"; "Hide and Seek"; "Sad Onion" (Cosmic Onion); "Musical Box"; (6 of these episodes were previously released on volume 3, with Thompson's narration.)
The New Magic Roundabout (Extended release) (0875663)	16 August 1993	All episodes are narrated by Nigel Planer. Unlike the previous VHS releases with the Eric Thompson episodes, these versions don't show episode titles. The twenty episodes include re-tellings of: "Alarm Clock"; "Land of Feathers" (Dougal’s Hay Fever)"; "Mushroom"; "Jumping Competition" (Sports Day)"; "Dylan Plays the Bagpipes" (Highland Games); "Dougal's Glasses" (Dougal the Novelist); "The Scarecrow"; "Hide and Seek"; "Sad Onion" (Cosmic Onion); "Musical Box"; "Cow Railway" (Daisy Chain); "Glasses" (parts 1 and 2, "Birdwatching" and "Dancing Glasses"); "Road Signs" (Highway Code); "The Lost Boing" (Zebedee's Day Off); "Plans for Rusty's House" (Bad Post); "Building Rusty's House" (New Home); "Rusty's House"; "Dougal's Jam"; "Penelope is Lazy" (Chivalry); Note: 8 of these episodes were previously released on volume 3, with Thompson's narration.

In 1999, the original film Dougal and the Blue Cat was released on video by Second Sight Television.

VHS name	Release date	Film included
The Magic Rounadbout: Dougal and the Blue Cat (2TV 2008)	18 October 1999	"Dougal and the Blue Cat"

Apart from the original film Dougal and the Blue Cat, the series has yet to receive any standalone release on DVD, but five of the original black-and-white episodes, including the series premiere, "Mr. Rusty Meets Zebedee", have been included as a bonus on the second disc of the UK Special Edition DVD of the 2005 CGI film. The other episodes included are "Camping", "Perfume", "Jumping Beans", and "Rocking Chair" from March 1967. Except for the series premiere, those four episodes also feature their original French versions with English subtitles.

Between 2008 and 2010, five DVDs of the 2007 reboot series were released by Abbey Home Media.

DVD title	Release date	Episodes
The Magic Roundabout – The Greatest Show on Earth	31 March 2008	7 episodes from Season 1 from the 2007 series.: "The Greatest Show on Earth"; "Dougal's Bad Smell Day"; "Look Back In Gaga"; "Dougal Goes To The Moon"; "The Race"; "Dylan's Wake-up Call"; "Dogtective"
The Magic Roundabout – Dougal's Darling & The Wishing Tree (Double DVD Bumper Pack)	6 October 2008	12 episodes from Season 1 from the 2007 series.: "The Wishing Tree"; "The Thingy"; "Parcel Farce"; "Litterbugs"; "A Very Dodgy Exercise"; "Can't Sing Won't Sing"; "Dougal's Darling"; "Let's Go Fly a Kite"; "Read All About It"; "Digger!"; "School's In, Out & All About"; "The Supersonic Spotted Stagbeast"
The Magic Roundabout – Rockstar Dylan & Treasure Beyond Measure (Double DVD Bumper Pack)	2010	12 episodes from Season 1 from the 2007 series.: "Rockstar Dylan"; "The Vegetable is Revolting"; "Barmy Army"; "The Case of the Missing Carrots"; "The Sorcerer's Mate"; "Bones Are For Eating"; "Treasure Beyond Measure"; "Follow That Piano"; "Poor Mr. Rusty"; "The Call of the Wild"; "Interior Des-aster"; "Kiss and Make Up"

== In popular culture ==
- Giant versions of Dougal and Zebedee, both the size of a small house, are featured in The Goodies episode "The Goodies Rule – O.K.?" Dougal also makes a brief appearance in another Goodies episode, "It Might as Well Be String".
- The title and characters appeared as a regular weekly feature in the children's comics TV Toyland, Playhour, Bonnie, See-Saw, and Playgroup. In Playhour Gordon Hutchings drew comic strips based on The Magic Roundabout for that magazine's front cover.
- No. 8 Squadron RAF nicknamed their Avro Shackleton early warning aircraft after characters from the show as well as characters from The Herbs.
