= Pat Cochran =

American politician

Member of the Washington House of Representatives from the 8th district
- In office 1975–1977

Personal details
- Born: July 27, 1916 Montana
- Died: April 8, 1989 (aged 72) Richland, Washington
- Party: Democratic
- Education: Montana State University
- Alma mater: Boston University
- Occupation: Politician

Pat Cochran (July 27, 1916 – April 8, 1989) was an American politician. She was a Democrat, representing District 8 in the Washington House of Representatives which included parts of Benton County and Yakima County, from 1975 to 1977.
