= Alan Sievewright =

- Sievewright c.1965
- Born: 12 May 1934; Edinburgh, Scotland
- Died: 23 January 2007; London, England
- Occupations: Designer; Producer; Opera impresario

Alan Sievewright (12 May 1934 – 23 January 2007) was a British designer, producer and opera impresario. In collaboration with his one time production partner Denny Dayviss, they produced "a treasury of operatic performances that those who saw them would never forget." A larger than life character, he helped launch the careers of many young artists.

== Life and career ==
Sievewright was born in Edinburgh, but his family moved to London when he was a small boy. He began his career as a designer in London in the 1950s, training first with Balmain in Paris and later designing haute couture for high society and for Rank films and such productions as Masterpiece Classic (1971), The Young Ones (1961) and The Rebel (1961).

Switching career in the early 1970s he began to independently produce semi-staged performances of opera in London with Denny Dayviss. One their most notable productions was Puccini's Turandot using the complete ending which Alfano had composed after Puccini died before the opera's completion. The 1982 performance at the Barbican Centre featured Sylvia Sass as Turandot and Franco Bonisolli as Calaf.

After pursuing Maria Callas to ask her to record a version of Peter and the Wolf, she directed him to Rudolf Nureyev who subsequently recorded it for Sievewright. As he became more successful he attracted prominent members of the British and international arts scene to his flat in Hyde Park Square, London where the threw parties and whose guests included Marlene Dietrich, Elaine Stritch and Ava Gardner.

In the 1990s Sievewright teamed up with Chris Hunt of Iambic Productions and Richard Price of Prime Time to create OnLine Classics - a series of documentaries about stage, screen and opera - a collaboration which went on to win many awards. He was later elected a Fellow of the Royal Society of Arts.

Sievewright died at the age of 72 after a long illness. His life partner, the musicologist Jeremy Parsons, had predeceased him.
