= Serge Danot =

French animator (1931-1990)

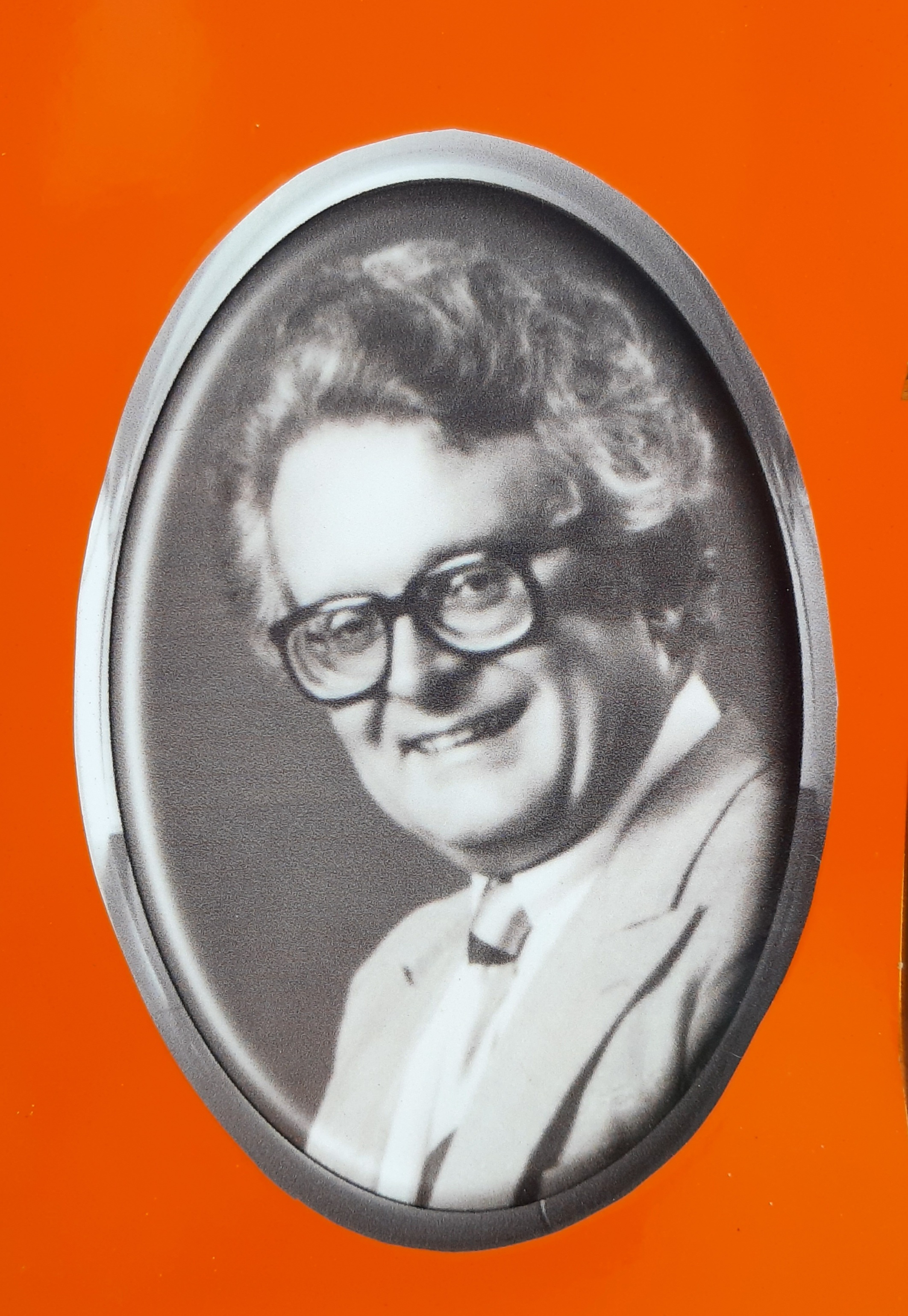
- Born: 7 February 1931; Nantes, France
- Died: 23 December 1990 (aged 59)

Serge Danot (7 February 1931 – 23 December 1990) was a French animator and former advertising executive. He is best known for creating the animated series, Le Manège enchanté in 1964, which became known in its 1965 English-language version, written and narrated by actor Eric Thompson for the BBC as The Magic Roundabout.

Danot was born in Nantes, France. As a young artist, he worked on the restoration of the Eiffel Tower and suffered an injury; while recuperating, he began practising animation. In 1969, he established his own company, called Danot Films. His partner in making The Magic Roundabout was a half-French, half-British animator, Ivor Wood.
