= Robert Cochran =

Robert Cochran or Cochrane may refer to:

- Robert Cochran (actor) (1906–1977), British actor
- Robert Cochran (TV producer), co-creator of the television series 24
- Robert Alexander Cochran (1917–1965), American film actor better known as Steve Cochran
- Robert E. Cochran, defender at the Battle of the Alamo
- Robert Leroy Cochran (1886–1963), former governor of Nebraska
- Bob Cochran (skier) (born 1951), former U.S. alpine ski racer; member of Skiing Cochrans family of Vermont
- Bobby Cochran (born 1950), American singer-songwriter
- Robert Cochrane (favourite) (died 1482), associate of James III of Scotland
- Robert Cochrane (witch) (1931–1966), English witch
- Robert H. Cochrane (1924–2010), bishop of the Episcopal Diocese of Olympia
