= John Dundas Cochrane =

Scottish explorer (1793–1825)

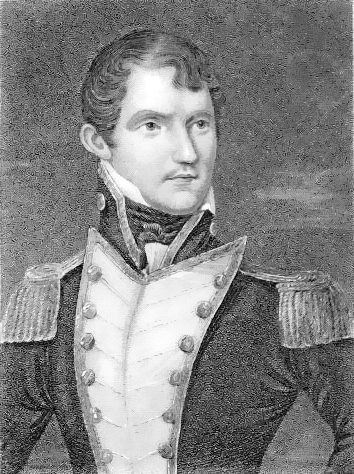
Captain John Dundas Cochrane, R.N.

Captain John Dundas Cochrane (14 February 1793 – 12 August 1825) was a Scottish officer in the Royal Navy, traveller and explorer. An illegitimate son of Scottish MP, army-commander and swindler Andrew Cochrane-Johnstone, John Dundas Cochrane came from extensive naval and army family - he was a cousin of Admiral Thomas Cochrane, 10th Earl of Dundonald, and nephew of Admiral Sir Alexander Forrester Inglis Cochrane.

== Life ==
After being placed on half-pay by the Royal Navy, following a short career at sea, John Dundas Cochrane made journeys into Spain and Portugal, before applying to the Admiralty to explore the River Niger in Africa. Being refused permission, he then decided to walk across Europe and Russia, in an attempt to reach North America. He set off in February 1820, crossing France and Germany before reaching St Petersburg in April. Continuing his journey eastwards, on foot, boat and horseback, he eventually reached Kolymsk in January 1821. Here he learned that the Bering Straits separated Russia from North America, so he decided to go to Kamchatka instead. He reached the peninsula in August 1821, and stayed there until July 1822. In January, he married (see below), and then he and his wife set off back to St Petersburg in July 1822. Cochrane himself made a short exploratory journey to Kyakhta and the frontier with Mongolia, briefly leaving his wife in Irkutsk. After many hardships, the couple arrived back in St Petersburg in June 1823, and returned by ship to London.
The outward journey from Dieppe to Kamchatka, via Kolymsk, was around 5,500 miles (8,900 km). The return journey to St Petersburg was around 4,250 miles (6,840 km).
After returning to England, John Dundas Cochrane published an account of his travels in his Narrative of a Pedestrian Journey through Russian and Siberian Tartary to the Frontiers of China, the Frozen Sea and Kamtchatka. This was first published by John Murray in 1823; second and third editions were printed by Charles Knight in 1824 and 1825; and a fourth edition by Archibald Constable in 1829. Translations were published in Weimar 1825, Jena 1825, Vienna 1826, and Delft 1826.
In June 1824, he travelled to South America, possibly to join his cousin Charles Stuart Cochrane who was involved in Simon Bolivar's struggles for independence. John returned to London in early 1825 to prepare the third edition of his book. Again leaving his wife alone in London, he then returned to South America in the summer of 1825, planning either to oversee work at his family's copper-mining interests in South America and/or to walk the length of the Andes mountains. He died of a fever on 12 August 1825 in Valencia, Colombia.

== Marriage ==
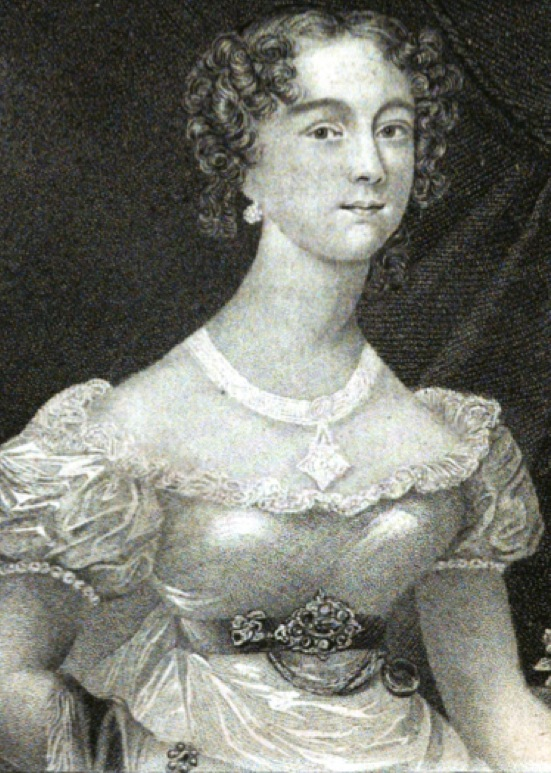
"Mrs Cochrane"

Cochrane married Ksenia Ivanovna Loginova (24 January 1807 (O.S.) - 1870) on 8 January 1822 (O.S.); she was the adoptive daughter of Admiral Pyotr Rikord, the Russian governor of Kamchatka. In Cochrane's Journal she is referred to not by name, but simply as "Mrs Cochrane". After the death of John Dundas, she returned to St Petersburg to live in Rikord's household in 1827, and there met and married (October 1828) Pyotr Anjou, an Arctic explorer and Russian admiral. She and Pyotr had six children, one of whom (also Pyotr, b.1836) was later an Arctic explorer in his own right.

== In Fiction ==
John Dundas Cochrane and his wife Ksenia Loginova feature as characters in Andrew Drummond's novel, Novgorod the Great (2010).

== Editions ==
John Dundas Cochrane's 2-volume journal is available on-line as follows:

- https://books.google.com/books?id=4QEEAAAAYAAJ - Volume I, 1829 edition. (Google scan.)
- https://archive.org/details/pedestrianjourne01cochuoft - Volume I, 1829 edition. (Scanned by MSN.)
- https://books.google.com/books?id=4D5CAAAAcAAJ - Volume II, 1824 edition. (Google scan.)
- https://archive.org/details/pedestrianjourne02cochuoft - Volume II, 1829 edition. (Scanned by MSN.)
