= Archibald Cochrane =

Archibald Cochrane may refer to:

- Archibald Cochrane (Royal Navy officer, born 1874) (1874–1952), Royal Navy admiral
- Archibald Cochrane (Royal Navy officer, born 1783) (1783–1829), Royal Navy officer
- Archibald Cochrane (politician) (1885–1958), Scottish politician and naval officer
- Archibald Cochrane, 9th Earl of Dundonald (1748–1831), Scottish nobleman and inventor
- Archie Cochrane (1909–1988), British epidemiologist; namesake of the Cochrane Collaboration
