= George Cochrane (politician) =

Scottish soldier and politician

George Augustus Frederick Cochrane (born 26 November 1762) was a Scottish soldier and politician, a member of a large and adventurous aristocratic family. He served in Parliament from 1807 to 7 March 1808, and again from 10 May 1808 to July 1812.

Cochrane was the seventh surviving son of Thomas Cochrane, 8th Earl of Dundonald and his second wife Jane Stuart. As a younger son, he sought his fortune in the army; he was an ensign in 1783, a lieutenant in 1787, a captain in 1793, and a major and a lieutenant colonel in 1799. Cochrane resigned in 1805.

In 1807 Cochrane and his brother Andrew Cochrane-Johnstone were elected to Parliament from the rotten borough of Grampound with the assistance of their brother Basil's fortune. He was unseated the next year for lack of due property qualification, but re-elected the same year and seated after a disputed election. He initially voted with the radical opposition, following the line of his nephew Admiral Thomas Cochrane, but after 1810 he supported the Tory ministry of Spencer Perceval. He resigned in 1812 in favour of his brother Andrew. His life after Parliament is unclear; he was still alive in 1832.

== Family ==
The Earl of St. Vincent, Admiral of the Fleet, wrote of the Cochrane brothers in 1806, "The Cochranes are not to be trusted out of sight, they are all mad, romantic, money-getting and not truth-telling—and there is not a single exception in any part of the family." George Cochrane's eldest living brother, Archibald Cochrane, 9th Earl of Dundonald (1748–1831), was an inventor and entrepreneur. His brothers Basil (1753-1826) and John Cochrane (1750-1801) made fortunes as paymasters and victuallers. Alexander Cochrane (1758–1832) was an admiral. Andrew (1767–1833) was a soldier, businessman, and adventurer who fled the country after being convicted in the Great Stock Exchange Fraud of 1814.
