= John Cochrane (merchant) =

Scottish merchant (1750-1801)

- Born: 3 July 1750
- Died: 21 November 1801 (aged 51)
- Occupations: Merchant, East India Company writer, author
- Spouse: Selina Fitzroy Birch (m. 7 May 1800; both died 1801)
- Children: Nathaniel Day Cochrane, Angelica Cochrane, John Cochrane (illegitimate)
- Parent(s): Thomas Cochrane, 8th Earl of Dundonald (father); Jane Stuart (mother)
- Relatives: Archibald Cochrane, Basil Cochrane, Alexander Cochrane, George Cochrane, Andrew Cochrane-Johnstone (siblings); Thomas Cochrane, 10th Earl of Dundonald (nephew)

John Hyndford Cochrane (3 July 1750 – 21 November 1801) was a wealthy merchant and author from a notable Scottish aristocratic family.

John Cochrane was born in 1750, the second living son of Thomas Cochrane and Jane Stuart. His father was serving as a Commissioner of the Excise for Scotland at the time, but unexpectedly inherited the title of Earl of Dundonald in 1758 on the death of his younger cousin William Cochrane, 7th Earl of Dundonald.

John Cochrane was sent to India at the age of 16, obtaining an appointment as a clerk or Writer due to the influence of his uncles Andrew Stuart and James Stuart.

From 1779 to 1783, Cochrane acted as a deputy paymaster in British North America. In May 1783, Cochrane was sued by General Haldimand for refusing to sue merchants himself for amounts owed the Crown for bills of exchange; Cochrane and the merchants lost in the provincial courts, a painful loss which demonstrated to the merchants the need for a better legal system in Quebec.

From 1790 to 1792, Cochrane held the contract for victualling the British fleet in India. In 1792, he signed over the contract to his brother Basil, returning to London to be his brother's agent there.

In 1793 Cochrane was appointed as Deputy Commissary for North Britain.

== Personal life ==
In addition to his fellow nabob Basil, John Cochrane's siblings included Archibald (1748–1831), the eldest son and 9th Earl of Dundonald; Admiral Alexander Cochrane (1758–1832); George, a soldier and MP; and Andrew (1767–1833), an adventurer and MP who was disgraced in the Great Stock Exchange Fraud of 1814. Thomas Cochrane, 10th Earl of Dundonald, a nephew, was a famous naval commander who died with the title Admiral of the Red.

The Earl of St. Vincent, Admiral of the Fleet, wrote of the Cochrane brothers in 1806, "The Cochranes are not to be trusted out of sight, they are all mad, romantic, money-getting and not truth-telling—and there is not a single exception in any part of the family."

Cochrane reputedly had at least three illegitimate children. With Geneviève Dulan in Quebec he had Admiral Nathaniel Day Cochrane (1780–1844) and Angelica Cochrane (1782–1834); he also sired John Cochrane (1798–1878), a notable lawyer in India and chess player.

Cochrane married Selina Fitzroy Birch (born c. 1769) on 7 May 1800; Selina and an infant son died a month before Cochrane the following year.

A portrait of Cochrane exists, by portraitist Lemuel Francis Abbott.

== Publications ==
Cochrane wrote several long pamphlets on subjects of interest to him:

- Examination of the Plans Proposed for the East India Company's Shipping; the Great Importance of Adopting a Proper System Explained; and a Plan Suggested for Making the Ships Employed in the Commerce with Asia, Beneficial Both to the State and to the East India Company - London, John Stockdale, 1795
- The Seaman's Guide: Shewing how to Live Comfortably at Sea. Containing, Among Other Particulars, Complete Directions for Baking Bread, ... Recommended Also to Public Bakers, as Well as to Private Housekeepers - J. Murray and S. Highley, 1797.
