= James Gilchrist =

James Gilchrist may refer to:

- Jim Gilchrist (born 1949), American activist and co-founder, along with Chris Simcox, of the Minuteman Project Inc.
- James W. Gilchrist (born 1965), Maryland politician
- James Gilchrist (tenor), British tenor
- James Gordon Gilchrist (born 1928), Canadian Member of Parliament
- James Gilchrist (tennis) (1919–2004), Australian tennis player
- James Gilchrist (Royal Navy officer) (died 1777), British navy captain
- James Gilchrist (rugby union), Scotland international rugby union player
