= Andrew Cochrane-Johnstone =

Scottish soldier, politician, swindler and adventurer

- Born: Andrew Cochrane; 24 May 1767; Edinburgh, Scotland
- Died: 21 August 1833; Paris, France
- Children: John Dundas Cochrane (son); Elizabeth Cochrane (daughter)
- Relatives: Thomas Cochrane, 8th Earl of Dundonald (father); Archibald Cochrane, 9th Earl of Dundonald (brother); John Cochrane (brother); Basil Cochrane (brother); Alexander Cochrane (brother)
- Military career
- Allegiance: Great Britain; United Kingdom
- Branch: British Army
- Service years: 1783–1805
- Rank: Colonel
- Units: 23rd Light Dragoons; 19th Light Dragoons; 60th Regiment of Foot; 79th Regiment of Foot
- Commands: 8th West India Regiment
- Other work: MP for Stirling Burghs (1791–97); Governor of Dominica (1797–1803); MP for Grampound (1807–08, 1812–14)

Andrew James Cochrane-Johnstone (24 May 1767 – 21 August 1833) was a Scottish soldier, politician, swindler and adventurer who was found guilty of participation in the Great Stock Exchange Fraud of 1814. He was born in Edinburgh, Scotland.

== Life ==
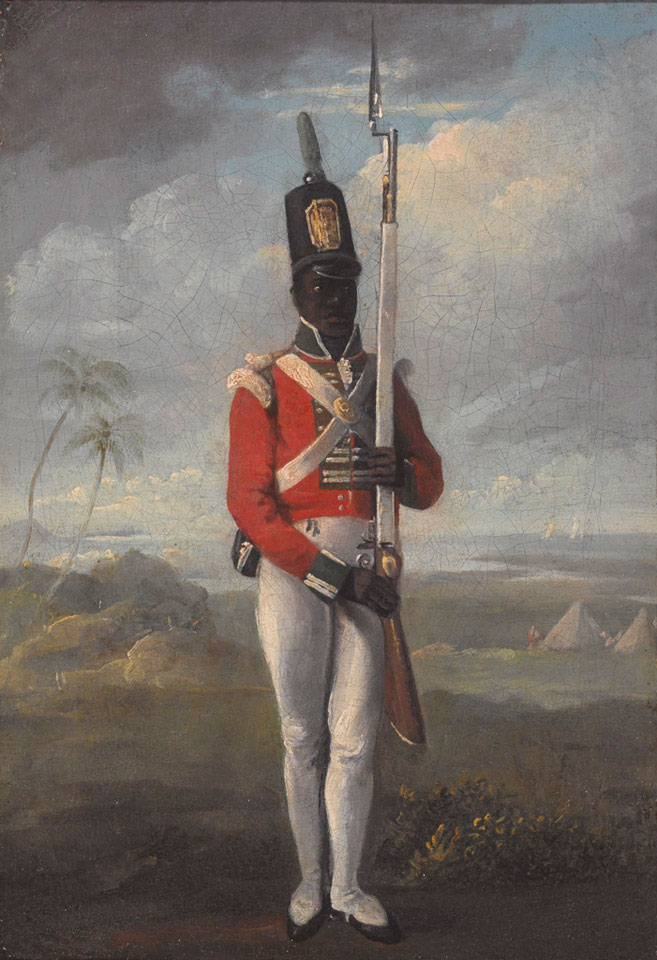
A private of the 8th West India Regiment, c. 1803. The regiment mutinied in 1802, which Cochrane-Johnstone suppressed.

Born Andrew Cochrane in 1767, at 'Belleville', a house near Holyrood Palace in Edinburgh, he was the youngest son of Thomas Cochrane, 8th Earl of Dundonald (1691–1778) and his second wife Jane Stuart (1722–1808). He became a cornet in the British Army in 1783. After returning from India to recover his health, he was elected to Parliament from Stirling Boroughs in 1791. In November 1793 he married Georgiana Hope-Johnstone, a daughter of James Hope-Johnstone, 3rd Earl of Hopetoun; she died in 1797. Cochrane added "Johnstone" to his name at the time of their marriage. Despite the opposition of Henry Dundas to his election in 1791, Cochrane-Johnstone supported the government of William Pitt the Younger, and was re-elected in 1796 in a race against his cousin Sir John Henderson, who was in opposition. In 1794 he was promoted to Lieutenant Colonel, and in 1797 was promoted to Colonel and then made Governor of Dominica (which terminated his position as M.P.)

Cochrane-Johnstone served as governor on Dominica until 1803; an 1802 mutiny by the 8th West India Regiment was quelled with severity, but led to a court-martial of the governor on charges of embezzlement, arbitrary rule, using soldiers for private servants, and other charges. The court-martial in 1805 cleared Cochrane-Johnstone, but his military career was over.

He had married Amelia Constance Gertrude Etienette de Clugny, a widow of Godet des Marais and the only child of a French governor of Guadeloupe, in February 1803; they were forced by Napoleon to divorce in May 1805.

In 1807 Cochrane-Johnstone was elected MP for Grampound in Cornwall, a notorious rotten borough, along with his brother George, reputedly financed by their wealthy brother Basil. He was disqualified in March 1808 for lack of property. By then he had gone to the West Indies where he lived in the customs house in Tortola, which was under the command of another brother, Admiral Alexander Cochrane. Made an agent and auctioneer for the navy in the conquest of some of the other Danish islands, Cochrane through bribery and fraud illegally obtained captured goods; arrested, he escaped to England with his profits.

One of his next business ventures (1809) involved manufacturing muskets for the Spanish government; in the course of this he engaged in smuggling and defrauded several of the Spanish colonial governments by failing to deliver promised armaments.

Cochrane-Johnstone returned to Parliament in July 1812 after his brother George resigned in his favour; this was perhaps an expedient to avoid debtors. He was elected on his own account from Grampound in the same year, after a deal with fellow MP John Teed.

In February 1814 Cochrane-Johnstone was one of the chief organisers of the Great Stock Exchange Fraud of 1814; Cochrane-Johnstone and other associates purchased government securities just before spreading a false rumour of the death of Napoleon. At the news of Napoleon's death, the value of the securities rose dramatically, at which point the conspirators sold them again: Cochrane-Johnstone was believed to have profited to the tune of £4,931 (approx. £450,000 in modern terms). He was convicted of fraud and fled to France; he was expelled from Parliament on 5 July 1814. Cochrane-Johnstone's nephew Admiral Thomas Cochrane was also convicted; although he claimed innocence and the public was on his side, he was forced to resign and did not return to the British Navy until 1832. Cochrane-Johnstone fled to the West Indies, where he discovered that his property in Dominica had been seized, although he was able to take slaves from his plantation to a new establishment, a coffee plantation in Dutch Demerara. By 1829 he was living in Paris, France and fraudulent claims by him on the French government were being exposed. It was there (at 96, rue du Faubourg St Honoré) that he died in poverty in August 1833.

The Earl of St. Vincent, Admiral of the Fleet, a Whig, wrote of the Cochrane brothers in 1806, "The Cochranes are not to be trusted out of sight, they are all mad, romantic, money-getting and not truth-telling—and there is not a single exception in any part of the family."

== Family ==
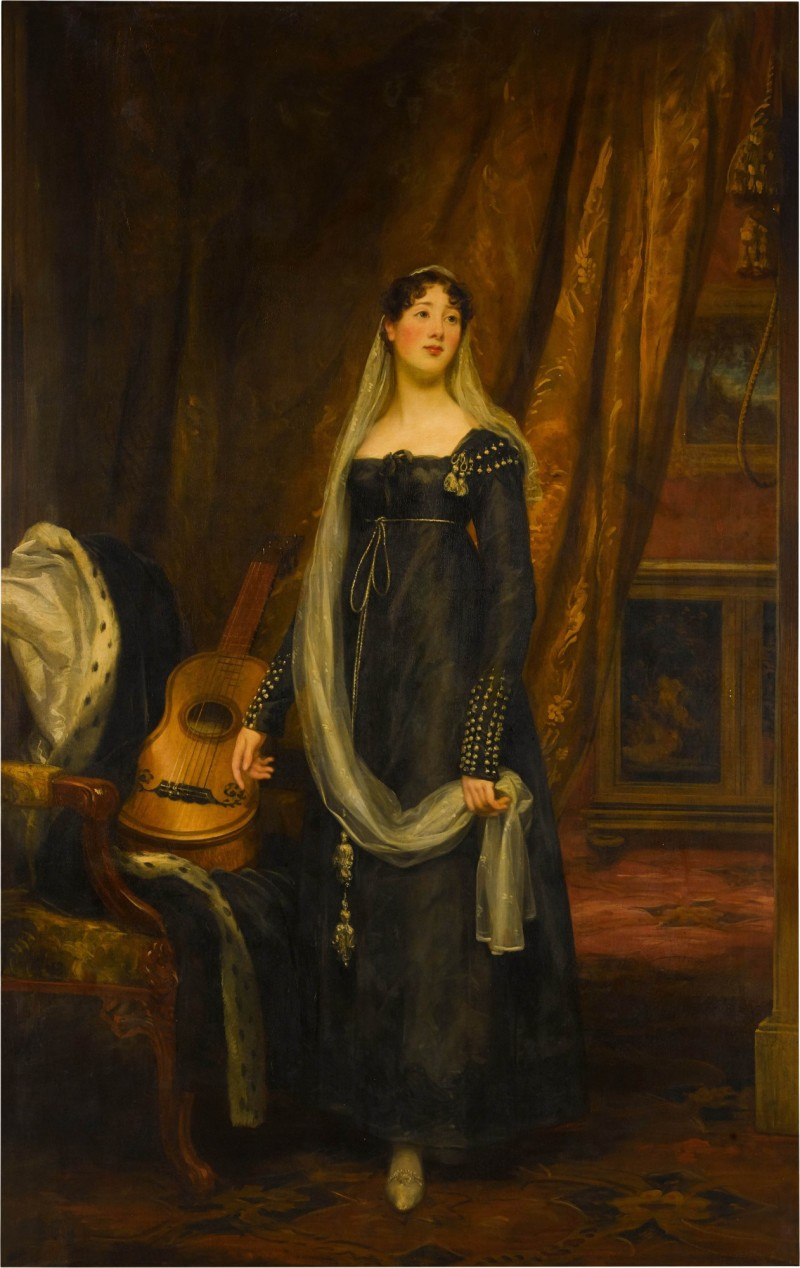
Portrait of Elizabeth Cochrane-Johnstone, age 17, by Thomas Phillips

Cochrane-Johnstone had an illegitimate son, Captain John Dundas Cochrane (February 1793 – August 1825), an explorer who published a Pedestrian Journey through Russian and Siberian Tartary in 1824. It is not proven, but is likely that John's mother was Georgiana Hope-Johnstone, who married Andrew nine months after John's birth. Andrew and Georgiana also had one daughter, Elizabeth Cochrane-Johnstone (26 December 1784 – 6 June 1883); she married William Napier, 9th Lord Napier in 1816.

Parliament of Great Britain
Preceded by Archibald Campbell	Member of Parliament for Stirling Burghs; 1791–1797	Succeeded by William Tait
Parliament of the United Kingdom
Preceded by Henry Fawcett; Sir Christopher Hawkins, Bt	Member of Parliament for Grampound; 1807–1808; With: Hon. George Cochrane	Succeeded by John Teed; Robert Williams
Preceded by William Holmes; Hon. George Cochrane	Member of Parliament for Grampound; July 1812 – 1814; With: William Holmes to October 1812; John Teed from October 1812	Succeeded by John Teed; Ebenezer Collett
