= Basil Cochrane =

Scottish civil servant (1753–1826)

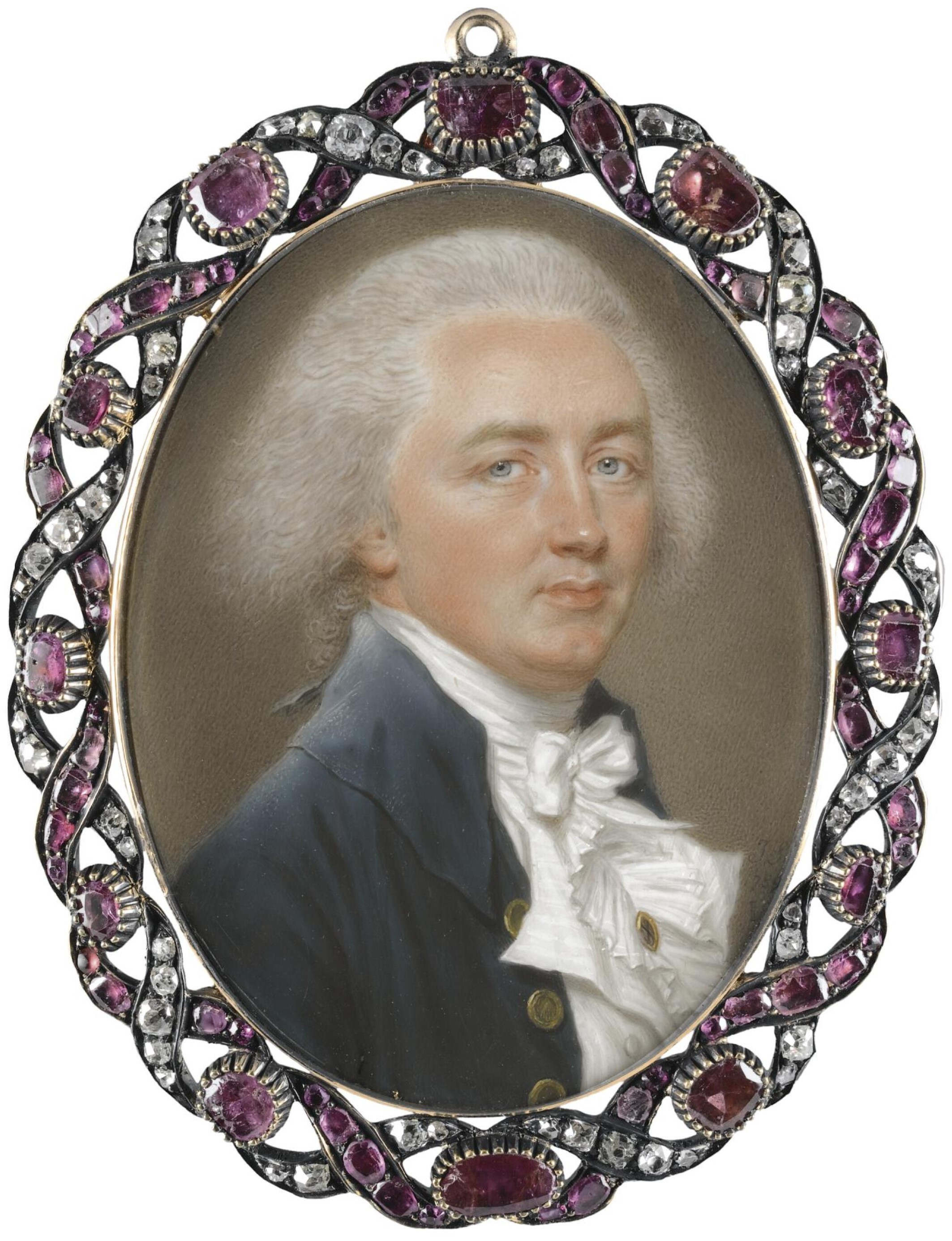
Portrait by John Smart, 1789

Basil Cochrane (22 April 1753 – 12 or 14 August 1826 in Paris, France) was a Scottish civil servant, businessman, inventor, and wealthy nabob of early-19th-century England.

== Early life ==
The sixth son of Scottish nobleman and politician Thomas Cochrane, 8th Earl of Dundonald, by his second wife Jane Stuart, Cochrane was probably named for his father's brother Basil Cochrane (died 1788), at the time Governor of the Isle of Man and later a member of the Scottish Board of Customs. At the age of sixteen Basil was given a place in the East India Company in Madras. From 1783–5 he served as a revenue administrator in Nagapattinam, which had been seized from the Dutch in 1781. During his time there he was accused of having two locals, including one named Vaidyanada, beaten to death. After a trial in Madras in 1787, he was acquitted by a British jury.

== Nabob ==
In 1792 Basil Cochrane took over supply contracts for the British navy in India from his brother John, who had held them since 1790. The demand for provisions was so great that Basil had flour mills and bakeries built at Calcutta and Madras to fulfill his contracts. He also financed "Cochrane's Canal" (now the Buckingham Canal) which improved navigation to Madras. The contract was rebid in 1803 and Cochrane again won the bid.

In 1806 Cochrane handed over the contracts to the partnership of James Baker and James Balfour. He returned to England, having accumulated an enormous fortune (he had held contracts over the years totalling £1,418,236) to spend the next thirteen years disputing his accounts with the Victualling Board. He built a large house at 12 Portman Square, where he was able to socialise with his brother Andrew Cochrane-Johnstone, his nephew Lord Cochrane, and others. In 1807 he financed the campaigns of his brothers Andrew and George in the notorious rotten borough of Grampound to place them in Parliament, perhaps to increase pressure on the government to settle his accounts. He purchased, with partner George Hunter, the Scottish estate of Auchterarder in 1808 and assumed the titles. After Cochrane's accounts were settled in 1819, he published several works criticising the Victualing Board's conduct towards him and calling for reforms in the process.

== Family and children ==
While in India, Cochrane had six children with a woman named Lucy Sutton: Jane (1799-1875), George (1800-1875), Maria (1801-1830), Alexander (1803-1884), Thomas (1805-1873), and Charles (1807-1855). Thomas moved to Brazil and became a successful homeopathic physician and businessman. Charles became an author and social reformer in London.

With Elizabeth Caunter (1786-1843) Cochrane had William Stuart Cochrane (born 1808). With Ann Julian he had Archibald Richard Basil Cochrane (1810-1893).

Basil Cochrane married Caroline Gostling (died 1837), widow of Rev. Samuel Lawry, in 1812; they had no children. Cochrane died in Paris in 1826 and is buried in Père Lachaise Cemetery there. A portrait miniature of Cochrane exists, painted in 1789 in India by John Smart.

== Vapour baths ==
Cochrane published several works promoting the use of "vapour baths" or steam baths for medical purposes, with apparatus that he had improved on himself. He also had a steam bath installed at his house in Portman Square and allowed the public to use it. Cochrane employed Indian immigrant Sake Dean Mahomed, who may have been the one to introduce Indian "shampooing" or massage to England there. (The term "shampoo" later came to mean the special soap used in massaging the scalp.)

== The Cochranes ==
The Earl of St Vincent, Admiral of the Fleet, wrote of the Cochrane brothers in 1806, "The Cochranes are not to be trusted out of sight, they are all mad, romantic, money-getting and not truth-telling—and there is not a single exception in any part of the family." Basil Cochrane's eldest living brother, Archibald Cochrane, 9th Earl of Dundonald (1748–1831), was an inventor and entrepreneur. John Cochrane (1750–1801) had a similar career to Basil and worked with him to make their fortunes in India. Alexander Cochrane (1758–1832) was an admiral. Andrew (1767–1833) was a soldier, businessman, and adventurer who fled the country after being convicted in the Great Stock Exchange Fraud of 1814.

James Boswell, the famous diarist and biographer of Samuel Johnson, was a grandson of Euphemia Cochrane, sister of Basil's father Thomas and his namesake Commissioner Basil Cochrane. Boswell visited his Cochrane relatives and exchanged letters, but did not mention the younger Basil Cochrane, perhaps because he was 13 years younger and left for India in 1769 at the age of 16.

== The Stuarts ==
Basil Cochrane had two notable uncles on his mother's side, Andrew Stuart, a lawyer and MP, and Major General James Stuart, who had a turbulent military career in India from 1775–1782.

== Works ==
- An Improvement on the Mode of Administering the Vapour Bath... (1809)
- Addenda to 'An Improvement on the Mode of Administering the Vapour Bath' (1810)
- A Narrative of the Transactions of the Hon. Basil Cochrane... (1818)
- A Statement on the Conduct of the Victualing Board... (1820)
- An Historical Digest of the Reports of Commissioners Appointed to Inquire into Abuses in the Public Department of Government... (1824)
- The Vapour Bath in Miniature: Recommended by More Than Seventy Eminent Medical Gentlemen... (1825)
