= James Gilchrist (Royal Navy officer) =

British Royal Navy captain

Captain James Gilchrist
- Died: 1777
- Occupation: Royal Navy captain

James Gilchrist (died 1777) was a British Royal Navy captain.

== Biography ==
Gilchrist was promoted to be a lieutenant in the navy on 28 August 1741, and in 1749 was serving in the Namur when, on 12 April, she was lost with all hands on board. As only those who were on shore with the admiral, or sick in hospital, escaped, it would seem probable that Gilchrist was Boscawen's flag-lieutenant. When the news of the peace was confirmed, he was sent home in command of the Basilisk bomb, bringing the few survivors. He arrived at Plymouth on 17 April 1750, putting in there on account of the inclemency of the weather, which the men were unable to stand, being, he wrote, entirely naked. On 18 July 1755 he was advanced to post-rank and appointed to the Experiment frigate, which he joined on 8 August. In September he was sent over to the coast of France, where in eleven days he captured no fewer than sixteen, mostly small, vessels. In the beginning of 1756 he was sent into the Mediterranean, where he joined Admiral Byng, and was present at the action off Minorca on 20 May. He was afterwards appointed by Sir Edward Hawke, in rapid succession to the Chesterfield, the Deptford, and the Trident; was then sent home as a witness at the trial of Admiral Byng, and in April 1757 was appointed to the Southampton, a 32-gun frigate, in which, off Portland, on 25 July, he fought a severe action with two French frigates of superior force (Laughton, Studies in Naval history, p. 333), and succeeded in beating them off. With better fortune he met, on 12 September, the French frigate Émeraude, which he captured after a sharp action of thirty-five minutes' duration, and brought into Falmouth. During the following year he was still employed in Channel service, in the course of which he captured two large privateers; and on 28 March 1759, being in company with Captain Hotham in the Melampe [see Hotham, William, Lord], on a cruise in the North sea, met and engaged the 40-gun French frigate Danae, which, after a hard-fought action, lasting all through the night, struck her flag in the morning. Gilchrist was shot through the shoulder by a one-pound ball, a wound that for the time endangered his life, and rendered his arm permanently useless. He never served again, but lived in retirement at his family seat of Hunsfield in Lanarkshire, where he died in 1777. One of his daughters married the ninth earl of Dundonald, and was the mother of Thomas Cochrane, tenth earl of Dundonald.
