= Nathaniel Day Cochrane =

Rear-Admiral Nathaniel Day Cochrane
- Born: c. 22 November 1780; Québec, Province of Quebec
- Died: 16 November 1844 (aged 63); Bathford, Somerset
- Military career
- Allegiance: Great Britain; United Kingdom
- Branch: Royal Navy
- Service years: 1794–1814
- Rank: Rear-Admiral
- Commands: HMS Kingfisher; HMS Alexandria; HMS Orontes; HMS Asia
- Conflicts: French Revolutionary Wars; Napoleonic Wars; Battle of San Domingo

Nathaniel Day Cochrane (bapt. 22 November 1780 – 16 November 1844) was a British naval officer.

He was born in Québec, the illegitimate son of Paymaster Hon. John Cochrane, third (surviving) son of Thomas Cochrane, 8th Earl of Dundonald, and Geneviève Dulan. Nathaniel had a sister, Angelica, a brother, Colonel James Johnson Cochrane of the 3rd Guards, and a half-brother (probably) John Cochrane, a lawyer. This John Cochrane may have been John Cochrane the well-known chess master.

Cochrane entered the Navy in 1794 and received a promotion to Lieutenant in 1800. In 1805 he was promoted to Commander and assumed command of Kingfisher. While on the West Indies Station he captured several vessels before bringing news to Sir John Thomas Duckworth's squadron that three French ships of the line had been sighted sailing towards Santo Domingo. He was posted with date of seniority of 26 March 1806, on his return to England with the news of the Battle of San Domingo (which his uncle Admiral Alexander Cochrane had fought in.) He subsequently commanded the frigates Alexandria and Orontes on the North Sea and Cape of Good Hope stations. In 1812 he took command of the 74-gun third-rate ship of the line Asia, and remained her commander until 1814.

On 23 November 1841 he was promoted to Rear-Admiral of the Blue.

Rear Admiral Cochrane died on 16 November 1844 at his brother's house at Bathford, Somerset. He never married, but had an illegitimate daughter, Emily (born 1825; died a spinster 1919).
