= Archibald Cochrane, 9th Earl of Dundonald =

British military officer and inventor

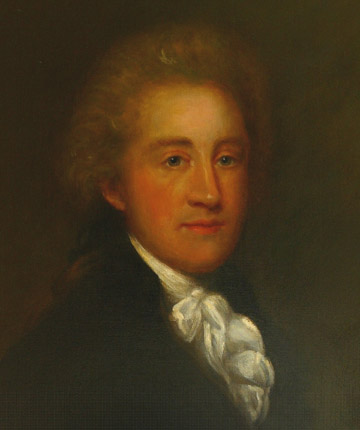
A portrait of Dundonald

Archibald Cochrane, 9th Earl of Dundonald, FRSE (1 January 1748 – 1 July 1831) was a British aristocrat, military officer, and inventor. His most notable inventions were the utilisation of coal byproducts.

== Life ==
The son of Thomas Cochrane, 8th Earl of Dundonald, he joined the British Army as a youth and also served time in the Royal Navy before returning to Culross in 1778 after inheriting the Earldom of Dundonald from his father. He inherited a title and family lands but little money. Left with no other means of support, Archibald turned to invention.

Cochrane's most noted invention was a method for making coal tar (patented in 1781) on an industrial scale. The British Tar Company invested in a works; it was managed by John Loudon McAdam. The coke byproduct was used, in part, by an ironworks at Muirkirk, and the flammability of the coal gas byproduct was recognised but not capitalized on. McAdam bought the company, but the deal was troubled.

Cochrane hoped that he would be able to sell tar as a sealant for the hulls of ships to the Royal Navy. After contacts with the British Admiralty were made, a test was performed on a buoy. The buoy was coated on one side and left uncoated on the other. After some time the uncoated half was leaking and full of worms and barnacles, while the treated half was in quite good condition. A patent for his invention was drawn up, while the family estates were used as collateral.

The coal tar technique was a rival to copper sheathing, preferred by the Admiralty. It has been argued that there were also powerful interests at play, shipyards needing the maintenance business. The patent expired, and the Royal Navy eventually adopted the tar mixture.

Other experiments with alum production, making bread from potatoes, and paint manufacturing also proved unprofitable. His experiments with producing soda from table salt proved more successful but were not enough to reverse his financial misfortunes.

In 1784, close to the Society's inception, he was elected a Fellow of the Royal Society of Edinburgh. His proposers were James Hutton and Adam Smith. In 1795, he was elected an International Member of the American Philosophical Society.

Cochrane died impoverished in Paris at the age of 83. The earldom of Dundonald passed to his son Thomas Cochrane.

== Family ==
He married three times. His first wife was Anne Gilchrist, daughter of Captain James Gilchrist, whom he married in 1774. After her death, he married Isabella Mayne, a widow and daughter of Samuel Raymond, in 1788. His third wife was Anna Maria Plowden, daughter of Francis Plowden whom he married in 1819. He had four sons: Thomas Cochrane, who succeeded him in the earldom, was a highly successful officer in the Royal Navy, a less-successful politician, and key early leader of several navies of newly independent countries; Basil Cochrane who briefly served in the Royal Navy before transferring to the British Army; William Erskine Cochrane who served in the British Army; and Archibald Cochrane who also served in the Royal Navy.

== Potatoes ==
In February 1791 Dundonald published details of his experiments in making bread using potatoes in a booklet made up of three letters. By March 1791 he had also published a pamphlet on feeding the poor by adding starch and potato powder to flour. A print by James Gillray from 1795 entitled "Substitutes for bread; or Right Honourables saving the Loaves and Dividing the Fishes" satirises the notion that potato is a delicious alternative for flour by showing a group of MPs avoiding potato bread and instead eating fish and sirloin steaks covered in coins.

== The Cochrane brothers ==
Cochrane's younger brothers also had notable careers. Charles Cochrane (1749-1781) served as a major in the British Legion during the American Revolution; John Cochrane (1750-1801) and Basil Cochrane (1753-1826) were supply contractors for the British Army and navy; Basil in particular made a fortune providing supplies to the navy in India. Alexander Cochrane (1758-1832) became an admiral. George Cochrane (b. 1762) served in the army and in Parliament. Andrew (1767-1833) was an army officer, colonial governor, member of Parliament, and fraudster.

The Earl of St. Vincent, Admiral of the Fleet, wrote of the Cochrane brothers in 1806, "The Cochranes are not to be trusted out of sight, they are all mad, romantic, money-getting and not truth-telling—and there is not a single exception in any part of the family."

Peerage of Scotland
Preceded by Thomas Cochrane	Earl of Dundonald; 1778–1831	Succeeded by Thomas Cochrane
