= Archibald Cochrane (Royal Navy officer, born 1783) =

Captain The Honourable Archibald Cochrane
- Born: 1783; Great Britain
- Died: 6 August 1829 (aged 45–46); Paris, France
- Military career
- Allegiance: Great Britain; United Kingdom
- Branch: Royal Navy
- Service years: 1790s–1829
- Rank: Captain
- Commands: HMS Fox 1807 to 1811
- Conflicts: French Revolutionary Wars; Capture of Gamo; Napoleonic Wars; Raid on Griessie

Captain Archibald Cochrane was a Royal Navy officer who served in the French Revolutionary and Napoleonic Wars. His most noticeable activity came early in his career as a midshipman aboard HMS Speedy, which was then captained by his brother, Commander Thomas Cochrane (known as Lord Cochrane). Aboard Speedy, Cochrane participated in the engagement and capture of the Spanish frigate Gamo, which was more than three times the size of the British ship. Although captured by the French shortly afterwards, Cochrane's career continued successfully and he was promoted to lieutenant in 1804, sailing to the East Indies on HMS Victor and rapidly gaining promotion to post captain in the frigate HMS Fox. In 1811, Cochrane returned to Europe and did not serve again, retiring to Sunderland and dying in 1829.

== Life ==
Archibald Cochrane was born in 1783, the son of Archibald Cochrane, 9th Earl of Dundonald and his first wife Anna Gilchrist. Archibald had two elder brothers, Thomas Cochrane and William Erskine Cochrane, both of whom would have successful military careers, Thomas in the Royal Navy and William in the British Army. Sent to sea at a young age, by 1799 Archibald was serving alongside Thomas, styled Lord Cochrane, as a midshipman in the ship of the line HMS Barfleur, flagship of Lord Keith in the Mediterranean. Following the capture of the French ship of the line Genereux in February 1800, Lord Cochrane was placed in temporary command of the prize and took his younger brother aboard as part of the prize crew. The ship passed through a severe storm on the voyage to Port Mahon, and was almost sunk, the Cochrane brothers forced to climb the mainmast alone at the height of the storm to reef the sails.

For his exertions, Lord Cochrane was promoted to commander and given command of the 14-gun sloop HMS Speedy, again taking his brother aboard. Archibald Cochrane was involved in most of his brother's successful operations during the following year, including the capture of the Spanish frigate Gamo on 6 May 1801. Attacked by the much larger warship, Cochrane took his tiny vessel alongside, and the Spanish sailors could not depress their guns sufficiently to open fire on it. Leading a boarding party, Archibald assisted in the fighting on deck and the successful capture of the ship. He later participated in a landing operation at Oropesa del Mar, but was captured when Speedy was seized by a French squadron under Charles Linois on 3 July 1801.

In 1804, during the Napoleonic Wars, Cochrane was promoted to lieutenant, sailing for the East Indies in the sloop HMS Victor. Rapidly promoted, by 1807 he was post captain in command of the frigate HMS Fox and participated in the Raid on Griessie against the Dutch port of Griessie on Java in December. Cochrane remained in the East Indies until 1811, when he returned to Britain and was not employed at sea again. He married in 1812 to Jane Mowbray and had six children, the family retiring to Sunderland, where he was respected in the community. He died in 1829 in Paris.
