= Thomas Cochrane, 10th Earl of Dundonald =

British naval officer, politician and mercenary (1775–1860)

Admiral The Right Honourable The Earl of Dundonald GCB
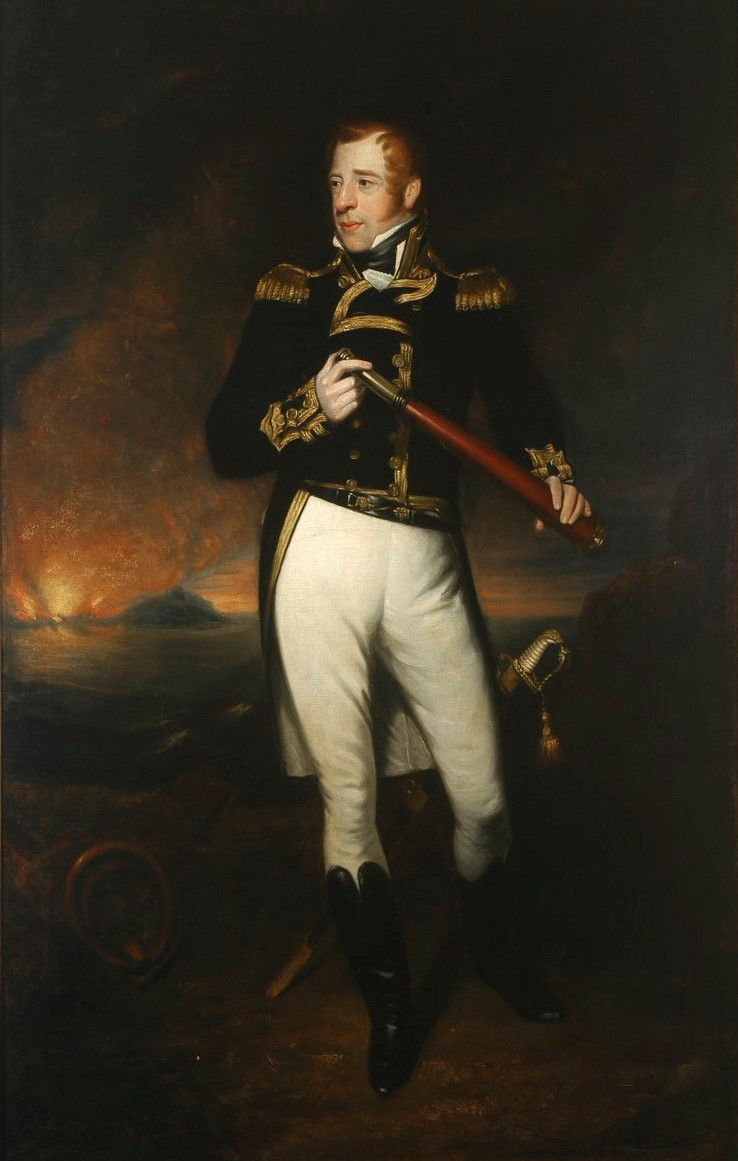
- Portrait by James Ramsay, c. 1830

Member of Parliament for Honiton
- In office 1806–1807
- Preceded by: Richard Bateman-Robson
- Succeeded by: Sir Charles Hamilton

Member of Parliament for Westminster
- In office 1807–1818
- Preceded by: Richard Brinsley Sheridan
- Succeeded by: Samuel Romilly

Personal details
- Born: 14 December 1775 Lanarkshire, Scotland
- Died: 31 October 1860 (aged 84) Kensington, London, England
- Party: Whig; Radical
- Spouse: Katherine ("Katy") Frances Corbet Barne
- Children: 6
- Education: University of Edinburgh
- Awards: Order of the Merit of Chile; Order of the Southern Cross
- Nickname(s): Le Loup des Mers (The Sea Wolf); El Diablo (The Devil) (Note: Cochrane claimed that the Spanish nicknamed him El Diablo (The Devil), but there is no concrete evidence.); El Metálico Lord (The Metallic Lord)

Military service
- Allegiance: Great Britain; United Kingdom; Republic of Chile; Empire of Brazil; First Hellenic Republic
- Branch/service: Royal Navy; Chilean Navy; Imperial Brazilian Navy; Hellenic Navy
- Years of service: 1793–1860
- Rank: Admiral of the Red (Royal Navy)
- Commands: North America and West Indies Station
- Battles/wars: French Revolutionary Wars; Action of 6 May 1801; Raid on Oropesa; Napoleonic Wars; Peninsular War; Barcelona Blockade; Siege of Roses; Battle of the Basque Roads; Chilean War of Independence; Capture of Valdivia; Peruvian War of Independence; Liberating Expedition of Peru; First Blockade of Callao; Second Blockade of Callao; Third Blockade of Callao; Capture of the frigate Esmeralda; First siege of Callao; Brazilian War of Independence; Siege of Salvador; Battle of 4 May; Siege of São Luís; Greek War of Independence; Second Siege of Athens; Battle of Phaleron

Admiral Thomas Cochrane, 10th Earl of Dundonald, Marquess of Maranhão GCB (14 December 1775 – 31 October 1860), styled Lord Cochrane between 1778 and 1831, was a British naval officer, politician and mercenary. Serving during the French Revolutionary and Napoleonic Wars in the Royal Navy, his naval successes led Napoleon to nickname him le Loup des Mers (the Sea Wolf). He was successful in virtually all his naval actions.

Cochrane was dismissed from the Royal Navy in 1814 after a controversial conviction for fraud on the London Stock Exchange. Travelling to South America, he helped to organise and lead the revolutionary navies of Chile and of Brazil during their respective wars of independence during the 1820s. While commanding the Chilean Navy Cochrane also contributed to Peruvian independence through his participation in the Liberating Expedition of Peru. He was also hired to help the Greek Revolutionary Navy during the Greek War of Independence, but ultimately had little impact. In 1832 Cochrane was pardoned by the Crown and reinstated in the Royal Navy with the rank of Rear-Admiral of the Blue. After several more promotions, he died in 1860 with the rank of Admiral of the Red, and the honorary title of Rear-Admiral of the United Kingdom.

Cochrane's life and exploits inspired the naval fiction of 19th- and 20th-century novelists, particularly the fictional characters C. S. Forester's Horatio Hornblower and Patrick O'Brian's Jack Aubrey.

== Family ==
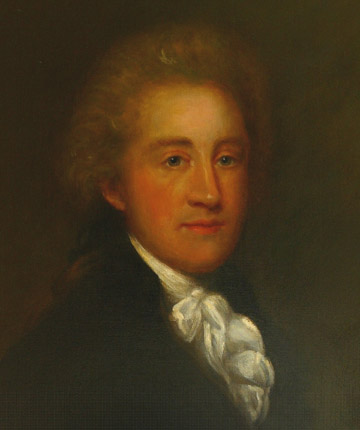
Cochrane's father, the 9th Earl of Dundonald (1748–1831)

Thomas Cochrane was born at Annsfield, near Hamilton, South Lanarkshire, Scotland. He was the son of Archibald, Lord Cochrane (1748–1831), who later became, in October 1778, the 9th Earl of Dundonald, and his wife, Anna Gilchrist. She was the daughter of Captain James Gilchrist and Ann Roberton, the daughter of Major John Roberton, 16th Laird of Earnock.

Thomas, Lord Cochrane, as he himself became in October 1778, had six brothers. Two served with distinction in the military: William Erskine Cochrane of the 15th Dragoons, who served under Sir John Moore in the Peninsular War and reached the rank of major; and Archibald Cochrane, who became a captain in the Navy.

Lord Cochrane was descended from lines of Scottish aristocracy and military service on both sides of his family. Through his uncle, Admiral Sir Alexander Cochrane, the sixth son of the 8th Earl of Dundonald, Cochrane was cousin to his namesake, Admiral of the Fleet Sir Thomas John Cochrane (1789–1872). Sir Thomas J. Cochrane also had a naval career and was appointed Governor of Newfoundland and later Vice-Admiral of the United Kingdom. By 1793, however, the Cochranes had fallen on hard times; with their fortune spent, the family estate was sold off to cover debts.

== Early life ==
Cochrane spent much of his early life in Culross, Fife, where his family had an estate.

Through the influence of his uncle Alexander Cochrane, he was listed as a member of the crew on the books of four Royal Navy ships starting when he was five years old. This common (though unlawful) practice, known as false muster, was a means of gaming naval regulations, enabling well-connected officers to attain the years of service required for promotion if and when they joined the Navy. Cochrane's father secured him a commission in the British Army at an early age, but Cochrane preferred the Navy. He joined it in 1793 upon the outbreak of the French Revolutionary Wars around the time his family lost their wealth and lands.

== Service in the Royal Navy ==
=== French Revolutionary wars ===
On 23 July 1793, aged 17, Cochrane joined the navy as a midshipman, spending his first months at Sheerness in the 28-gun sixth-rate frigate HMS Hind commanded by his uncle, Captain Alexander Cochrane. He transferred to the 38-gun fifth-rate HMS Thetis, also under his uncle's command. While aboard Thetis, he visited Norway and next served on the North America Station. In 1795 he was appointed acting lieutenant. The following year on 27 May 1796, he was commissioned lieutenant after passing the examination. After several transfers in North America and a return home in 1798, he was assigned as 8th Lieutenant on Lord Keith's flagship HMS Barfleur in the Mediterranean.

During his service on Barfleur, Cochrane was court-martialled for showing disrespect to Philip Beaver, the ship's first lieutenant. The board reprimanded him for flippancy. This was the first public manifestation of a pattern of Cochrane being unable to get along with many of his superiors, subordinates, employers and colleagues in several navies and Parliament, even those with whom he had much in common and who should have been natural allies. His behaviour led to a long enmity with Admiral of the Fleet John Jervis, 1st Earl of St Vincent.

In February 1800 Cochrane commanded the prize crew taking the captured French vessel Généreux to the British base at Mahón. The ship was almost lost in a storm, with Cochrane and his brother Archibald going aloft in place of crew who were mostly ill. Cochrane was promoted to commander and took command of the brig sloop HMS Speedy on 28 March 1800. Later that year, a Spanish warship disguised as a merchant ship almost captured him. He escaped by flying a Danish flag and fending off a boarding by claiming that his ship was plague-ridden. On another occasion, he was being chased by an enemy frigate and knew that it would follow him in the night by any glimmer of light from Speedy, so he placed a lantern on a barrel and let it float away. The enemy frigate followed the light, and Speedy escaped.

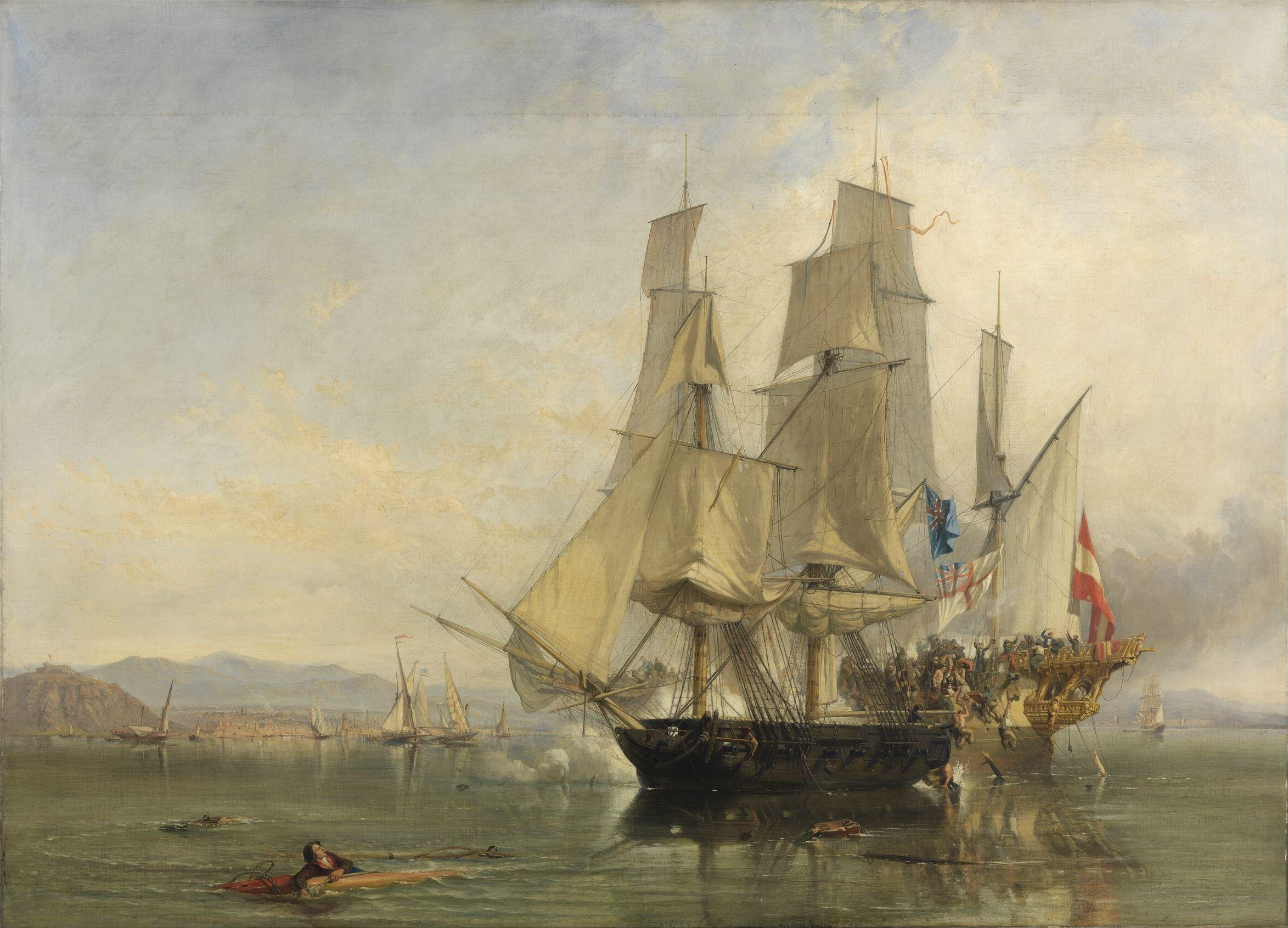
Speedy under Cochrane capturing El Gamo in the action of 6 May 1801

In February 1801 at Malta, Cochrane got into an argument with a French Royalist officer at a fancy dress ball. He had arrived dressed as a common sailor, and the Royalist mistook him for one. This argument led to Cochrane's only duel. Cochrane wounded the French officer with a pistol shot and was himself unharmed. One of his most notable exploits was the capture of the Spanish xebec frigate El Gamo on 6 May 1801. El Gamo carried 32 guns and 319 men, compared with Speedy's 14 guns and 54 men. Cochrane flew an American flag and approached so closely to El Gamo that her guns could not depress to fire on Speedy's hull. The Spanish tried to board and take over Speedy, but whenever they were about to board, Cochrane pulled away briefly and fired on the concentrated boarding parties with his ship's guns. Eventually, Cochrane boarded El Gamo and captured her, despite being outnumbered about six to one.

Cochrane then took part in the raid on Oropesa along with HMS Kangaroo on 9 June which saw the destruction of a Spanish convoy under the cover of a large on-shore battery. In Speedy's 13-month cruise Cochrane captured, burnt, or drove ashore 53 ships before three French ships of the line under Admiral Charles-Alexandre Léon Durand Linois captured Speedy on 3 July 1801. While Cochrane was held as a prisoner, Linois often asked him for advice. In his autobiography Cochrane recounted how courteous and polite Linois had been. A few days later he was exchanged for the second captain of another French ship. On 8 August 1801 he was promoted to captain.

=== Napoleonic Wars ===
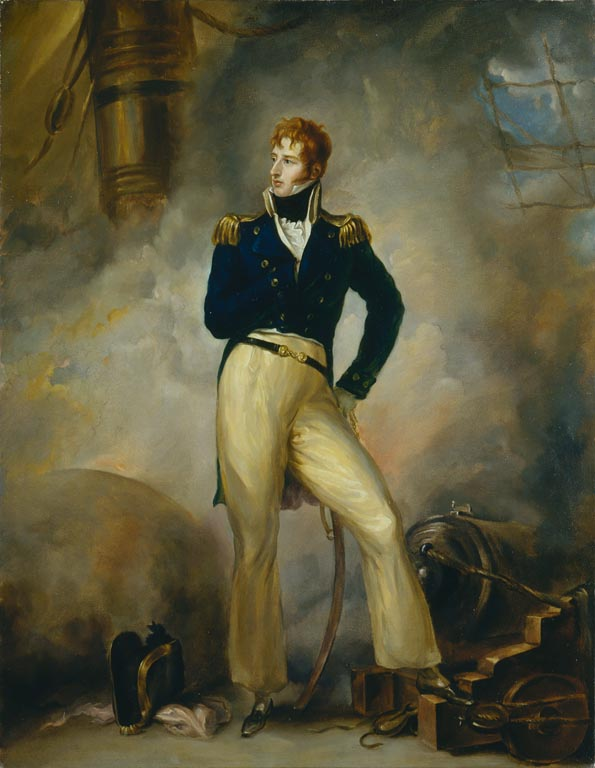
1951 copy by Archibald Eliot Haswell Miller of Peter Edward Stroehling's 1807 portrait of Cochrane

After the Peace of Amiens, Cochrane attended the University of Edinburgh. Upon the resumption of war in 1803, St Vincent assigned him in October 1803 to command the sixth-rate 22-gun HMS Arab. Cochrane alleged that the vessel handled poorly, colliding with Royal Navy ships on two occasions (Bloodhound and Abundance). In his autobiography, he compared Arab to a collier. He wrote that his first thoughts on seeing Arab being repaired at Plymouth were that she would "sail like a haystack". Despite this, he intercepted and boarded the American merchant ship Chatham. This created an international incident, for Britain was not at war with the United States. Arab and her commander were assigned to protect Britain's important whaling fleet beyond Orkney in the North Sea.

In 1804, Lord St Vincent stood aside for the incoming new government led by William Pitt the Younger, and Henry Dundas, 1st Viscount Melville, took office. In December of that year Cochrane was appointed to command of the new 32-gun frigate HMS Pallas. He undertook a series of notable exploits over the following eighteen months, among them a cruise in the vicinity of the Azores, where Pallas captured three Spanish merchant ships and a Spanish 14-gun privateer.

In August 1806, he took command of the 38-gun frigate HMS Imperieuse, formerly the Spanish frigate Medea. One of his midshipmen was Frederick Marryat, who later wrote fictionalised accounts of his adventures with Cochrane.

In Imperieuse Cochrane raided the Mediterranean coast of France during the continuing Napoleonic Wars. In 1808 Cochrane and a Spanish guerrilla force captured the fortress of Mongat, which straddled the road between Gerona and Barcelona. This delayed General Duhesme's French army for a month. On another raid, Cochrane copied code books from a signal station, leaving behind the originals so that the French would believe them uncompromised. When Imperieuse ran short of water, she sailed up the estuary of the Rhone to replenish. A French army marched into Catalonia and besieged Rosas, and Cochrane took part in the defence of the town. He occupied and defended Fort Trinidad (Castell de la Trinitat) for a number of weeks before the fall of the city forced him to leave; Cochrane was one of the last two men to quit the fort.

While captain of Speedy, Pallas, and Imperieuse, Cochrane became an effective practitioner of coastal warfare during the period. He attacked shore installations such as the Martello tower at Son Bou on Menorca, and he captured enemy ships in harbour by leading his men in boats. He was a meticulous planner of every operation, which limited casualties among his men and maximised the chances of success.

In 1809 Cochrane commanded the attack by a flotilla of fire ships on Rochefort, as part of the Battle of the Basque Roads. The attack did considerable damage, but Cochrane blamed fleet commander Admiral Gambier for missing the opportunity to destroy the French fleet, accusations that resulted in Gambier undergoing a court-martial. Cochrane claimed that, as a result of expressing his opinion publicly, the Admiralty denied him the opportunity to serve at sea. However, documents show that Cochrane was focused on politics at this time and refused offers of command.

== Political career ==
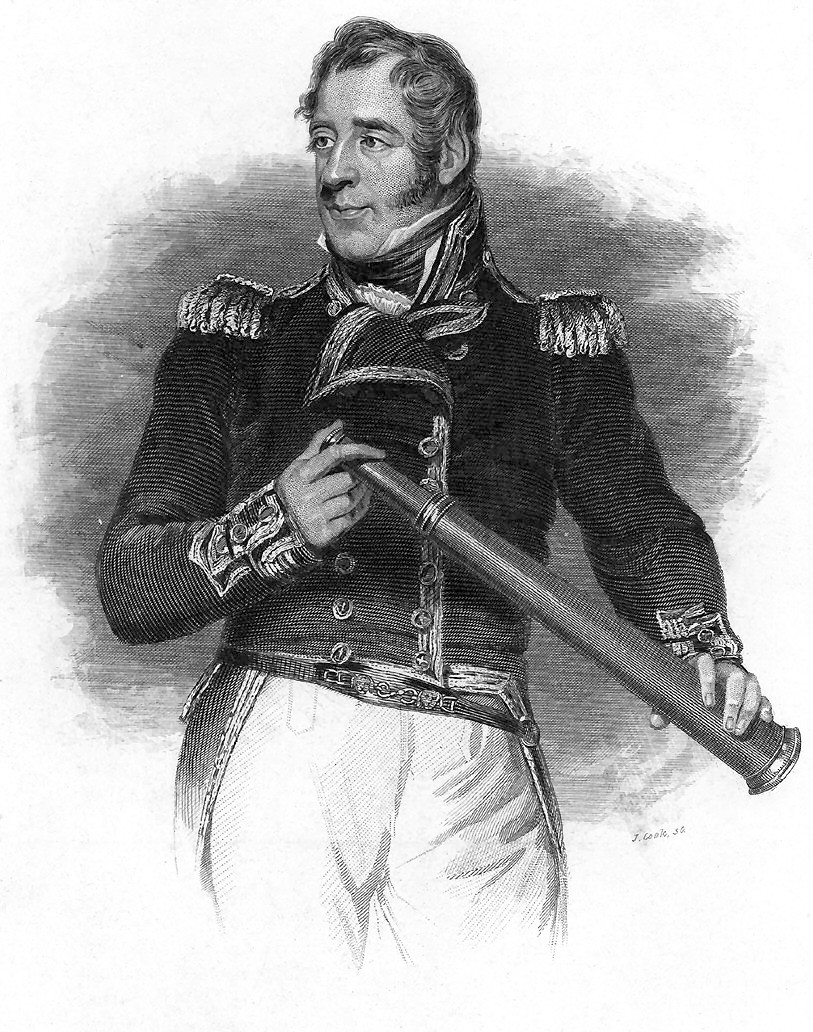
1866 engraving of Lord Dundonald

In June 1806 Lord Cochrane stood for the House of Commons on a ticket of parliamentary reform (a movement which later brought about the Reform Acts) for the potwalloper borough of Honiton in Devon. This was exactly the kind of borough that Cochrane proposed to abolish; votes were mostly sold to the highest bidder. Cochrane offered nothing and lost the election. In October 1806, he ran for Parliament in Honiton and won. Cochrane initially denied that he paid any bribes, but he revealed in a Parliamentary debate ten years later that he had paid ten guineas (£10 10s) per voter through a Mr Townshend, local headman and banker.

In May 1807 Cochrane was elected by Westminster in a more democratic election. He had campaigned for parliamentary reform, allied with such Radicals as William Cobbett, Sir Francis Burdett and Henry Hunt. His outspoken criticism of the conduct of the war and the corruption in the navy made him powerful enemies in the government. His criticism of Admiral Gambier's conduct at the Battle of the Basque Roads was so severe that Gambier demanded a court-martial to clear his name. Cochrane made important enemies in the Admiralty during this period.

In 1810 Burdett, a member of Parliament and political ally, had barricaded himself in his home at Piccadilly, London, resisting arrest by the House of Commons. Cochrane went to assist Burdett's defence of the house. His intended actions, similar to those he had used in the navy, would have led to numerous deaths amongst the arresting officers and at least partial destruction of Burdett's house, along with much of Piccadilly. On realising what Cochrane planned, Burdett and his allies took steps to end the siege.

Cochrane was popular with the public but was unable to get along with his colleagues in the Commons or within the government. He usually had little success in promoting his causes. An exception was his successful confrontation of a prize court in 1814.

His conviction in the Great Stock Exchange Fraud of 1814 resulted in Parliament expelling him on 5 July 1814. However, his constituents in the seat of Westminster re-elected him at the resulting by-election on 16 July. He held this seat until 1818. In 1818 Cochrane's last speech in Parliament advocated parliamentary reform.

In 1830 Cochrane initially expressed interest in standing for Parliament but then declined. Lord Brougham's brother had decided to run for the seat, and Cochrane also thought that it would look bad for him to be publicly supporting a government from which he sought pardon for his fraud conviction.

In 1831 his father died and Cochrane became the 10th Earl of Dundonald. As such, he was no longer entitled to sit in the Commons.

While serving as the Commander-in-Chief of the North America and West Indies Station, Cochrane became acquainted with the geologist and physicist Abraham Gesner in Halifax. The pair planned a commercial venture that would supply Halifax with lamp oil and mine bitumen deposits in Trinidad and Albert Country, New Brunswick. By 1850 Cochrane had purchased all the land surrounding Trinidad's pitch lake in support of the endeavour. The enterprise ultimately did not come into fruition, and Cochrane returned to England after his term of service expired in April 1851.

== Marriage and children ==
In 1812 Cochrane married Katherine ("Katy") Frances Corbet Barnes, an orphan who was about twenty years his junior. They met through Cochrane's cousin Nathaniel Day Cochrane. This was an elopement and a civil ceremony, due to the opposition of his wealthy uncle Basil Cochrane, who disinherited his nephew as a result. Cochrane called Katherine "Kate," "Kitty" or "Mouse" in his letters to her. She often accompanied her husband on his extended campaigns in South America and Greece.

Cochrane and Katherine remarried in the Anglican Church in 1818, and in the Church of Scotland in 1825. They had six children:

- Thomas Barnes Cochrane, 11th Earl of Dundonald, (14 April 1814 – 15 January 1885) m. Louisa Harriett McKinnon
- William Horatio Bernardo Cochrane, officer, 92nd Gordon Highlanders, (8 March 1818 – 6 February 1900) m. Jacobina Frances Nicholson
- Elizabeth Katharine Cochrane, died close to her first birthday
- Katharine Elizabeth Cochrane, d. 25 August 1869, m. John Willis Fleming
- Admiral Sir Arthur Auckland Leopold Pedro Cochrane KCB (Commander of HMS Niger), (24 September 1824 – 20 August 1905)
- Captain Ernest Gray Lambton Cochrane RN (High Sheriff of Donegal) (4 June 1834 – 2 February 1911) m. 1. Adelaide Blackall 2. Elizabeth Frances Maria Katherine Doherty

The remarriage prompted suspicion that Cochrane's first son Thomas was illegitimate. Investigation of this delayed Thomas's accession to the Earldom of Dundonald on his father's death.

In 1823 Lady Cochrane sailed with her children to Valparaíso on Sesostris to join her husband. Sesostris stopped at Rio de Janeiro on 13 June, where she discovered that he was there, having in March taken command of the Brazilian Navy.

Following Cochrane's return from Greece, the couple disagreed about his spending on inventions and her spending on socialising, which led to their separation in 1839. Katherine moved to Boulogne-sur-Mer with a generous allowance, occasionally visiting London but never staying with her husband. She died in Boulogne in 1865, aged 69.

== Great Stock Exchange Fraud ==
In February 1814 rumours began to circulate of Napoleon's death. The claims were seemingly confirmed by a man in a red staff officer's uniform, identified as Colonel de Bourg, aide-de-camp to Lord Cathcart, the British ambassador to Russia. He arrived in Dover from France on 21 February bearing news that Napoleon had been captured and killed by Cossacks. Share prices rose sharply on the Stock Exchange in reaction to the news and the possibility of peace, particularly in volatile partly-paid government securities called Omniums, which increased from 26 1/2 to 32. However, it soon became clear that the news of Napoleon's death was a hoax. The Stock Exchange established a sub-committee to investigate, and they discovered that six men had sold substantial amounts of Omnium stock during the boom in value. The committee assumed that all six were responsible for the hoax and subsequent fraud. Cochrane had disposed of his entire £139,000 holding in Omnium (equivalent to £11.9 million in 2024) – which he had only acquired a month before – and was named as one of the six conspirators, as were his uncle Andrew Cochrane-Johnstone and his stockbroker, Richard Butt. Within days an anonymous informant told the committee that Colonel de Bourg was an imposter: he was a Prussian aristocrat named Charles Random de Berenger. He had also been seen entering Cochrane's house on the day of the hoax.

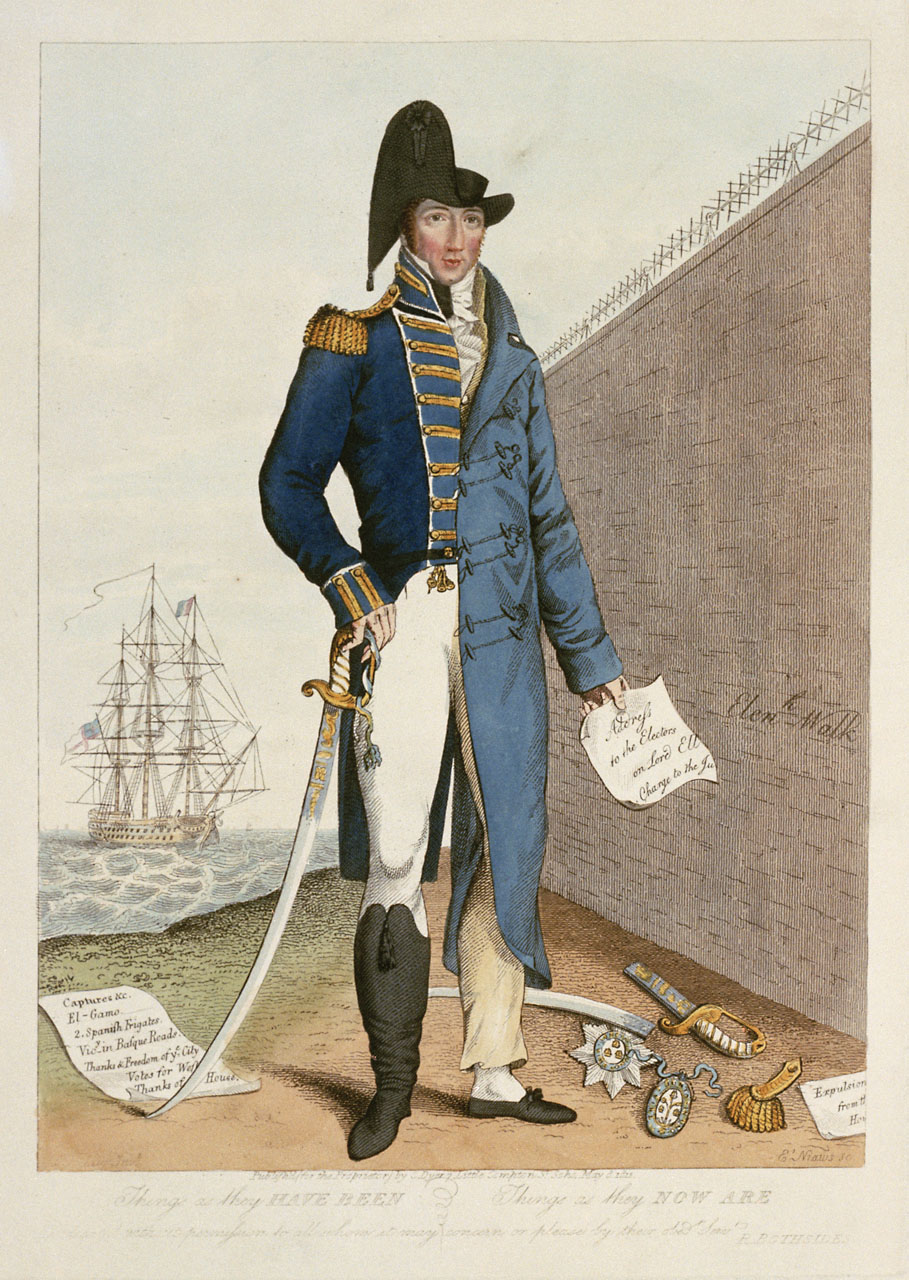
A caricature created in 1815 titled Things as they have been. Things as they now are. The left side of the image depicts Cochrane as a heroic naval officer. The right side depicts him as a disgraced civilian imprisoned within the walls of the King's Bench Prison.

The accused were brought to trial in the Court of King's Bench, Guildhall on 8 June 1814. The trial was presided over by Lord Ellenborough, a High Tory and a notable enemy of the radicals, who had previously convicted and sentenced to prison the radical politicians William Cobbett and Henry Hunt in politically motivated trials. The evidence against Cochrane was circumstantial and hinged on the nature of his share dealings, his contacts with the conspirators, and the colour of uniform which De Berenger had been wearing when they met in his house. Cochrane admitted that he was acquainted with De Berenger and that the man had visited his home on the day of the fraud, but insisted that he had arrived wearing a green sharpshooter's uniform rather than the red uniform worn by the person who claimed to be de Bourg. Cochrane said that De Berenger had visited to request passage to the United States aboard Cochrane's new command HMS Tonnant. Cochrane's servants agreed, in an affidavit created before the trial, that the collar of the uniform above De Berenger's greatcoat had been green. However, they admitted to Cochrane's solicitors that they thought the rest had been red. They were not called at trial to give evidence. The prosecution summoned as key witness hackney carriage driver William Crane, who swore that De Berenger was wearing a scarlet uniform when he delivered him to the house. Cochrane's defence also argued that he had given standing instructions to Butt that his Omnium shares were to be sold if the price rose by 1 per cent, and he would have made double profit if he waited until it reached its peak price.

On the second day of the trial, Lord Ellenborough began his summary of the evidence and drew attention to the matter of De Berenger's uniform; he concluded that witnesses had provided damning evidence. The jury retired to deliberate and returned a verdict of guilty against all the defendants two-and-a-half hours later. Belatedly, Cochrane's defence team found several witnesses who were willing to testify that De Berenger had arrived wearing a green uniform, but Lord Ellenborough dismissed their evidence as inadmissible because two of the conspirators had fled the country upon hearing the guilty verdict. On 20 June 1814 Cochrane was sentenced to 12 months' imprisonment, fined £1,000 and ordered to stand in the pillory opposite the Royal Exchange for one hour. In subsequent weeks he was dismissed from the Royal Navy by the Admiralty and expelled from Parliament following a motion in the House of Commons which was passed by 144 votes to 44. On the orders of the Prince Regent, Cochrane was humiliated by the loss of his appointment Knight of the Order of the Bath in a degradation ceremony at Westminster Abbey. His banner was taken down and physically kicked out of the chapel and down the outside steps. But, within a month, Cochrane was re-elected unopposed as the member of Parliament for Westminster. Following a public outcry, his sentence to the pillory was rescinded for fears that it would lead to the outbreak of a riot.

The question of Cochrane's innocence or guilt created much debate at the time, and it has divided historians ever since. Subsequent reviews of the trial carried out by three Lord Chancellors during the course of the 19th century concluded that he ought to have been found not guilty on the basis of the evidence produced in court. Cochrane maintained his innocence for the rest of his life, and campaigned tirelessly to restore his damaged reputation and to clear his name. He believed that the trial was politically motivated and that a "higher authority than the Stock Exchange" was responsible for his prosecution. A series of petitions put forward by Cochrane protesting his innocence were ignored until 1830. That year King George IV (the former Prince Regent) died and was succeeded by William IV. He had served in the Royal Navy and was sympathetic to Cochrane's cause. Later that year, the Tory government fell and was replaced by a Whig government in which his friend Lord Brougham was appointed Lord Chancellor. Following a meeting of the Privy Council in May 1832, Cochrane was granted a pardon and restored to the Navy List with a promotion to rear-admiral. Support from friends in the government and the writings of popular naval authors such as Frederick Marryat and Maria Graham increased public sympathy for Cochrane's situation. Cochrane's knighthood was restored in May 1847 with the personal intervention of Queen Victoria, and he was appointed Knight Grand Cross of the Order of the Bath. Only in 1860 was his banner returned to Westminster Abbey; it was the day before his funeral.

In 1876 his grandson received a payment of £40,000 from the British government (equivalent to £4.9 million in 2024), based on the recommendations of a Parliamentary select committee, in compensation for Cochrane's conviction. The committee had concluded that his conviction was unjust.

== Service with other navies ==
=== Chilean Navy ===
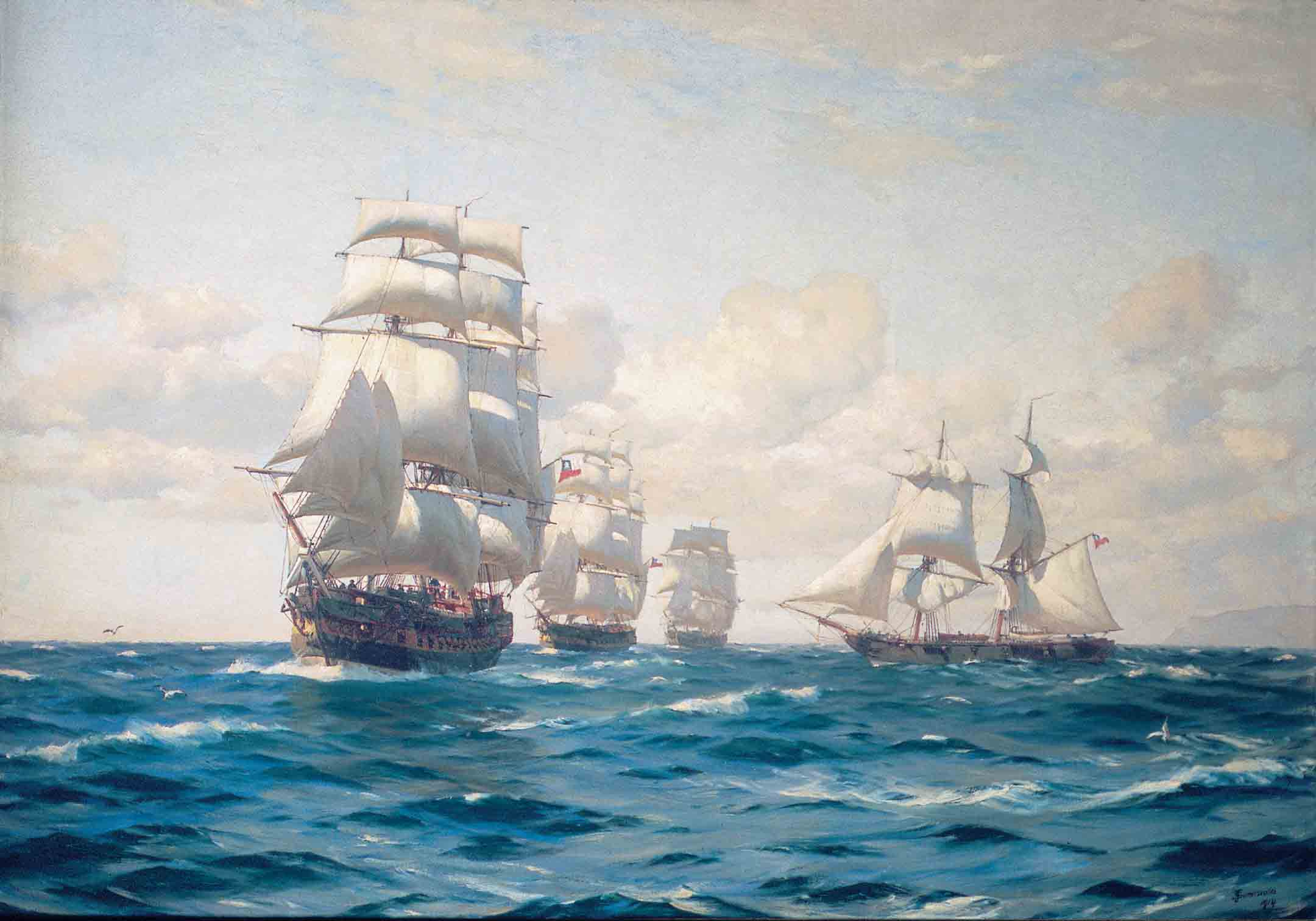
Painting of the First Chilean Navy Squadron commanded by Cochrane

Lord Cochrane left Britain in official disgrace, but that did not end his naval career. In 1817 he placed a notice in one of the leading London newspapers that he was available to go and serve the newly becoming independent nations in America or others. But in London, in 1818, he was met by the representative sent by General José de San Martín, José Antonio Álvarez Condarco, who convinced him in May to join the cause for the Hispano-American independence and go to Chile together alongside a number of British officers who also wanted to be hired. Accompanied by Lady Cochrane and their two children, he reached Valparaíso on 28 November 1818. Chile was rapidly organising its new navy for its war of independence.

Cochrane became a Chilean citizen on 11 December 1818 at the request of Chilean leader Bernardo O'Higgins. He was appointed Vice Admiral and took command of the Chilean Navy in Chile's war of independence against Spain. He was the first Vice Admiral of Chile. Cochrane reorganised the Chilean navy with British commanders, introducing British naval customs and, formally, English-speaking governance in their warships. He took command in the frigate O'Higgins and blockaded and raided the coasts of Peru, as he had those of France and Spain. On his own initiative, he organised and led the capture of Valdivia, despite only having 300 men and two ships to deploy against seven large forts. He failed in his attempt to capture the Chiloé Archipelago for Chile.

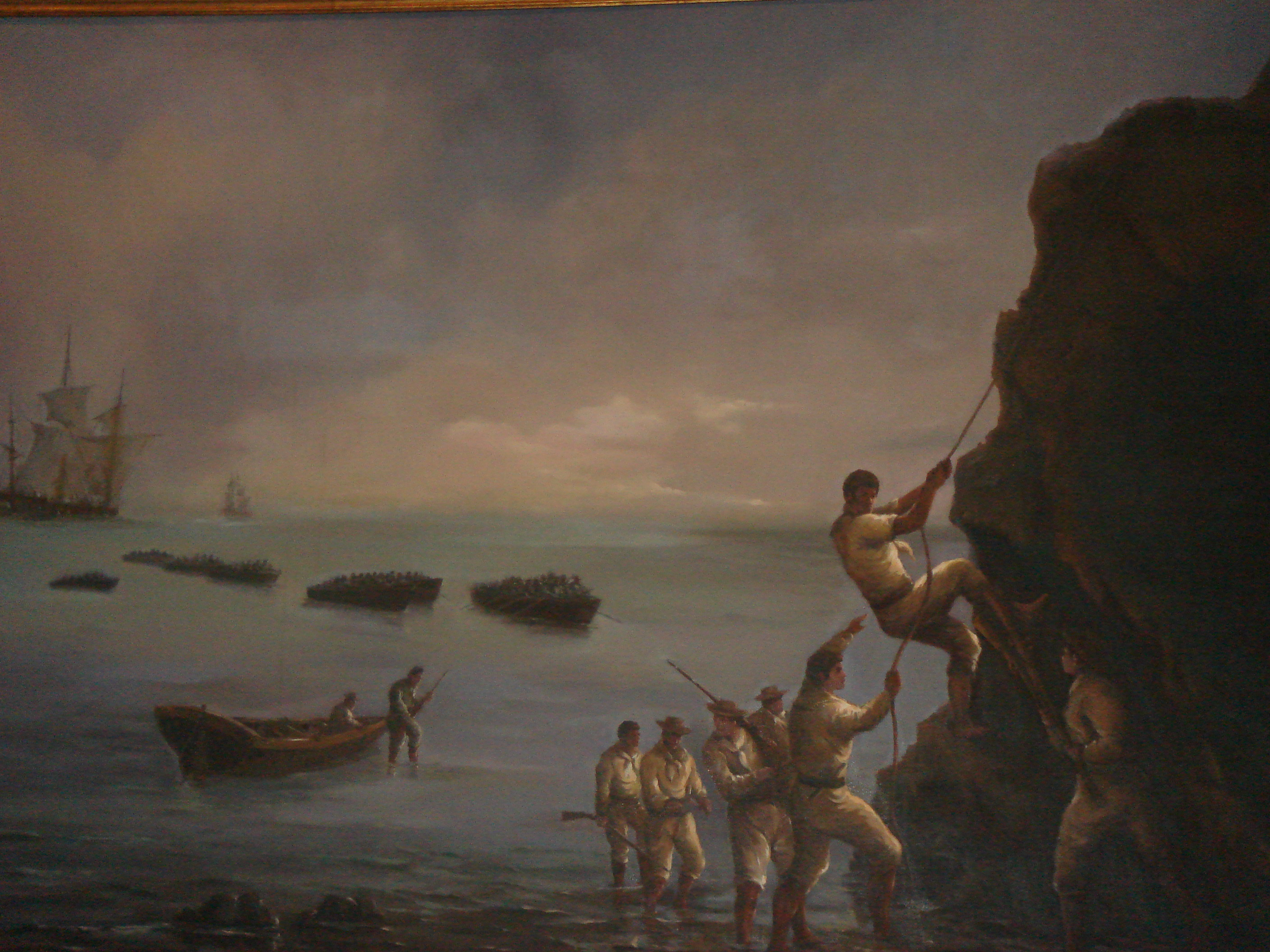
A painting of the Capture of Valdivia in the Chilean naval and maritime museum

In 1820 O'Higgins ordered him to convoy the Liberating Expedition of Peru under General José de San Martín to Peru, blockade the coast, and support the campaign for independence. Later, forces under Cochrane's personal command cut out and captured the frigate Esmeralda, the most powerful Spanish ship in South America. All of this led to Peruvian independence, which O'Higgins considered indispensable to Chile's security. Cochrane's victories in the Pacific were spectacular and important. The excitement was almost immediately marred by his accusations that he had been plotted against by subordinates and treated with contempt and denied adequate financial reward by his superiors. The evidence does not support these accusations, and the problem appeared to lie in Cochrane's own suspicious and uneasy personality. Cochrane had an uneasy relation with San Martín who was serene and calculating in contrast with Cochrane's tendency for audacious actions. San Martín criticised Cochrane's interest for financial gain giving him the nickname El Metálico Lord (The Metallic Lord). (Note: Nickname registered by Dr. Paroissien, whose spirit roughly translates as 'the count of cash' or 'the baron of bullion'.)

Loose words from his wife Katy resulted in a rumour that Cochrane had made plans to free Napoleon from his exile on Saint Helena and make him ruler of a unified South American state. This could not have been true because Charles, the supposed envoy bearing the rumoured plans, had been killed two months before his reported "departure to Europe". Cochrane left the service of the Chilean Navy on 29 November 1822.

==== Chilean naval vessels named after Lord Cochrane ====
The Chilean Navy has named five ships Cochrane or Almirante Cochrane (Admiral Cochrane) in his honour:

- The first, Almirante Cochrane, was a battery ship that fought in the War of the Pacific (1879–1884).
- The second Almirante Cochrane was a dreadnought battleship laid down in Britain in 1913. The Royal Navy acquired the unfinished ship in 1917, converting her into the aircraft carrier HMS Eagle.
- The third ship, Cochrane, was a Fletcher-class destroyer, the former USS Rooks, commissioned into the Chilean Navy in 1962 and scrapped in 1983.
- The fourth ship, Almirante Cochrane, was a County-class destroyer, the former HMS Antrim, which the Chilean Navy acquired in 1984 and decommissioned in 2006.
- The fifth and current ship to bear the name, Almirante Cochrane (FF-05), is a Type 23 frigate, the former HMS Norfolk, which the Chilean Navy commissioned in 2006.

=== Imperial Brazilian Navy ===
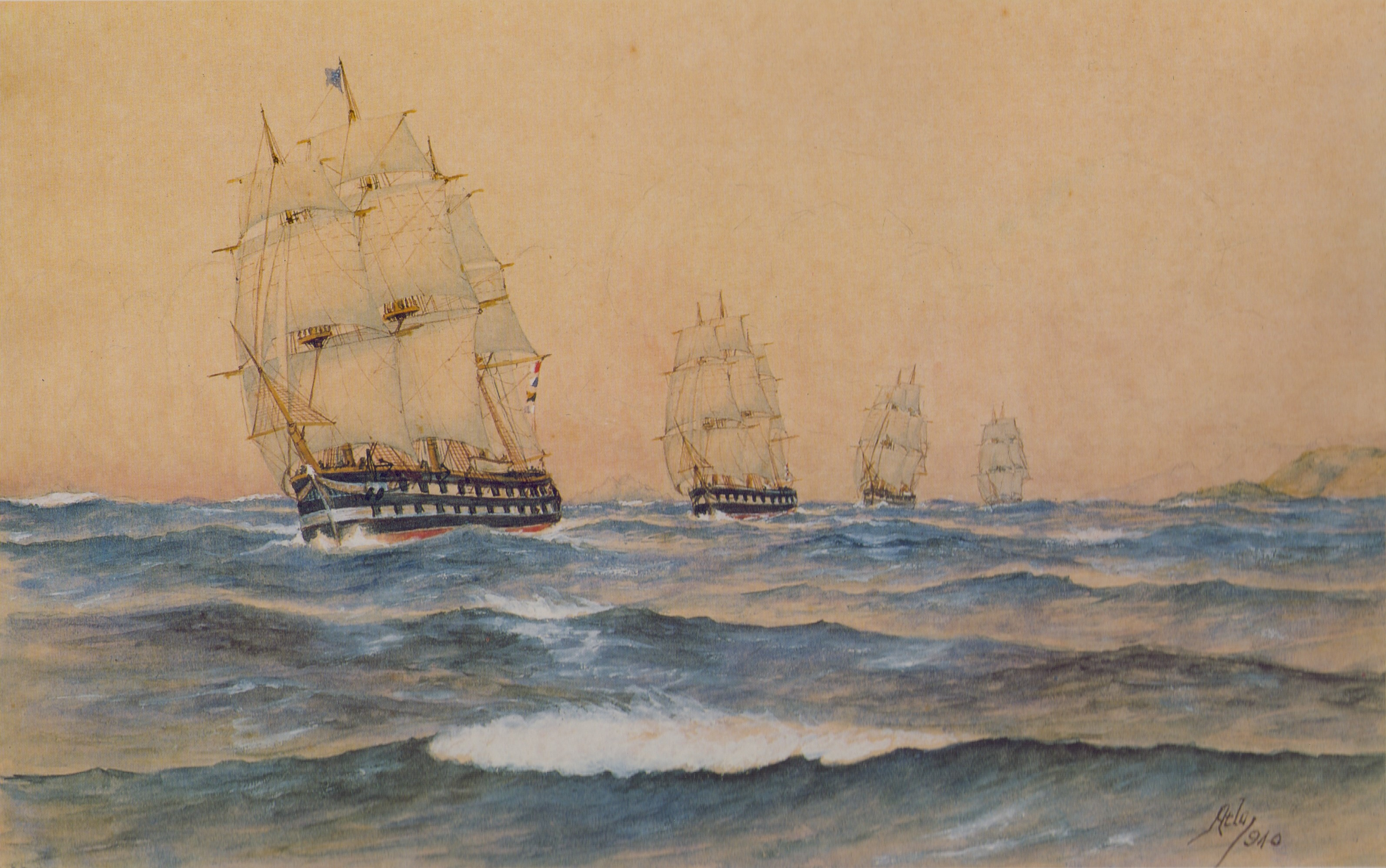
First Brazilian Squadron, 1822, by Trajano Augusto de Carvalho, 1938

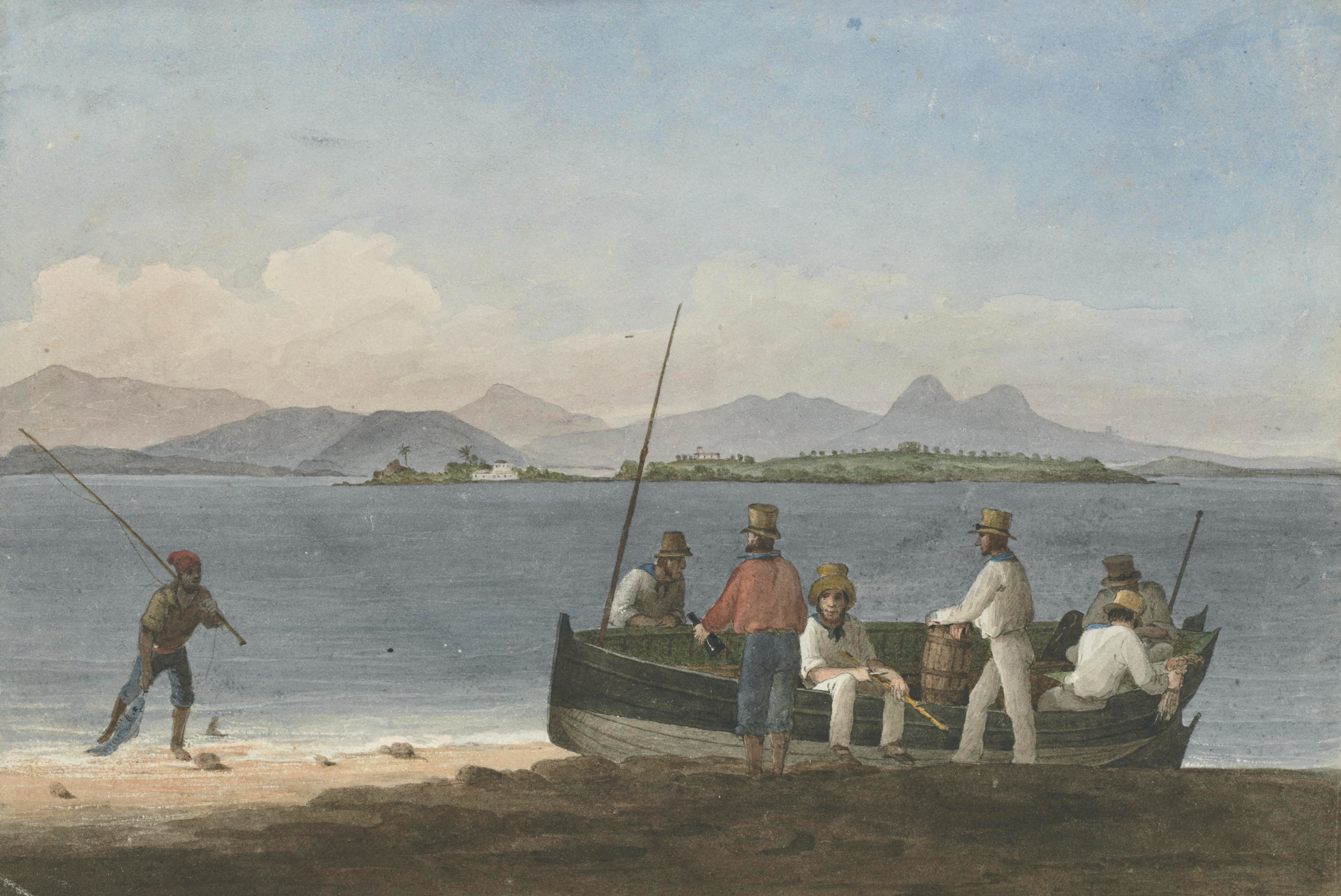
View of the Bay of Rio de Janeiro, Lord Cochrane's boat & crew, watercolour by Augustus Earle, c. 1822

Brazil was fighting its own war of independence against Portugal. In 1822, the southern provinces (except Montevideo, now in Uruguay) came under the control of the patriots led by the Prince Regent, later Emperor Pedro I. Portugal still controlled some important provincial capitals in the north, with major garrisons and naval bases such as Belém, Salvador, and São Luís.

Lord Cochrane took command of the Imperial Brazilian Navy on 21 March 1823 and was appointed "First Admiral of the National and Imperial Navy" at the flagship Pedro I. He blockaded the Portuguese in Bahia, confronted them at the Battle of 4 May, and forced them to evacuate the province in a vast convoy of ships which Cochrane's men attacked as they crossed the Atlantic. Cochrane sailed to Maranhão (then spelled Maranham) on his own initiative and bluffed the garrison into surrender by claiming that a vast (and mythical) Brazilian fleet and army were over the horizon. He sent subordinate Captain John Pascoe Grenfell to Belém to use the same bluff and extract a Portuguese surrender. As a result of Cochrane's efforts, Brazil became totally de facto independent and free of any Portuguese troops. On Cochrane's return to Rio de Janeiro in 1824, Emperor Pedro I rewarded the officer by granting him the non-hereditary title of Marquess of Maranhão (Marquês do Maranhão) in the Empire of Brazil. He was also awarded an accompanying coat of arms.

As in Chile and earlier occasions, Cochrane's joy at these successes was rapidly replaced by quarrels over pay and prize money, and an accusation that the Brazilian authorities were plotting against him.

In mid-1824 Cochrane sailed north with a squadron to assist the Brazilian army under General Francisco Lima e Silva in suppressing a republican rebellion in the state of Pernambuco which had begun to spread to Maranhão and other northern states. The rebellion was rapidly extinguished. Cochrane proceeded to Maranhão, where he took over the administration. He demanded the payment of prize money which he claimed he was owed as a result of the recapture of the province in 1823. He absconded with public money and sacked merchant ships anchored in São Luís do Maranhão. Defying orders to return to Rio de Janeiro, Cochrane transferred to a captured Brazilian frigate, left Brazil and returned to Britain where he arrived in late June 1825.

=== Greek Navy ===
In August 1825 Cochrane was hired by Greece to support its fight for independence from the Ottoman Empire, which had deployed an army raised in Egypt to suppress the Greek rebellion. He took an active role in the campaign between March 1827 and December 1828, but met with limited success. His subordinate Captain Hastings attacked Ottoman forces at the Gulf of Lepanto, which indirectly led to intervention by Britain, France and Russia. They succeeded in destroying the Turko–Egyptian fleet at the Battle of Navarino, and the war was ended under mediation of the Great Powers. He resigned his commission toward the end of the war and returned to Britain.

== Return to Royal Navy ==
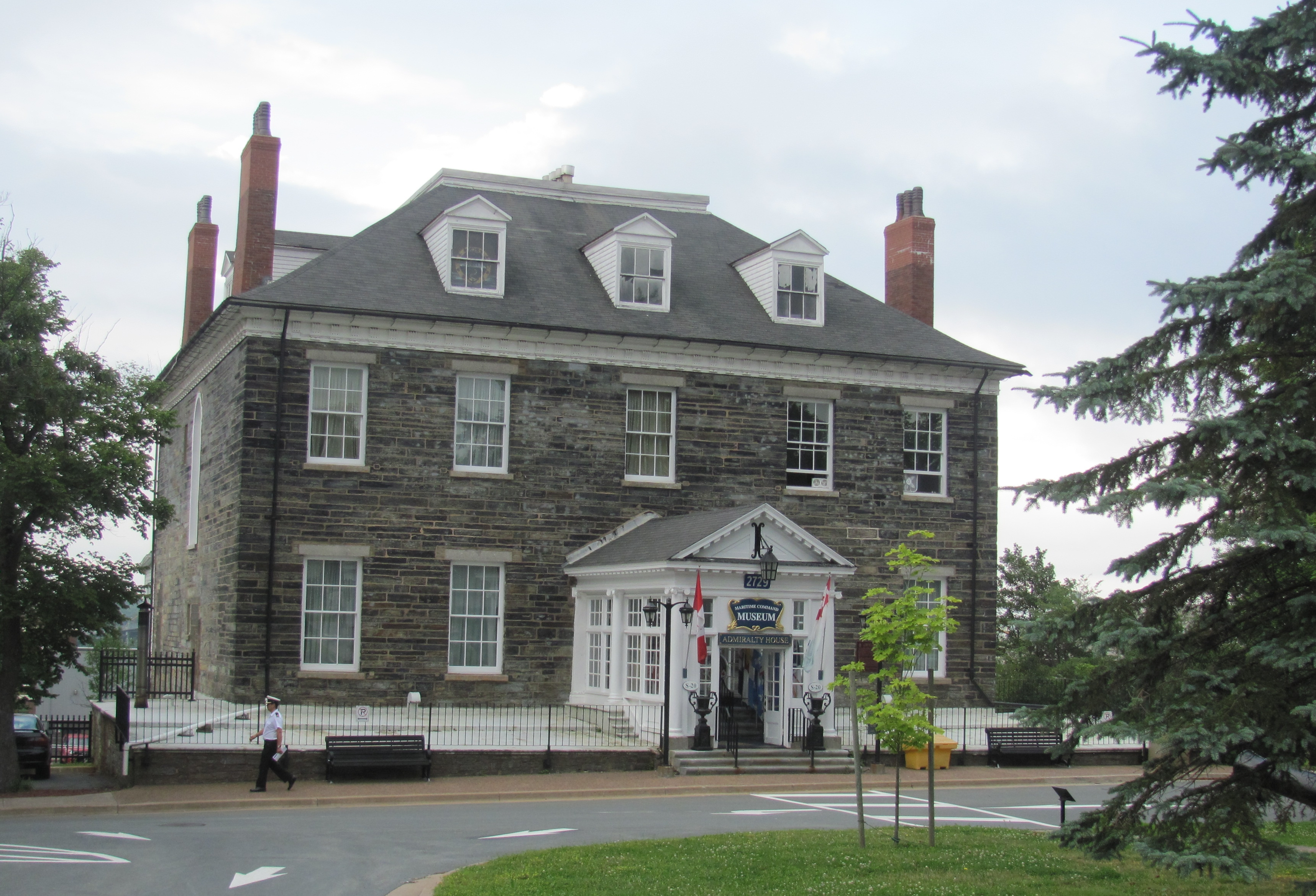
Lord Dundonald's residence in Halifax, Nova Scotia, while Commander-in-Chief, North America Station (1848–1851)

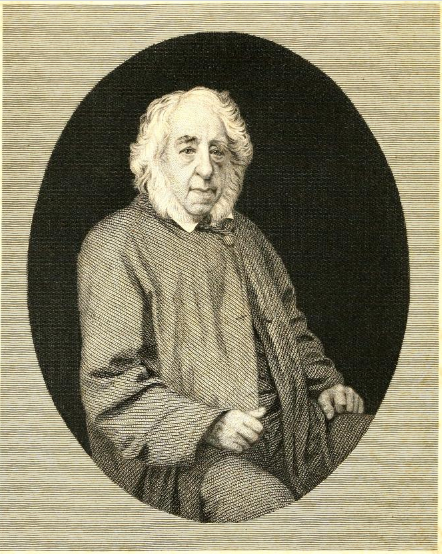
Lord Dundonald in old age; an engraving by Joseph Brown (1809–1887), published with his autobiography.

Lord Cochrane inherited his peerage following his father's death on 1 July 1831, becoming The 10th Earl of Dundonald. He was restored to the Royal Navy list on 2 May 1832 as a Rear-Admiral of the Blue. The full return of Lord Dundonald, as he was now known, to Royal Navy service was delayed by his refusal to take a command until his knighthood had been restored, which took 15 years. He continued to receive promotions in the list of flag officers, as follows:

- Rear-Admiral of the Blue on 2 May 1832
- Rear-Admiral of the White on 10 January 1837
- Rear-Admiral of the Red on 28 June 1838
- Vice-Admiral of the Blue on 23 November 1841
- Vice-Admiral of the White on 9 November 1846
- Vice-Admiral of the Red on 3 January 1848
- Admiral of the Blue on 21 March 1851
- Admiral of the White on 2 April 1853
- Admiral of the Red on 8 December 1857

On 22 May 1847 Queen Victoria reappointed him Knight of the Order of the Bath. He returned to the Royal Navy, serving as Commander-in-Chief of the North America and West Indies Station from 1848 to 1851. During the Crimean War the government considered him for a command in the Baltic, but decided that there was too high a chance that Lord Dundonald would risk the fleet in a daring attack. On 6 November 1854 he was appointed to the honorary office of Rear-Admiral of the United Kingdom, an office that he retained until his death.

In his final years Lord Dundonald wrote his autobiography in collaboration with G.B. Earp. He twice had to undergo painful surgery for kidney stones in 1860 with his health deteriorating. He died during the second operation on 31 October 1860 in Kensington.

Dundonald was buried in Westminster Abbey; his grave is in the central part of the nave. Each year in May, representatives of the Chilean Navy hold a wreath-laying ceremony at his grave.

== Innovations in technology ==
Convoys were guided by ships following the lamps of those ahead. In 1805 Cochrane entered a Royal Navy competition for a superior convoy lamp. He believed the judges were biased against him, so he re-entered the contest under another name and won the prize.

In 1806 Cochrane had a galley made to his specifications which he carried on board Pallas and used to attack the French coast. It had the advantage of mobility and flexibility.

In 1812 Cochrane proposed attacking the French coast using a combination of bombardment ships, explosion ships, and "stink vessels" (gas warfare). A bombardment ship consisted of a strengthened old hulk filled with powder and shot and made to list to one side. It was anchored at night to face the enemy behind the harbour wall. When set off, it provided saturation bombardment of the harbour, which would be closely followed by landings of troops. He put the plans forward again before and during the Crimean War. The authorities, however, decided not to pursue his plans.

In 1818 he patented the tunnelling shield together with engineer Marc Isambard Brunel, which Brunel and his son used in building the Thames Tunnel in 1825–43. Cochrane also patented the first airlock in 1830, and in 1879 his airlock setup was used to assist with tunnelling under the Hudson River in New York.

During 1851–1853, he filed in England a series of comprehensive patents covering the applications of natural asphalt. These patents were confined chiefly to the use of asphalt as a paving material, as a mastic, as a "hydraulic concrete" suitable for fashioning into water pipes and sewer mains and as an insulating material for electric wires.

Cochrane was an early supporter of steamships. He tried to take the steamship Rising Star from Britain to Chile for use in the war of independence in the 1820s, but its construction took too long; it did not arrive until the war was ending. Rising Star was a 410-ton vessel adapted to a new design at Brent's Yard at the Greenland Dock at the Thames: twin funnels, a retractable paddle wheel, and driven by a 60-horsepower engine. Similarly, he suffered delays with construction of a steamship which he had hoped to put into use in the Greek War of Independence. In the 1830s Lord Dundonald, as he now was, experimented with steam power, developing a rotary engine and a propeller. In 1851 he received a patent on powering steamships with bitumen. He was conferred with Honorary Membership in the Institution of Engineers and Shipbuilders in Scotland in 1857.

== Burial and memorial ==
Lord Dundonald was interred in Westminster Abbey in the floor of the nave directly before the choir. The procession was led by dean Bradley (robed as Chancellor of the Order of Bath). Persons involved were: The Brazilian Minister in London and his entire staff (in full levée dress), 12th Earl of Dundonald (wearing a general's uniform), Captain Duarte de Bacella (of the Floriano), First Lieutenant Arthur Thompson, Lieutenant Eduardo de Procuca, and Lieutenant Oscar Gomes Bruza (of the same vessel). The captain and his chief lieutenant carried extra wreaths as personal offerings from the Brazilian warship's company and from her officers.

The Brazilian Minister uttered these words; "We place these flowers on Lord Cochrane's grave in the name of the Brazilian Navy, which he created, and of the Brazilian nation, to whose independence and unity he rendered incomparable services." Cochrane's grandson, Douglas Cochrane, 12th Earl of Dundonald, replied to the minister by saying: "Senhor Nabuco, on behalf of my grandfather's family, I thank the Brazilian Navy and the Brazilian people for this tribute of respect to his memory."

His epitaph, written by Sir Lyon Playfair, reads:

'Here rests in his 85th year Thomas Cochrane Tenth Earl of Dundonald of Paisley and of Ochiltree in the Peerage of Scotland Marquess of Marenham in the Empire of Brazil GCB and Admiral of the Fleet who by his confidence and genius his science and extraordinary daring inspired by his heroic exertion in the cause of freedom and his splended services alike to his own country, Greece, Brazil, Chile and Peru achieved a name illustrious throughout the world for courage, patriotism and chivalry. Born Dec 14 1775. Died Oct 31 1860'

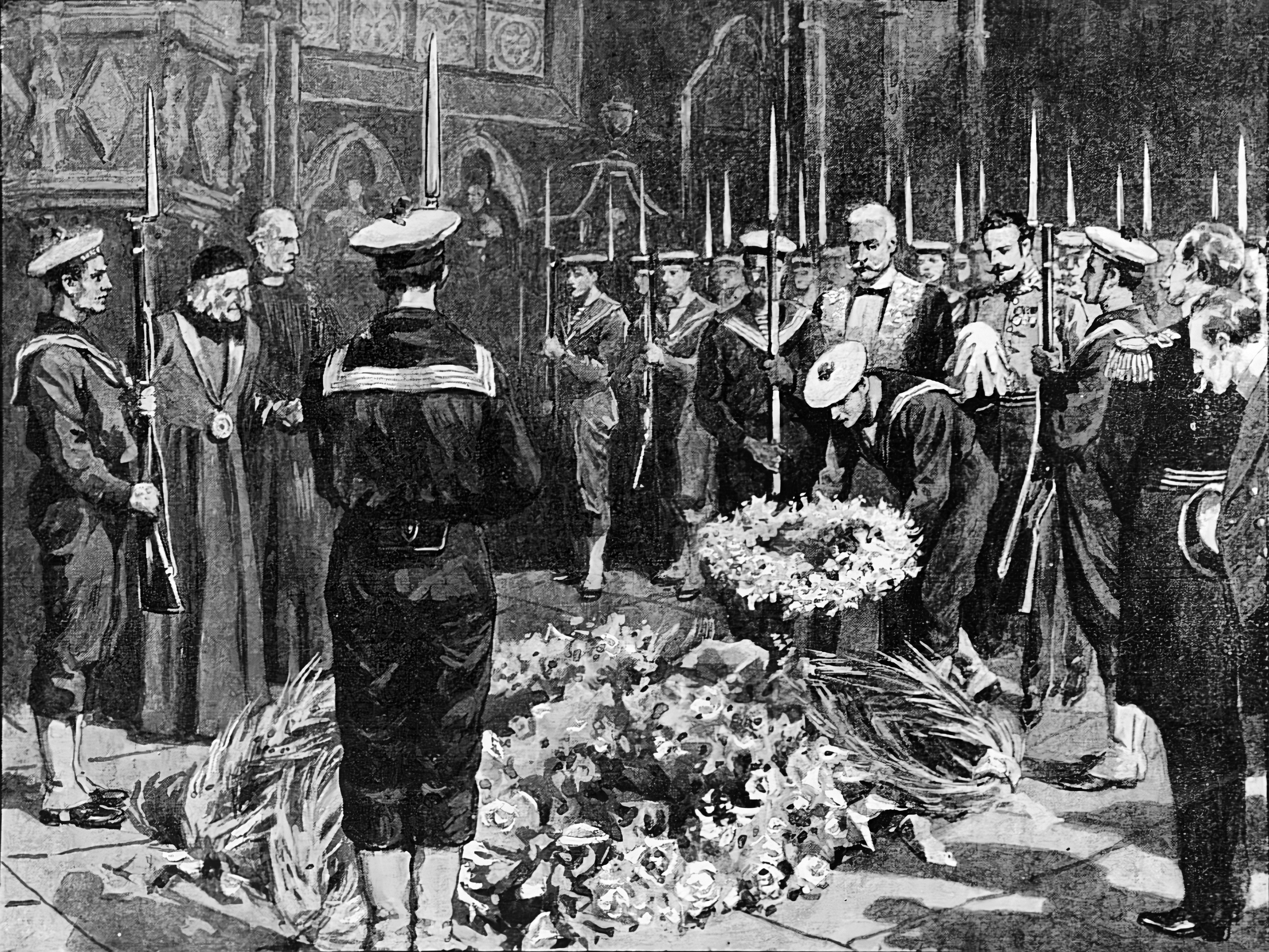
Tribute of respect to the memory of Admiral Lord Cochrane by Brazilian naval officers (1901). His grandson, Douglas Cochrane, 12th Earl of Dundonald is pictured 4th from the right.

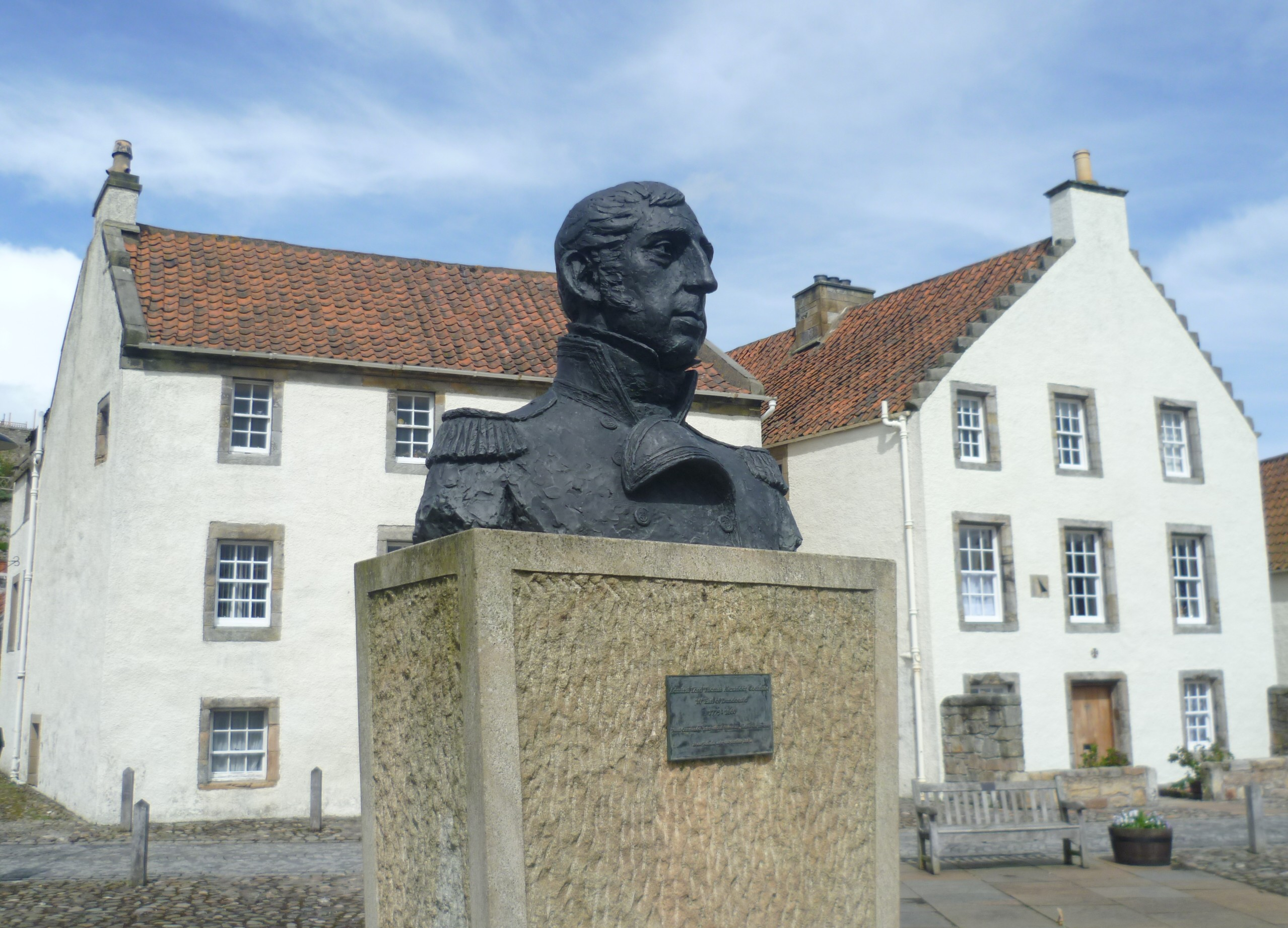
Bust of Admiral Lord Dundonald (previously known as Lord Cochrane), in Culross, by Scott Sutherland; originally commissioned for HMS Cochrane shore base.

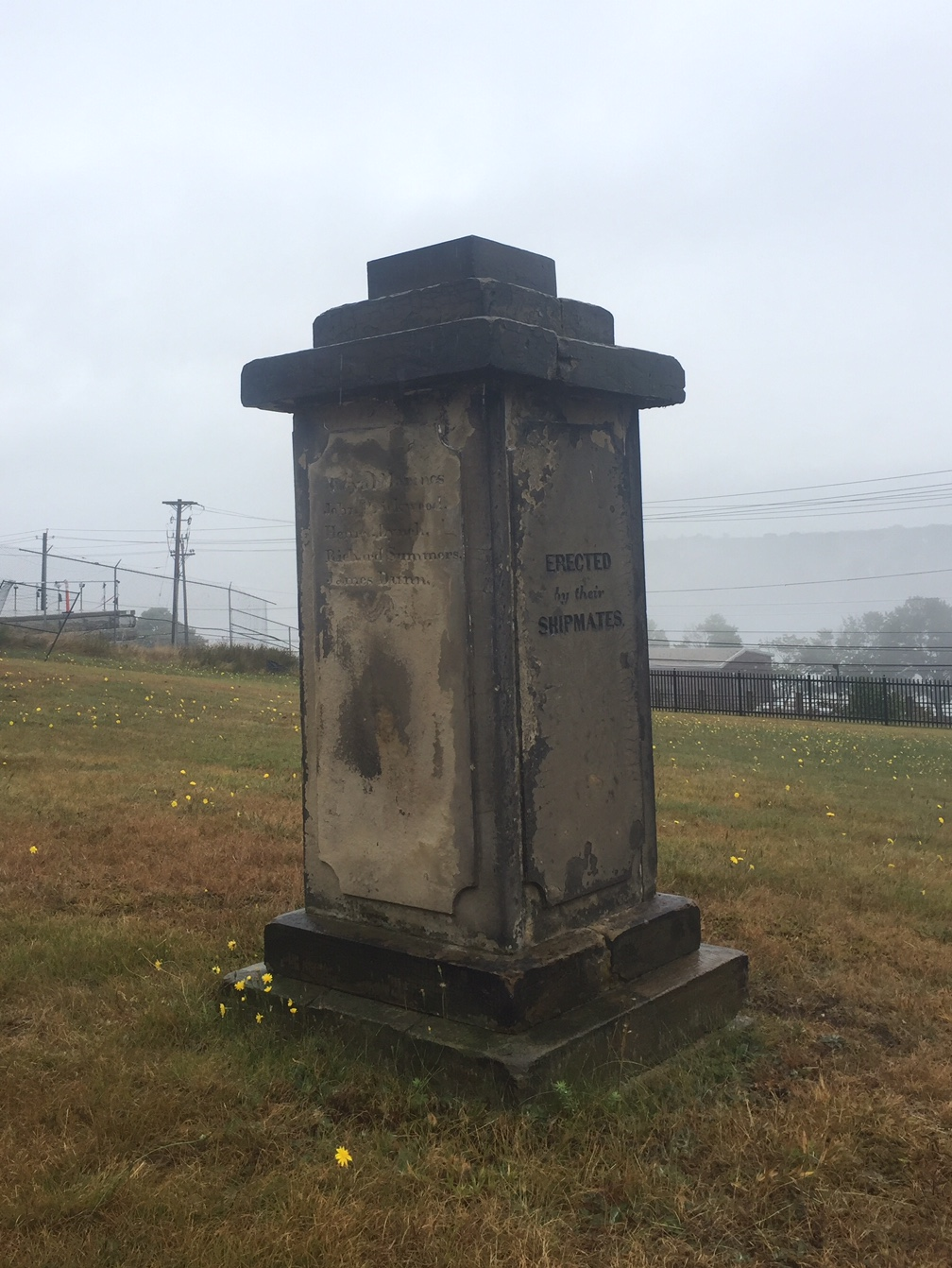
Lord Dundonald's marker to commemorate the 11 who died on his flagship, HMS Wellesley; Royal Navy Burying Ground (Halifax, Nova Scotia), (1850)

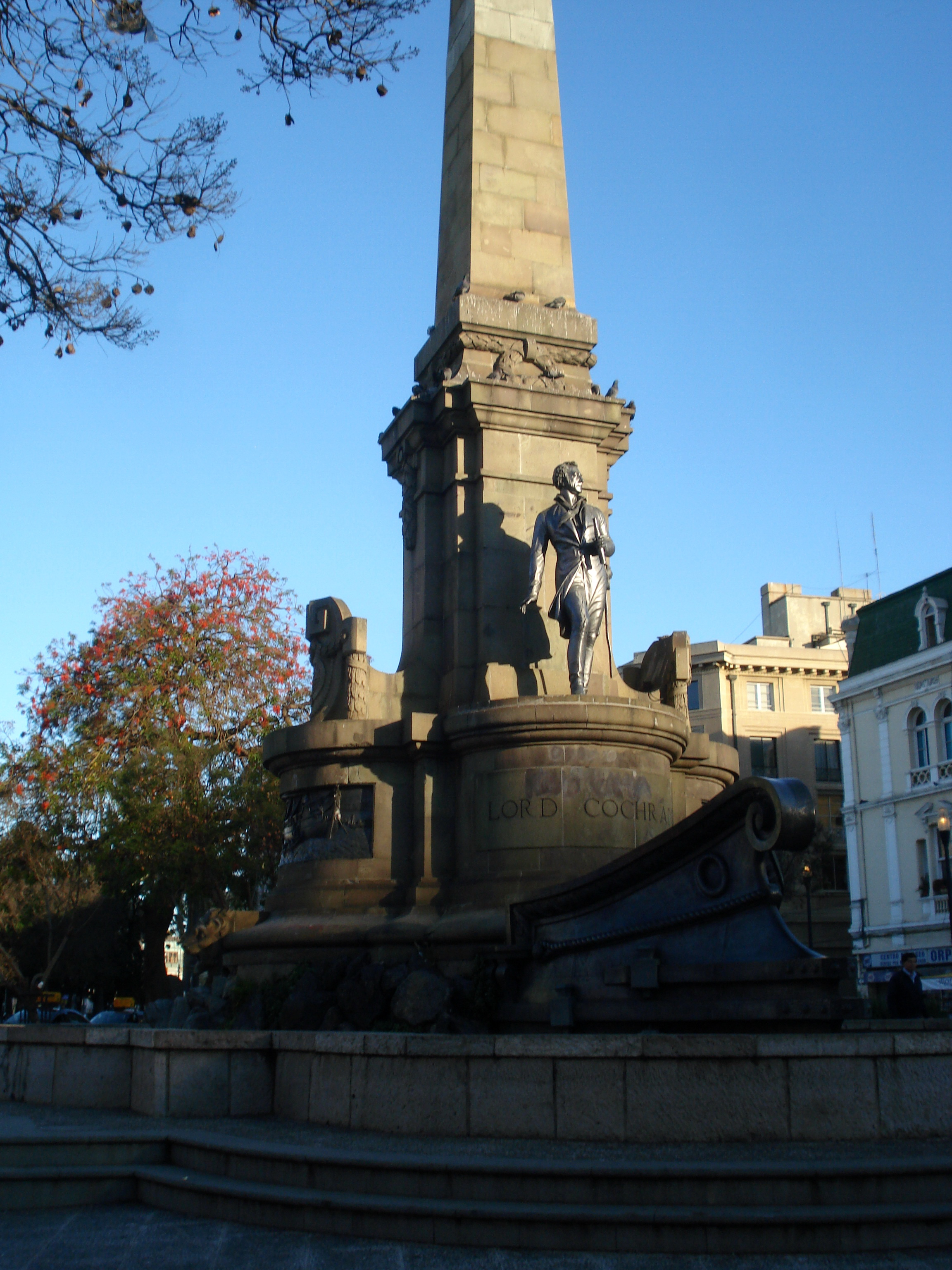
Memorial to Lord Dundonald in Valparaíso, Chile.

=== Ancestry ===
Ancestors of Thomas Cochrane, 10th Earl of Dundonald

8. William Cochrane of Ochiltree
4. Thomas Cochrane, 8th Earl of Dundonald
9. Mary Bruce
2. Archibald Cochrane, 9th Earl of Dundonald
10. Archibald Stuart, 5th of Torrance
5. Jane Stuart
11. Elizabeth Myrton
1. Thomas Cochrane, 10th Earl of Dundonald
12. Walter Gilchrist
6. Captain James Gilchrist of Annesfield
13. Grizel Hamilton of Neilsland
3. Anne Gilchrist
14. Major John Roberton, 16th Laird of Earnock
7. Ann Roberton
15. Elizabeth Hamilton

== Arms ==
Arms of Cochrane of Dundonald

Earl of Dundonald's Coat of arms.

Coat of arms of the Marquess of Maranhão.

== Literary references ==
=== Influence on naval fiction ===
His career inspired a number of writers of nautical fiction. The first was Captain Frederick Marryat, who had served under him as a midshipman and published his first novel in 1829. In the 20th century, the figures and careers of Horatio Hornblower in the novels by C. S. Forester and of Jack Aubrey in the Aubrey–Maturin series of novels by Patrick O'Brian were in part modelled on his exploits.

=== Appearance in fiction ===
- Lord Cochrane was first featured as a character in a novel in Arthur Conan Doyle's Rodney Stone (1896).
- He also appeared in G. A. Henty's With Cochrane the Dauntless (1897).
- The novel The Sea Lord (originally The Frigate Captain) by Showell Styles is about Lord Cochrane.
- Cochrane is one of the main characters in the novel Sharpe's Devil by Bernard Cornwell, taking place in 1821 and portraying Cochrane's attack on the Chilean port of Valdivia.
- Lord Cochrane is a minor character in Manuela by Gregory Kauffman, a novel about the South American revolutions.
- The novel Flashman and the Seawolf, by Robert Brightwell, is based on Cochrane's early career aboard Speedy. His South American adventures, particularly his command of the Brazilian Navy, are covered in a later book by the same author, Flashman and the Emperor.
- In the alternate history series The Domination by S.M. Stirling, Lord Cochrane is featured leading the occupation of Cape Colony in South Africa.
- Lord Cochrane is a character in the novel The True Confessions of a London Spy by Katherine Cowley.
- In the part of The Motorcycle Diaries describing the visit of the young Che Guevara to the port of Lima in Peru, Guevara refers to Lord Cochrane and his part in the Liberating Expedition of Peru.
- Lord Cochrane and his wife both feature as characters in Sara Sheridan's Wilbur Smith Prize shortlisted novel On Starlit Seas (2025) in which Cochrane's family friend Maria Graham travels from Brazil to London becoming enmeshed in a smuggling ring.

=== Poetry ===
- Cochrane inspired Lord Cochrane de Chile, a 1967 collection of poems by Pablo Neruda which was set to music by the Chilean composer Gustavo Becerra-Schmidt.
- "Lord Cochranes maskine" (Lord Cochrane's Machine) is mentioned in the rather gruesome Danish children's song "En svensk konstabel fra Sverrig" ("A Swedish Constable from Sweden") as a monstrous and unspecified war machine. In fact it is a Swedish soldier that has blown himself up with a cannon.

== See also ==
- John Dundas Cochrane, his cousin.
- Admiral Sir Alexander Forrester Inglis Cochrane, his uncle.
- Sir Thomas John Cochrane, Vice-Admiral of the United Kingdom and Governor of Newfoundland, his cousin.
- O'Byrne, William Richard (1849). "Dundonald, Thomas" . A Naval Biographical Dictionary . John Murray – via Wikisource.

== Citations ==
Parliament of the United Kingdom
Preceded by Richard Bateman-Robson; Augustus Cavendish Bradshaw	Member of Parliament for Honiton; 1806 – 1807; With: Augustus Cavendish Bradshaw	Succeeded by Sir Charles Hamilton, Bt; Augustus Cavendish Bradshaw
Preceded by Richard Brinsley Sheridan; Sir Samuel Hood, Bt	Member of Parliament for Westminster; 1807 – 1818; With: Sir Francis Burdett, Bt	Succeeded by Sir Francis Burdett, Bt; Sir Samuel Romilly
Military offices
Preceded by Sir Francis Austen	Commander-in-Chief, North America and West Indies Station; 1848–1851	Succeeded by Sir George Seymour
Honorary titles
Preceded by Sir William Hall Gage	Rear-Admiral of the United Kingdom; 1854–1860	Succeeded by Sir Graham Eden Hamond, Bt
Peerage of Scotland
Preceded by Archibald Cochrane	Earl of Dundonald; 1831–1860	Succeeded by Thomas Barnes Cochrane
