= Thomas Cochrane, 8th Earl of Dundonald =

British Army officer and politician

Major The Right Honourable The Earl of Dundonald
- Born: 1691
- Died: 31 October 1778 (aged 86–87)
- Relatives: Archibald Cochrane (son); John Cochrane (son); Basil Cochrane (son); Alexander Cochrane (son); George Cochrane (son); Andrew Cochrane (son); Thomas Cochrane (grandson); John Dundas Cochrane (grandson)
- Military career
- Allegiance: Great Britain
- Branch: British Army
- Rank: Major
- Units: Royal Regiment of Dragoons; 27th Regiment of Foot

Major Thomas Cochrane, 8th Earl of Dundonald (1691 – 31 October 1778) was a British Army officer and politician. He was Member of Parliament for Renfrewshire, 1722–1727. He served as Commissioner of the Excise for Scotland from 1730 until 1764. He acceded to the title of Earl of Dundonald in 1758 on the death of his cousin, William Cochrane, 7th Earl of Dundonald.

== Early life and education ==
Thomas was born in 1691, the seventh son of William Cochrane of Ochiltree, and his wife Lady Mary Bruce, eldest daughter of Alexander Bruce, 2nd Earl of Kincardine.

As a younger son, he would not inherit his father's property, so he entered the army. He became a cornet in the Royal Regiment of Dragoons in 1713, and a captain in the 27th Regiment of Foot in 1716. He rose to the rank of major in 1718 and was Fort Major at Fort St Philip on Menorca.

In 1726 he inherited Romanno Grange, midway between Romannobridge and Leadburn (on what is now the A701), changing its name to Lamancha around 1758. The original house was erected by a Robert Hamilton in 1663. It was extended and modernised by Cochrane and a lintel of 1736 probably marks completion of his improvements.

He became Member of Parliament for Renfrewshire in 1722, and represented the constituency until 1727. He was appointed as Commissioner of the Excise for Scotland from 1730 until 1764. He supported the Hanoverians during the Jacobite rising of 1745. He later gave evidence in court against Archibald Stewart, the Lord Provost of Edinburgh, who had surrendered the city to the Jacobites.

Thomas Cochrane acceded to the title of Earl of Dundonald on the death of his distant cousin, William Cochrane, the seventh earl, on 9 July 1758. William, an army officer, had been killed at the Siege of Louisbourg, and died without issue. As the eldest surviving son by then of William Cochrane of Ochiltree, Thomas had already inherited the family estates at Culross and Ochiltree.

== Family and issue ==
Cochrane was married twice, firstly to his cousin, Elizabeth Kerr, in 1721. They had two children, a son Thomas who died young, and a daughter Grizel. Elizabeth died in 1743.

On 6 September 1744, Cochrane married Jane Stuart. They had a number of children, firstly Archibald, born in 1748, who became an inventor and succeeded his father in the earldom, and secondly Charles, born in 1749. He had an army career. Charles married Catherine Pitcairn, the daughter of Major John Pitcairn. He distinguished himself during the American War of Independence by carrying despatches from Sir Henry Clinton to Lord Cornwallis at the Siege of Yorktown. Cornwallis made him his aide-de-camp. Charles Cochrane was killed shortly before the surrender.

Thomas and Jane Cochrane's third son, John, was born in 1750; he became a prosperous contractor for the British army and navy. Their fourth, James Atholl, was born in 1751; he entered the church, becoming vicar for Mansfield and writing a number of books on various subjects. Their fifth son Basil was born in 1753. He made a fortune supplying the Royal Navy in India. Their sixth son Alexander Forrester (later Alexander Inglis) was born in 1758, and entered the Royal Navy. He rose to be admiral of the white, an MP, and a Knight Grand Cross of the Bath.

Their seventh son George Augustus Frederick was born in 1762. He joined the army, reaching the rank of colonel and was an MP. Their eighth and youngest son Andrew James was born in 1767. He also served in the army, reaching the rank of brigadier, sat as MP for several constituencies, and was Governor of Dominica. Less honourably, he was indicted for his role in the Great Stock Exchange Fraud of 1814. Andrew's nephew, the prominent naval officer Thomas Cochrane, Lord Cochrane, was also convicted in this case, but years later received a royal pardon.

Thomas Cochrane died on 31 October 1778. He was succeeded in the earldom by his eldest son Archibald, who became the 9th Earl of Dundonald.

== Citations ==
Parliament of Great Britain
Preceded by Sir Robert Pollock	Member of Parliament for Renfrewshire; 1722–1727	Succeeded by Sir John Shaw
Peerage of Scotland
Preceded by William Cochrane	Earl of Dundonald; 1758–1778	Succeeded by Archibald Cochrane
