= Alexander Cochrane =

Royal Navy officer and politician (1758–1832)

Admiral The Honourable Sir Alexander Cochrane GCB
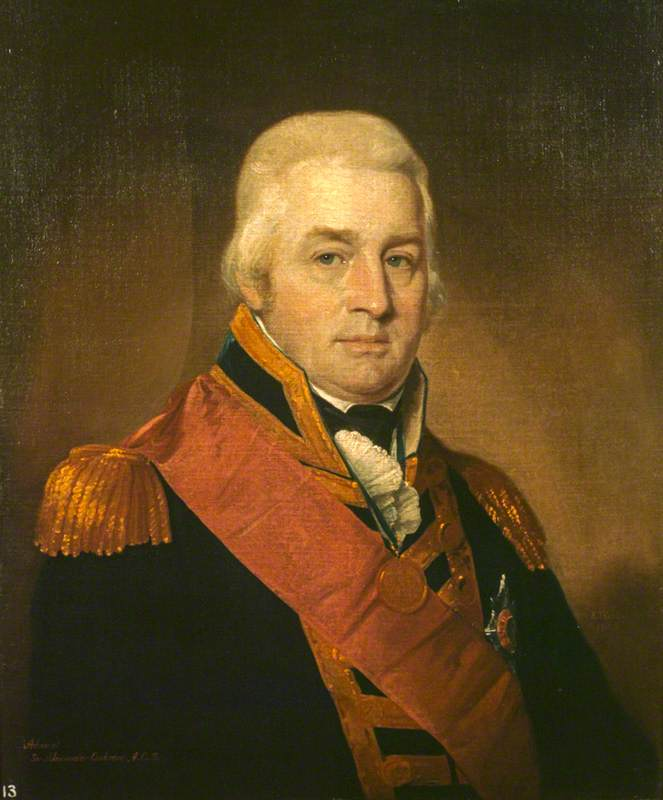
- Portrait by Robert Field, 1809
- Born: Alexander Forrester Cochrane; 23 April 1758; Scotland
- Died: 26 January 1832 (aged 73); Paris, France
- Military career
- Allegiance: Great Britain; United Kingdom
- Branch: Royal Navy
- Service years: c. 1778–1832
- Rank: Admiral of the Blue
- Commands: Leeward Islands Station; Jamaica Station; North American Station; Commander-in-Chief, Plymouth
- Conflicts: American War of Independence; French Revolutionary Wars; French invasion of Egypt and Syria; Siege of Alexandria (1801); Napoleonic Wars; Battle of San Domingo; Invasion of Martinique (1809); War of 1812; Burning of Washington; Battle of Baltimore; Battle of Lake Borgne; Battle of New Orleans
- Awards: Knight Grand Cross of the Order of the Bath

Vice-Admiral of the Red Sir Alexander Inglis Cochrane, GCB (born Alexander Forrester Cochrane; 23 April 1758 – 26 January 1832) was a Royal Navy officer and politician who served in the American War of Independence, French Revolutionary and Napoleonic Wars and War of 1812. He captained HMS Ajax off Alexandria, Egypt during the French invasion of Egypt and Syria. Cochrane was knighted into the Order of the Bath for his services in 1806. In 1814 he became commander-in-chief of the North American Station, led British naval forces during the attacks on Washington and New Orleans, and subsequently became commander-in-chief of the Plymouth naval base.

== Naval career ==
Alexander Inglis Cochrane was born on 23 April 1758 in Scotland. His parents were Thomas Cochrane, 8th Earl of Dundonald and his second wife Jane. Cochrane joined the Royal Navy as a midshipman and served in North America during the American War of Independence, being promoted to lieutenant on 19 May 1778, master and commander on 6 December 1780 and post-captain on 17 December 1782. Cochrane also participated in the final defeat of the French invasion of Egypt and Syria in 1801. When Alexandria fell, Cochrane, in the 74-gun third-rate HMS Ajax, with the sixth-rate HMS Bonne Citoyenne, HMS Cynthia, the brig-sloops HMS Port Mahon and HMS Victorieuse and three Ottomans corvettes, were the first vessels to enter the harbour.

In October 1804, Cochrane alienated the Spanish governor of Ferrol, when one of his commanders intercepted four ships of the Spanish treasure fleet returning from South America, before they reached Cádiz. The effect of the attack was to bring Spain back into the war on France's side in December 1804. Cochrane also had been incensed that Admiral of the White Sir Edward Pellew, a talented "tarpaulin officer" (an officer who had worked up from being a seaman), had been preferred over himself, a well connected aristocrat, to become Commander-in-Chief, East Indies. Cochrane tried to implicate Pellew, who had good relations with the governor of Ferrol, in fraud, then making seriously damaging and unfounded allegations against Pellew's secretary Fitzgerald. These were never substantiated and destroyed Fitzgerald's career but didn't accomplish the destruction of its target, who later became Viscount Exmouth.

== In the Caribbean ==
In 1805 Cochrane was made commander of the Leeward Islands Station. He conducted operations against the French and Spanish on 6 February 1806 at the Battle of San Domingo during the Napoleonic Wars. A cannonball blew his hat off his head while he was on the deck of his flagship, HMS Northumberland. He was appointed Knight Commander of the Order of the Bath on 29 March 1806 in recognition of his service. Other rewards included thanks from both Houses of Parliament, freedom of the city of London, and a sword valued at 100 guineas.

In Barbados, Cochrane met with General Francisco de Miranda, who had been defeated by Spanish naval forces in an attempt to liberate Venezuela. As Spain was then at war with Britain, Cochrane and the governor of Trinidad agreed to provide some support for an unsuccessful second attempt to invade Venezuela.

Following the concern in Britain that neutral Denmark was entering an alliance with Napoleon, Cochrane, now a rear admiral, in 1807 sailed in HMS Belleisle (74 guns) as commander of the squadron of ships that were sent to occupy the Danish West Indies. In 1809 he commanded naval forces in the conquest of Martinique. On 25 October 1809 he was promoted to the rank of Vice Admiral. He held the position of Governor of Guadeloupe from 6 February 1810 to 26 June 1813. Cochrane also owned the "Good Hope" slave plantation in Trinidad.

"No individual had greater responsibility for the decision to recruit and arm American slaves than did Alexander Cochrane." Cochrane formed two Corps of Colonial Marines, made up primarily of escaped slaves. The first corps was based on the island of Marie-Galante and operated from 1808 to 1810. The larger second corps (the first had been disbanded), formed in 1814, was disbanded in 1815, at the conclusion of the War of 1812.

== War of 1812 ==
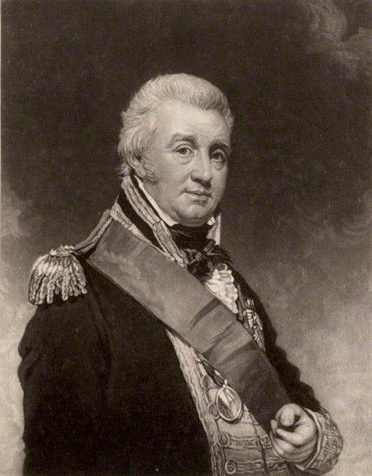
A lithograph of Cochrane

From April 1814, during the War of 1812 against the United States, Cochrane, then a vice admiral, served as commander-in-chief of both the North American Station, based at the new dockyard in Bermuda, and the Jamaica Station, based at Port Royal. He landed the force under Major-General Robert Ross that burned Washington and pushed successful naval forays at the same time. Initially he wanted to attack Rhode Island in New England after the success at Washington, but he was dissuaded by Ross and Rear Admiral George Cockburn, who wanted to go after the bigger prize of Baltimore, Maryland.

Cochrane was appointed the Commander-in-Chief, North American Station (1814–1815). His correspondence log commences with mention of the correspondence dated 27 December 1813 from the Admiralty which formally appointed him as successor to Sir John Warren.

Asia served as the flagship for Vice Admiral Sir Alexander Cochrane from 27 January 1814. Then, Tonnant served as the flagship for Vice Admiral Sir Alexander Cochrane from 9 June 1814 onwards. Cochrane approved the plan proposed by Rear Admiral Sir George Cockburn, 10th Baronet to attack Washington, after the latter predicted that "within a short period of time, with enough force, we could easily have at our mercy the capital". The 4,500 troops, commanded by Major General Robert Ross, successfully captured the capital city on 24 August 1814; Ross then directed the Burning of Washington but refused suggestions by both Cochrane and Cockburn to raze the city. Ross ordered his troops to cause no damage to private property.

It was aboard Cochrane's flagship, HMS Tonnant, near the mouth of the Potomac on 7 September 1814 that Francis Scott Key and Colonel John Skinner pleaded for and got the release of Doctor William Beanes, a civilian who had been taken prisoner in Upper Marlboro after withdrawing from the assault on Washington. The next day Key, Skinner and Beanes were transferred to the frigate HMS Surprise, with their truce vessel in tow, as the fleet slowly moved up the Chesapeake toward Baltimore. They would not be released until the assault on Baltimore was completed. On 11 September, Skinner insisted they be put back on their own truce vessel which they were allowed to do, under guard.

The morning of the 12th, 4500 British troops landed on the North Point peninsula and started marching toward Baltimore. Major General Robert Ross was killed by sniper fire in a skirmish that afternoon during the Battle of North Point.

Cochrane transferred his flag to HMS Surprise to facilitate moving up the Patapsco River to direct the 25-hour bombardment of Fort McHenry outside Baltimore (13 and 14 September), which proved ineffectual. He resisted calls by his junior officers to attack the fort more aggressively with frigates at close range. He ordered a diversionary raid by boats, around 1am on the 14th, to assist the army encamped near Baltimore in their proposed attack on Hampstead Hill (which they cancelled and withdrew), but this diversion had no success. In the bombardment of Fort McHenry, Cochrane's fleet used bomb vessels and a rocket ship for a long-range bombardment to minimize casualties and damage to the fleet from the fort's return fire, which inspired Francis Scott Key's poem that became "The Star-Spangled Banner", the US national anthem.

Cochrane controlled the soldiers and marines on ships during the Battle of New Orleans. His forces built a hard short road to New Orleans for use by British armed forces. The British army was defeated at the Battle of New Orleans on 8 January 1815 and Cochrane received some criticism for his role in that loss, which prevented the British from gaining a foothold in the US.

The Duke of Wellington was particularly vociferous in his criticism. He claimed that the failure of the New Orleans campaign was largely the fault of Cochrane. In a eulogy to General Edward Pakenham (Wellington's brother-in-law, killed at New Orleans), he said:

I cannot but regret that he was ever employed on such a service or with such a colleague. The expedition to New Orleans originated with that colleague ... The Americans were prepared with an army in a fortified position which still would have been carried, if the duties of others, that is of the Admiral (Sir Alexander Cochrane), had been as well performed as that of he whom we now lament.

Prior to returning to Great Britain in 1815, he protested against accusations by Monroe that Black refugees had been sold into slavery in the West Indies. Firstly, he wrote to Monroe on 8 March, then he raised the matter in a letter he composed on 13 March 1815 with the Secretary to the Admiralty on the matter. (Note: In consequence of the assertions of Mr. Monroe, the American Secretary of State, that Blacks had been taken off from the United States, sent to the West Indies, and there sold as slaves, Sir Alexander Cochran, before he left Bermuda, addressed an official letter on the subject to the American Government, in which he disproves the calumny, and demands Monroe's grounds on which he made the assertion. The Admiral concludes his letter by observing, that if Mr. Monroe's informants had been acquainted with the regulations established in all the British West India Islands since the abolition of the Slave Trade, they would have known the total impossibility of introducing slaves into any of them in the manner they state.)

Vice Admiral Cochrane continued to lobby the Secretary of the Admiralty for the men of the Corps of Colonial Marines to be retained on Bermuda. In the past, he had been criticised for the manner in which captured slaves had been placed on his plantation in Trinidad. It was important for his public reputation to avoid this being brought up again. Cochrane transferred his pennant to the Puissant on 15 May 1815.

In spite of bearing some responsibility for the loss at New Orleans, Cochrane was later promoted to Admiral on 12 August 1819. From 1821 to 1824, he was Commander-in-Chief, Plymouth. He died in Paris on 26 January 1832.

== Political career ==
Cochrane was a Member of Parliament (MP) for Stirling Burghs from 1800 to 1802, and from 1803 to 1806.

== Family ==
In 1788, he married Maria Shaw; they had three sons and two daughters. His son Thomas John Cochrane was entered in the Royal Navy at the age of seven; he rose to become governor of the colony of Newfoundland, and Admiral of the Fleet; he was appointed Knight of the Order of the Bath.

Alexander Cochrane was the sixth of the surviving sons of Thomas Cochrane, 8th Earl of Dundonald. The eldest son Archibald Cochrane became the earl and lost the family lands on a series of inventions and investments. Many of the younger sons served in the military or had careers supplying it. The next brother, Charles, served in the army and was killed at the Siege of Yorktown; he had married to Catherine, the daughter of Major John Pitcairn. The third surviving son, John Cochrane, was a paymaster and provisioner to the army and navy. His children included Nathaniel Day Cochrane, who became a rear admiral, and probably the chess player John Cochrane. The next son, Basil Cochrane, made a fortune supplying the Royal Navy in India. Alexander was the sixth son. The seventh, George Augustus Frederick Cochrane, had an army career and served in Parliament. The youngest son, Andrew Cochrane-Johnstone, was an army officer, colonial governor, politician, and fraudster.

The Earl of St. Vincent wrote of the Cochrane brothers in 1806, "The Cochranes are not to be trusted out of sight, they are all mad, romantic, money-getting and not truth-telling—and there is not a single exception in any part of the family."

== Legacy ==
- Namesake of Admiral Rock, Nova Scotia

== Arms ==
Coat of arms of Sir Alexander Cochrane
Crest A horse passant Argent; Augmentation: Out of a naval crown Or, a dexter arm embowed, vested Azure, cuffed Argent, the hand holding a flagstaff proper, thereon hoisted the flag of an admiral of the white (Note: Some sources seem to describe flag of a rear admiral, however Cochrane's stall plate clearly depicts it as that of a full admiral. In any case, he was promoted to the rank of admiral, and as such, it is appropriate for his arms to depict the flag as such.), being Argent, a cross Gules, and thereon the words "St. Domingo" in letters Or Escutcheon Argent a chevron Gules between three boar heads Azure on a chief of the last a sphinx couchant of the first Supporters On either side a greyhound Argent collared and leashed and supporting a flag staff Or thereon hoisted the flag of an admiral of the white being Argent a cross Gules and thereon the words "ST. DOMINGO" in letters Or. Motto VIRTUTE ET LABORE (Latin for 'By valour and exertion') Orders Order of the Bath: TRIA JUNCTA IN UNO (Latin for 'three joined in one')

== Bibliography ==
- "Film reel 7, Admiralty Records, North America, 1813–1815", Admirals' Journals Reel contains two volumes: Pulteney Malcolm, 1813 Oct. 1 – 1815 Sept. 10; and Sir A. F. I. Cochrane, 1813 Dec. 27 – 1815 May 11., War of 1812 Documents from the British National Archives microfilm, The Historic New Orleans Collection, 2006, ADM 50/87, ADM 50/122 – via film viewed at research center 5 January 2022
- Anderson, William. (1862). The Scottish Nation: Or The Surnames, Families, Literature, Honours, and Biographical History of the People of Scotland. Fullarton.
- Clowes, Sir William (1901). The Royal Navy: Vol. 6: A History – From the Earliest Times to 1900. S. Low, Marston and Co. ISBN 1-86176-013-2.
- Cundall, Frank (1915). Historic Jamaica. West India Committee.
- Grant, John N. (1990). Immigration and Settlement of the Black Refugees of the War of 1812 in Nova Scotia and New Brunswick (PDF). Hantsport, N.S.: Lancelot Press. ISBN 0-88999-437-4.
- Hall, Christopher David (1992). British Strategy in the Napoleonic War, 1803–15. Manchester University Press. ISBN 978-0-7190-3606-4.
- Haydn, Joseph (2008) [1851]. The Book of Dignities: Containing Lists of the Official Personages of the British Empire ... from the Earliest Periods to the Present Time ... Together with the Sovereigns and Rulers of Europe, from the Foundation of Their Respective States; the Peerage of England and Great Britain. Longmans, Brown, Green, and Longmans – via Google Books.
- Hughes, Christine F.; Brodine, Charles E., eds. (2023). The Naval War of 1812: A Documentary History, Vol. 4. Washington: Naval Historical Center (GPO). ISBN 978-1-943604-36-4.
- Lee, Christopher (20 November 2014). Nelson and Napoleon: The Long Haul to Trafalgar. Faber & Faber. ISBN 978-0-571-32168-1.
- The first edition of this text is available at Wikisource: Stephen, Leslie, ed. (1887). "Cochrane, Alexander Forrester Inglis" . Dictionary of National Biography. Vol. 11. London: Smith, Elder & Co. pp. 159–160.
- MacDougall, Philip, ed. (April 2017) [9 June 2012]. "Bermuda Dockyard and the War of 1812". Transactions of the Naval Dockyard Society. 10. conference held at the National Museum of Bermuda, Royal Naval Dockyard. ISBN 978-0-9929292-1-3.
- Marshall, John (1823). "Cochrane, Alexander Inglis" . Royal Naval Biography. Vol. 1, part 1. London: Longman and Company. pp. 257–266.
- Millett, Nathaniel (2013). The Maroons of Prospect Bluff and Their Quest for Freedom in the Atlantic World. University Press of Florida. ISBN 978-0-8130-4454-5 – via Florida Scholarship online within Oxford University Press.

Parliament of Great Britain
Preceded by William Tait	Member of Parliament for Stirling Burghs; February 1800 – December 1800	Succeeded by Parliament of the United Kingdom
Parliament of the United Kingdom
Preceded by Parliament of Great Britain	Member of Parliament for Stirling Burghs; 1801–1806	Succeeded by Sir John Henderson, Bt
Military offices
Preceded by Robert Stopford	Commander-in-Chief, Leeward Islands Station; 1805–1811	Succeeded by Sir Francis Laforey
Preceded by Sir John Warren	Commander-in-Chief, North American Station; 1814–1815	Succeeded by Sir David Milne
Preceded by William Brown	Commander-in-Chief, Jamaica Station; 1814–1815	Succeeded by John Erskine Douglas
Preceded by Viscount Exmouth	Commander-in-Chief, Plymouth; 1821–1824	Succeeded by Sir James Saumarez
