= Charles Cochrane =

Charles Cochrane may refer to:

- Charles Cochrane (engineer) (1835–1898), British engineer
- Charles Cochrane (social reformer) (1807–1855), British social reformer
- Charles Cochrane-Baillie, 2nd Baron Lamington (1860–1940), British politician and colonial governor
- Charles H. Cochrane (1943–2008), first openly gay New York City policeman
- Charles Norris Cochrane (1889–1945), Canadian historian and philosopher
- Charles Stuart Cochrane (1796–after 1844), Scottish traveller and author
- Charles Walter Hamilton Cochrane (1876–1932), British colonial administrator in Malaya
