= Satinette =

Satinette may refer to:

- Satinet, a finely woven fabric
- a variation of the Oriental Frill, a breed of fancy pigeons
