= John Capron =

American politician

The Capron mill, built by John Capron Sr. and his sons Effingham, and John, circa 1820, at Uxbridge, Massachusetts. The mill manufactured the first satinets, used the first power looms for woolens in America, and made US military uniforms for over 140 years.

John Willard Capron (February 14, 1797, at Uxbridge, Worcester County, Massachusetts – December 25, 1878, at Uxbridge) was an American military officer in the infantry, state legislator, and textile manufacturer. Famous for being a military uniforms manufacturer, he became Colonel in the army and Chairman of the Board of Selectmen.

== Early life, family ==
Gravestone of Revolutionary war soldier, John Capron Sr. at Prospect Hill Cemetery, overlooking the mill that he and his sons, John and Effingham began in 1820 at Uxbridge, Massachusetts

John Willard Capron was the son of a Revolutionary War soldier, John Capron Sr. John Capron Sr. was born on July 3, 1756, at Cumberland, Rhode Island and died in 1836 at Uxbridge. John Capron Sr. had at least two sons. They were, John Willard Capron, of this article, and his sibling, Effingham Capron. Effingham developed fame in the mills and later became a prominent abolitionist. Effingham was the eldest son. John Willard Capron grew up in Uxbridge and graduated from Uxbridge Academy. Uxbridge Academy graduated a number of prominent men in the early 19th century. John Capron Sr. their father started a very historic textile mill in 1820. John's father was a "clothier" who had migrated here from North Grosvenordale, Connecticut, circa 1790.

== Family heritage ==
The family in New England descended from Banfield Capron who immigrated from England to Attleboro, MA in the 17th century. Another branch of the Banfield Capron family, Erastus Capron, participated in the Mexican War. He was a hero of that war, settled in FL and participated in the Seminole Indian wars, and Fort Capron at Indian River county, was named for him. There is also a town of Capron, Illinois, named for General Horace Capron who led the Illinois Regiment in the Civil War. The descendants of Banfield Capron through the 1800s is published in a book on the Capron family. There are end footnotes to this paragraph in the Banfield Capron reference noting John C Capron, Effingham Capron and John Willard Capron as descendants of Banfield Capron, the first American Capron immigrant.

== Family business ==
John Willard Capron helped his father John Sr. and his brother Effingham, to establish one of the earliest textile mills in the historic mill town of Uxbridge. The Capron Mill was started by John, John W. and Effingham's father, circa 1820. The three Capron men later entered into a partnership for the business.

The mill became known as the Capron Mill. John Capron Sr., John W. Capron's father, sited the mill on the Mumford River, in the town center, also known as Uxbridge center. The mill used water power from the river, a renewable source of power. John Capron had purchased the Colonel Seth Read estate, and water mill on the Mumford River when he first came to Uxbridge around 1790. Colonel John Capron, John Sr.'s son, was a prominent citizen in this community. The community is known for some of the earliest beginnings of America's Industrial Revolution. It is part of the historic Blackstone River Valley and National Heritage Corridor of the National Park Service. The mill was the first mill to use power looms for the woolen industry.

The first power looms for woolens were introduced at the Capron Mills. These were made in a machine shop at Cumberland, Rhode Island. These were reportedly the first power looms ever made for woolens. The first manufacture of "satinet" was at this mill. Uxbridge became famous for its Cashmere wool. The town of Uxbridge was a business incubator for the cashmere wool industry, satinets, and power looms in the textile industry of America. Effingham Capron, John Capron Sr. and Colonel John W. Capron were pioneers in textile manufacturing in America. John Willard Capron also served multiple roles in the community. He was Postmaster, Chairman of the Board of Selectmen, Notary, and served in the state legislature. Effingham Capron also became a noted anti-slavery champion, and rose to national prominence in the anti-slavery movement.

== Capron Mill in U.S. history ==
The Capron Mill, started by John Capron, the father, was made famous for military uniforms which were made here from at least the Civil War period, up through World War II, and including "the first U.S. Air Force uniform" which became known as the "Uxbridge Blue" During John Capron's tenure, the mills of Uxbridge including Capron Mills ran 24/7 during the American Civil War producing military uniforms. This mill later became the Bernat Mill known for yarns in the later 20th century, and was the third largest yarn factory in the U.S. On 21 July 2007, this historic mill, begun by Colonel Capron's family, was nearly totally destroyed, in the 10-alarm Bernat Mill Fire at Uxbridge. The oldest part of the historic mill, the original Capron Mill, made of wood, was virtually completely saved from the fire, by the efforts of 66 fire departments and a two-state response. The fire burned 400,000 square feet (37,000 m^{2}) of the more modern brick-and-steel complex at Mendon and Depot Streets. Mill owners plan to rebuild.

== Death and afterward, Capron Park ==
Colonel John W. Capron died December 25, 1878, at the age of 81, at Uxbridge, Worcester County, Massachusetts. A historic park, "Capron Park", alongside the Mumford River, in Uxbridge center, today commemorates Effingham and his prominence in the abolition movement in Massachusetts and the Northeastern US. The father, Colonel John Capron, his two sons, John Willard Capron and Effingham L. Capron, and the Historic Mill, known as the Capron Mill which was a pacesetter in the textile industry of the United States. This family is descended from Banfield Capron of Attleboro, Massachusetts. There is an entire book on the Capron family in America. The Capron Park was dedicated in 2009 to Effingham Capron's legacy work by an act of the Massachusetts legislature. The park is across the street from the historic mill.

== See also ==
- List of Registered Historic Places in Uxbridge, Massachusetts
- Blackstone River Valley National Heritage Corridor
