= Bernat Mill =

Yarn mill in Uxbridge, Massachusetts, U.S.

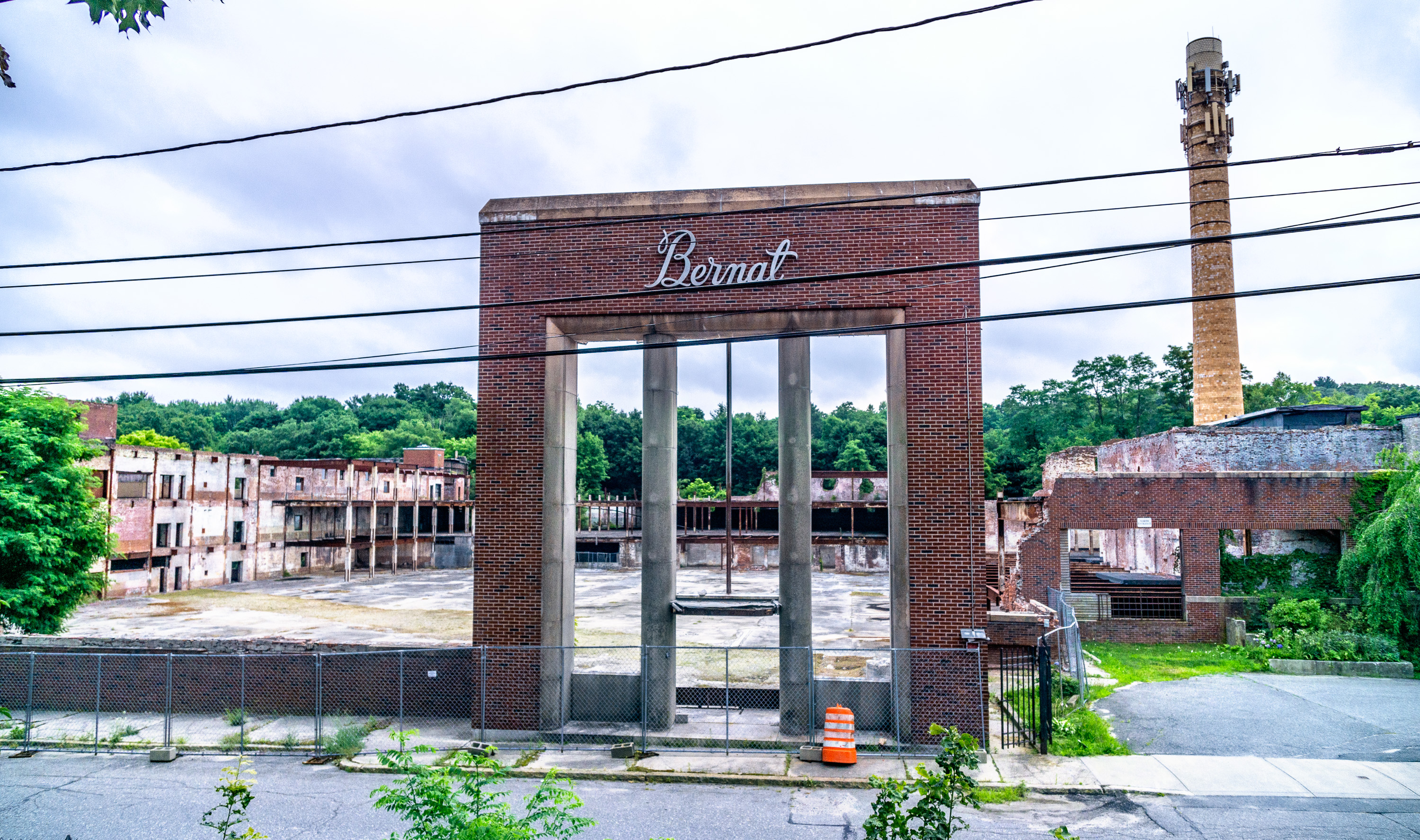
Bernat Mill ruins in 2020

The Bernat Mill, also known as Capron Mill, and later Bachman Uxbridge Worsted Company, was an American yarn mill in Uxbridge, Massachusetts, that was for the most part destroyed by fire on July 21, 2007.

This mill complex at Uxbridge had been a hub of manufacturing for Bernat, once based in Jamaica Plain, Massachusetts. The town of Uxbridge was the site of Bernat's main manufacturing unit in the later 20th century. This was the third largest yarn mill in the U.S. The Bernat mill and the town of Uxbridge have a role in U.S. history, and the history of the American textile manufacturing.

"Bernat" is a trademark of an existing company which manufactures yarn products.

== History ==
Capron Mill, built by John Capron Sr. and his sons Effingham, and John, c. 1820, at Uxbridge, Massachusetts. The mill manufactured the first satinets, used the first power looms for woolens in America, and made U.S. military uniforms for over 140 years.

The original mill, the Capron Mill, was built in 1820, by John Capron, the father of Colonel John Capron and anti-slavery champion Effingham Capron on the Mumford River at Uxbridge Center. The first power looms for woolens were introduced at the Capron Mills. These were made in a machine shop at Cumberland, Rhode Island. These were reportedly the first power looms ever made for woolens in the U.S. The first manufacture of "satinet" was at this mill. Uxbridge became famous for its Cashmere wool. The period of the Capron Mill, and later as the Bachman Uxbridge Worsted Company was famous for manufacture of clothing and the manufacture of military uniforms for the United States.

== The Bachman Uxbridge Worsted Company ==
The mill was featured in the August 24, 1953, edition of Time magazine, in an article entitled, "The Pride of Uxbridge" as the site of the Bachman Uxbridge Worsted Company, which was then one of the most successful textile mills in New England. The Time article interviewed the CEO of Bachman Uxbridge Worsted Company, Harold Walter. This company had been started by Edward Bachman of New York City, and Harold Walters's father-in-law, Charles Arthur Root, of Uxbridge. This site was the hub of seven plants throughout the U.S., employing 6000 plus workers, and some of its wool synthetic blends dominated the women's fashion industry in the early 1950s.

The first woolen mill in the Blackstone Valley was built in Uxbridge in 1809-10 (3rd in U.S.), and by 1953, the Bachman Uxbridge Worsted Company was on the verge of a merger with the debt laden American Woolen Company to become the largest U.S. woolen manufacturer. The Town of Uxbridge had become synonymous with woolen manufacturing, "blended fabrics", complete vertical integration of textiles to clothing, and textile industry efficiency innovations, when production peaked in the early 1950s.

Research into textiles at Bachman Uxbridge Worsted Company produced a range of blended fabrics, including the "wool-nylon serge" used for army uniforms. The original U.S. Air Force Uniform produced at the factory was dubbed and patented "Uxbridge Blue" or "Uxbridge 1683", after blue dye color selected at Bachman Uxbridge. This dye was used in the manufacture of uniforms from 1947.

"In January 1948 President Truman approved authorization of the proposed new blue Air Force uniform and a week after that Air Force Chief of Staff Hoyt Vandenberg officially circulated word that funding had been approved by the congressional appropriations committee. The new uniform, incorporating a shade of blue fabric (patented as 'Uxbridge Blue' and based on 'Uxbridge 1683 Blue, cable shade 84', developed at the former Bachman-Uxbridge Worsted Company) would be available for distribution by September 1950". Shortly thereafter, on March 29, 1954, Time magazine reported: "American Woolen Co. will ask its stockholders to approve a merger with Bachmann Uxbridge Worsted Corp. As a combined operation, troubled American Woolen (1953 sales, $73,494,160; net loss, $9,476,981) and Bachmann Uxbridge (1953 sales, $52,609,000; profit, $272,000) would be by far the biggest woolen manufacturer in the country. Textron, Inc., which wants American Woolen to merge with it, and claims to own almost 4% of American Woolen's stock, plans to fight the merger".

The merger of American Woolen and Bachman Uxbridge was however blocked by Textron, which emerged in the 1960s as a Providence, Rhode Island, based conglomerate. This was Bachman Uxbridge's last bid to be the largest woolen company in America. By 1964 the assets of Bachman Uxbridge were sold to Bernat Yarn of Jamaica Plain, Massachusetts.

American Civil War uniforms, World War I khaki overcoats, and World War II U.S. Army uniforms have all been manufactured in this mill. Latch hook yarn kits were developed by Bernat, here circa 1968 and the name of the mill changes to the Bernat Mill, then the third largest U.S. yarn mill.

=== 2007 fire ===
Early, on the Saturday morning of July 21, 2007, a fire erupted at the historic mill, devastating the complex on Mendon and Depot Street. 600 firefighters from 66 communities battled the blaze, but the complex was nearly totally destroyed. It took three days to extinguish the flames fully. At the time of the fire, the 400,000 square feet (37,000 m^{2}) structure, had ceased operating as a mill and had been converted into space containing 65 small businesses. The business losses following the fire were estimated in the millions of dollars and between 300 and 500 people lost their jobs.

=== Fire cause and aftermath ===
The fire marshall's report concluded that there was unpermitted welding occurring in a mill business, the sprinkler was not operable, and that both contributed to the fire. Mill owners planned to rebuild. The two-state incident command, disaster response was viewed as a regional model. Senator John Kerry introduced loans from his committee in the U.S. Senate to support the business owners impacted by the fire. Governor Deval Patrick left the National Governors' Conference in Michigan to return to Uxbridge to be present for the immediate recovery. Governor Patrick invoked immediate state and federal aide to victims and businesses of the Uxbridge mill fire. Hurricane Katrina funds were applied to the relief efforts. As of 2009, plans to rebuild were on hold.

The eight-acre mill site, still mostly in ruins but with "several remaining buildings," was sold to a Mendon businessman in 2020. As of December 2025, space is available for leasing of townhouses and/or possible commercial properties.

== See also ==
- Blackstone River Valley National Heritage Corridor
