= Johnstons of Elgin =

British luxury fashion brand

- Type: Private
- Industry: Wholesale manufacturer and retailer
- Founded: 1797
- Headquarters: Elgin, Moray, Scotland
- Products: Woven and knitted products
- Website: www.johnstonsofelgin.com

Johnstons of Elgin is a Scottish family-owned luxury fashion brand and manufacturer. Johnstons was founded in 1797 and is based in Elgin, Scotland.

Its process is split across two Scottish mills, a "vertically integrated" weaving mill in Elgin, where it has been headquartered since 1800, and a knitting mill in the Scottish Border town of Hawick.

The company holds three royal warrants of appointment for the manufacture of Estate Tweeds, Knitwear, and Woven Accessories. It sells direct-to-consumer under its own name, and is also a supplier for the luxury fashion industry, including brands like Hermès, Chanel, Louis Vuitton, Ralph Lauren, and Burberry.

== History ==
=== Founding ===
Johnstons of Elgin was founded in 1797 in Elgin, Scotland by Alexander Johnston (1774-1864). It was originally founded at Deanshaugh in Elgin, where Alexander was working at the time, but was soon moved to a small meal mill called ‘Newmill’ on the banks of The River Lossie in Elgin, where it remains today. Machinery was purchased for the processing of wool and by 1811 the mill was vertically integrated with carding, dying, spinning, weaving and finishing all done on site. The mill remains the only vertical weaving mill still in operation in Scotland today. The company made its first international sale to Nova Scotia in 1813.

=== Estate Tweeds ===
Estate Tweeds were introduced in the late 1840s as a form of camouflage for country estate workers. Johnstons of Elgin wove its first Estate Tweed in 1845, for MacDougalls of Inverness and invoiced as "Lord Lovat’s Mixture". The company wove the first Super Balmoral for Queen Victoria and Prince Albert in 1853. Johnstons of Elgin has held a royal warrant from HRH Prince Charles for the manufacture of Estate Tweeds since 2013.

=== Luxury Fibres ===
In 1835 Alexander’s son James Johnston (1815-1897) joined the business. He was responsible for introducing Australian Merino to the business in 1847, Vicuna in 1849 and Cashmere in 1851. In 1851 Johnstons of Elgin exhibited at the Great Exhibition of the Works of Industry of All Nations at the Crystal Palace in Hyde Park, London.

Mauds, or plaids, made of undyed or natural brown wool, of different kinds of countries, viz., Cheviot, Southdown, Australian, Peruvian, Alpaca, Vicuna &c. They are used as a wrapper for the shoulders in walking, or for the knees in driving.

Ends, twenty yards each, natural brown tweed, of different wools, waterproofed. These cloths are exhibited for cheapness and durability.

The company won a gold medal at the Edinburgh International Exhibition in October 1886 for “excellence in vicuna rugs”.

=== Export ===
James Johnston continued to increase the company’s export trade. In 1853 he sent plaids and tweed suits to Australia. In 1855 he exhibited more rare fibre cloths, rugs and shawls at the Exposition Universelle in Paris and would be awarded a diploma at a subsequent Exposition Universelle in 1867 and two bronze medals in 1878. By 1880 France would be at the heart of Johnstons of Elgin’s European market, which included Italy, Germany and Belgium. The company was also sending Scottish plaids, rugs and tweeds to South America and Japan by 1880 and in 1882 it sent "a shipment of 20 assorted rugs" to New York.

Johnstons of Elgin received the Queen’s Award for Export Achievement in 1978, 1997 and 2002. The company also received an ‘Award for Outstanding Achievement in Exporting to Japan’ in 1994.

=== Harrison Ownership ===
James Johnston’s son Charles J. Johnston (1845-1940) joined the company in 1865 and succeeded his father as Chairman in 1894. His son Charles Ernest Johnston (1871-1918) joined the company in 1891 and was set to take over the Chairmanship when his father retired, however, Charles Ernest was fatally wounded during the First World War.

Johnstons of Elgin was sold to Edward Stroud Harrison (1879-1979) in 1920. ES Harrison had joined the company in 1904 as a designer and assistant to Charles Ernest Johnston. Today the company is co-chaired by ES Harrison’s great-grandchildren, Neil and Jenny Urquhart.

=== Expansion into Knitting ===
In 1980 Johnstons of Elgin purchased Eastfield Mill in the Scottish border town of Hawick. Eastfield Mill had been constructed in 1882 for Blenkhorn, Richardson & Co., tweed manufacturers and remained in their hands until the 1970s. Johnstons of Elgin began to produce knitted accessories at the Hawick site, later expanding into knitted garments. The company utilises Shima Seiki knitting machines and is one of the Japanese company’s key European partners.

The Hawick Mill received the Borders Business Excellence Award for Manufacturer and Exporter of the Year in 2017, and in 2024 the company received a further two royal warrants from HM The King for Knitwear and Woven Accessories.

=== Growing the Brand ===
The Johnstons of Elgin brand began in the 1930s when ES Harrison designed the company marque depicting a ‘J’, thistle and bee. Labels bearing this marque began to appear on blankets, scarves and tailoring woven at the Elgin mill. With the purchase of the Hawick mill in 1980 the company began to add basic knitwear and accessories to its list of products. By the early 2000s Johnstons was pushing the design side of the brand even further. In 2008 the company won The Outstanding Contribution to Scottish Style Award.

In 2015 Johnstons of Elgin opened its flagship London store on New Bond Street, and in 2018 the company gave its first presentation at London Fashion week.

== Social and environment ==
In an effort to attract young people to its mills and continue the artisanal expertise required to produce its products Johnstons of Elgin developed a Schools Interaction Programme, working with Primary and Secondary schools to introduce students to the variety of career opportunities available within the company. In 2012 Johnstons joined the Modern Apprenticeship programme, and in 2015 it became a Scottish Qualifications Agency accreditation centre. In 2022 the company won the Investors in Young People Gold accreditation for the recruitment, development and retention of Scotland’s young people.

The company has received several awards over the years, including the Queen’s Award for Enterprise in the Sustainability category in 2021.

Johnstons of Elgin has been a certified B corporation since 2023, and is one of three founding members of the Sustainable Fibre Alliance.

In 2015 Johnstons of Elgin were one of three founding members of the non-profit, international organisation, the Sustainable Fibre Alliance (SFA) working alongside Mongolian cashmere goat-herders to promote sustainable grassland management. By 2024 the company aims to purchase 100% of its cashmere fibre from SFA-certified sources. Johnstons of Elgin also continue to source Merino wool from Australian suppliers only purchasing wool that is Responsible Wool Standard (RWS) certified.
