= Old Fashioned Oriental Frill =

Breed of pigeon

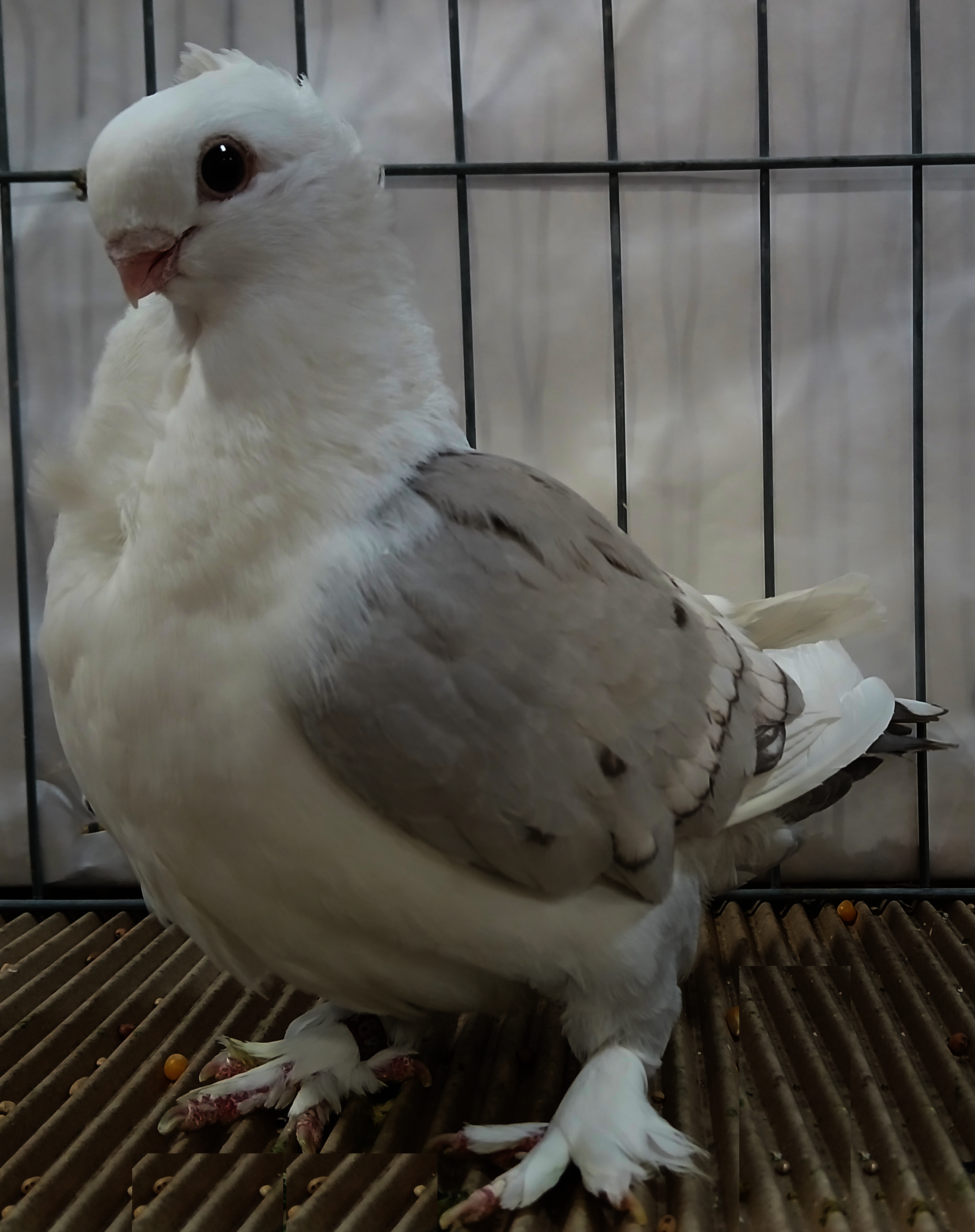
- Looking at you
- Conservation status: Common in the US.
- Other names: Classic Frill
- Country of origin: Turkey
- Distribution: Europe, US
- Type: Show

Traits
- Weight: Male: 16oz; Female: 15oz
- Crest type: shell to fan shape
- Lifespan: 12 years
- Length: 14 inches
- eye color: bull

Classification
- Australian: Not listed
- European: Not listed
- US: Owl & Frills

The Classic Oriental Frill is an exhibition breed of pigeon from the Owl family.

It is a Turkish breed specially bred for the Ottoman Sultans. In its homeland it is known as Hünkari: the bird of the Sultans.

It is known that upon the sultans' request a special breed of pigeon was bred in the Manisa Palace. (Manisa is an old Ottoman city in western Turkey). The pigeon breeders of the sultan developed this unique breed of pigeon. For centuries the breed was kept away from the common people. This is one of the reasons why Hünkari is still known as the bird of the sultans in its homeland. The white spots on the tail is called "the seal of the Sultan". That's why it is an important feature in the standard of the Satinettes.

The "Hünkari", or as it's known today outside Turkey, "the Oriental Frill" was first imported to England by H. P. Caridia in 1864 from İzmir. It was first exhibited in National Columbarian Society in 1879 in America.

Today the breed has strong followers at home and abroad.

== Characteristics ==
It is the precursor breed from which the Modern Oriental Frill was created via selective breeding methods. The Old Fashioned or Original Hünkari (Oriental Frill) possess less exaggerated features unlike the Modern Oriental Frill of today. The Old Fashioned Oriental Frill or Classic Old Frill can still feed their own young, called squabs, by regurgitation, because their beaks have not been bred down to such an extremely short and blunt shape as in the new style Modern Oriental Frills. There is therefore no need for foster feeders, of another long-beaked breed, such as homers, to feed the Old Fashioned Oriental Frill or Classic Oriental Frill squabs. The old style Hünkari (Oriental Frill) is still a good flyer as it is not bred in larger sizes like the Modern Oriental Frill.

A small to medium-sized (average weight 11-12 oz) cobby pigeon, with a jaunty disposition. Stations at near to a 45-degree angle with the tip of the tail just clearing the floor. Typical characteristics include a breast frill, peak crest, grouse muffs, and a medium-short thick beak. Satinettes are shield marked / tail marked birds with white bars or laces on their shield and Moon Spots or laces on their tail. Blondinettes are whole colored birds which also possess white bars or lacing on the shields and Moon Spots or lacing on the tail...Some varieties have the lacing extending over most of the body.

- Head: Roundish to slightly oval, substantial, wide. Arched forehead that flows in a smooth, continuous curve from the tip of the beak to the tip of the peak. Wattle small and neat.
- Eye: Large, bright and prominent. Eye cere fine in texture and flesh colored. Bull eyes in Satinettes. The eye in Blondinettes to be yellow gravel to deep red brown depending upon the variety.
- Beak: Medium short in length, substantial/thick, blending into the forehead in a smooth, uninterrupted curve. Flesh colored in Satinettes, flesh to horn to black in Blondinettes, depending upon the variety. Wattle small and smooth. Classic Old Frills can feed their young and do not need feeders.
- Crest: Needlepoint Peak Crest. Upright and central. Rising at least as high as the highest part of the head. Peak crest supported by a well-developed mane, without any sign of a mane break. (The indentation between the Peak Crest and the mane.)
- Neck: Short and strong, appearing thick due to the mane at the back of the neck, and the gullet. Held proudly, and upright so that the eye is directly over the juncture of the toes with the ankle. There should be a pronounced gullet extending from just under the lower mandible down the throat into the frill.
- Frill: The frill should extend from the middle of the gullet and continue into the breast (ideally 2" in length). It should be well developed and profuse. A shorter, more profuse frill is preferred over one that is sparse but greater in length. Feathers to grow outward to both sides uniformly. Feathers that grow only to one side or disproportionately to one side will be penalized. Rose shaped frills will be penalized.
- Breast: Breast is broad, well rounded, and held forward prominently.
- Back: Tapering towards the tail. Firm, compact, and cobby.
- Wings: Strong, lying close to the body, covering the back, without "sails", with short flight feathers and lying flat on the tail.
- Legs: Short, profusely covered with grouse muffs all the way to the toenails. Toenails to be white in Satinettes flesh to horn to black in Blondinettes depending upon the variety.
- Plumage: Well developed, tight, lying flat with the exception of the Frill and the Peak Crest.
- Tail: No more than 2 feathers in width, shorter rather than longer, just clearing the floor when in show position.
- Station: Upright station at near to a 45-degree angle, which causes the tail to be held downward rather than horizontal.
- Color: While no preference is given to any one color, all colors should be bright, smooth and even. In laced birds the lacing should be clear and distinct. In barred birds the bars should be clear, narrow. long and even. The color inside the bars or laces should be white. The color inside the Moon Spots or tail laces should be white. The factors which give the Oriental Frill its unique coloring are Toy Stencil and Frill Stencil, in combination. Toy Stencil affecting mainly the body and Frill Stencil affecting mainly the tail. Without these factors in proper combination, various shades of color will be produced, from normal coloration to bronzes/ sulphurs and a root beer coloration, in their various hues. Toy Stencil and Frill Stencil causes the whitening effect that one sees in a well marked Oriental Frill.

== Gallery ==
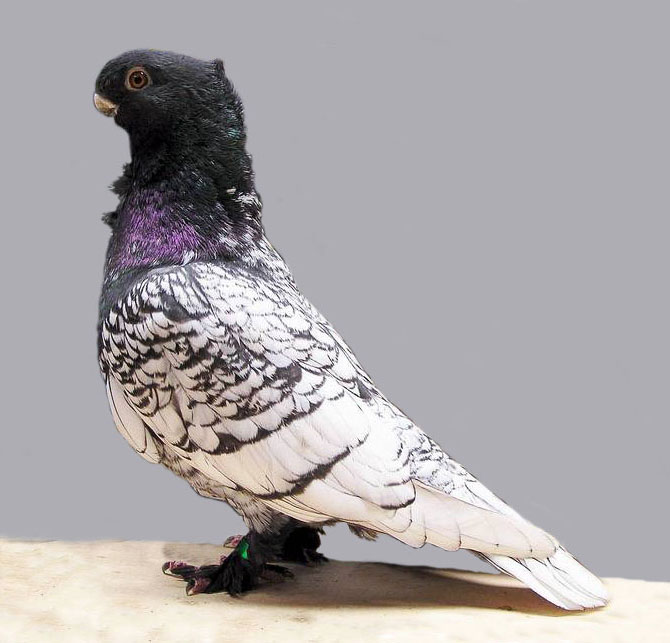
Black laced Blondinette

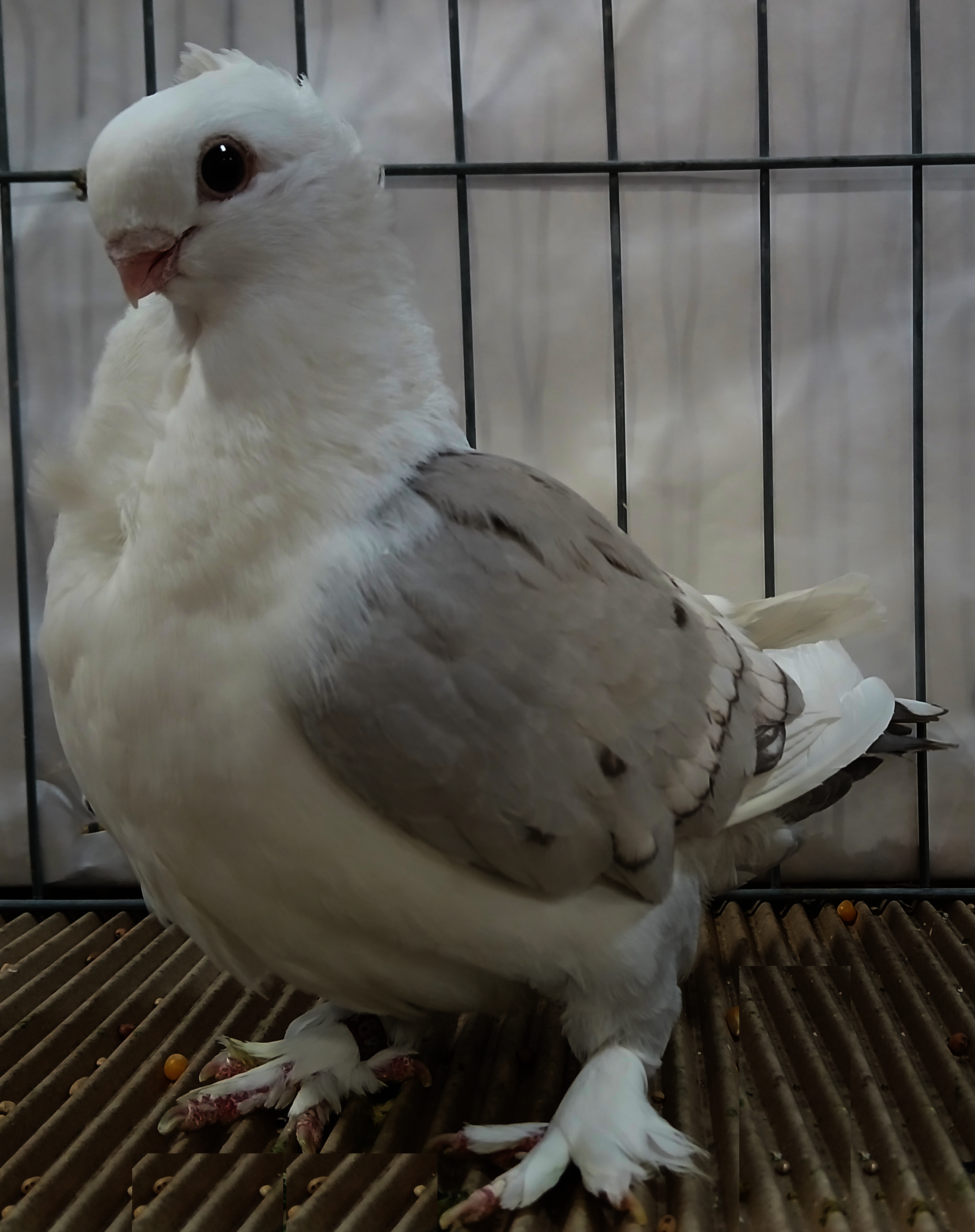
looking at you

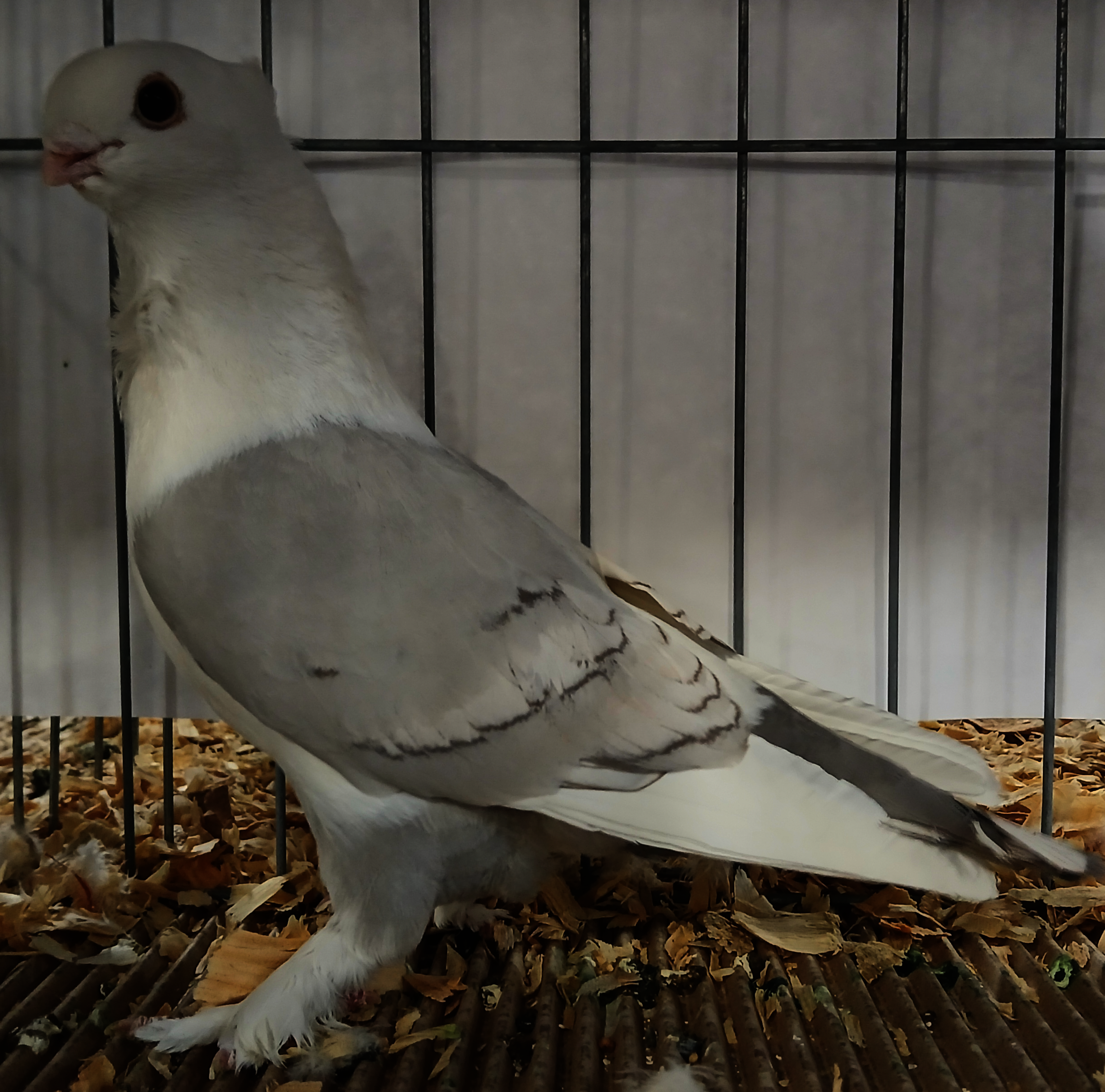
White bar

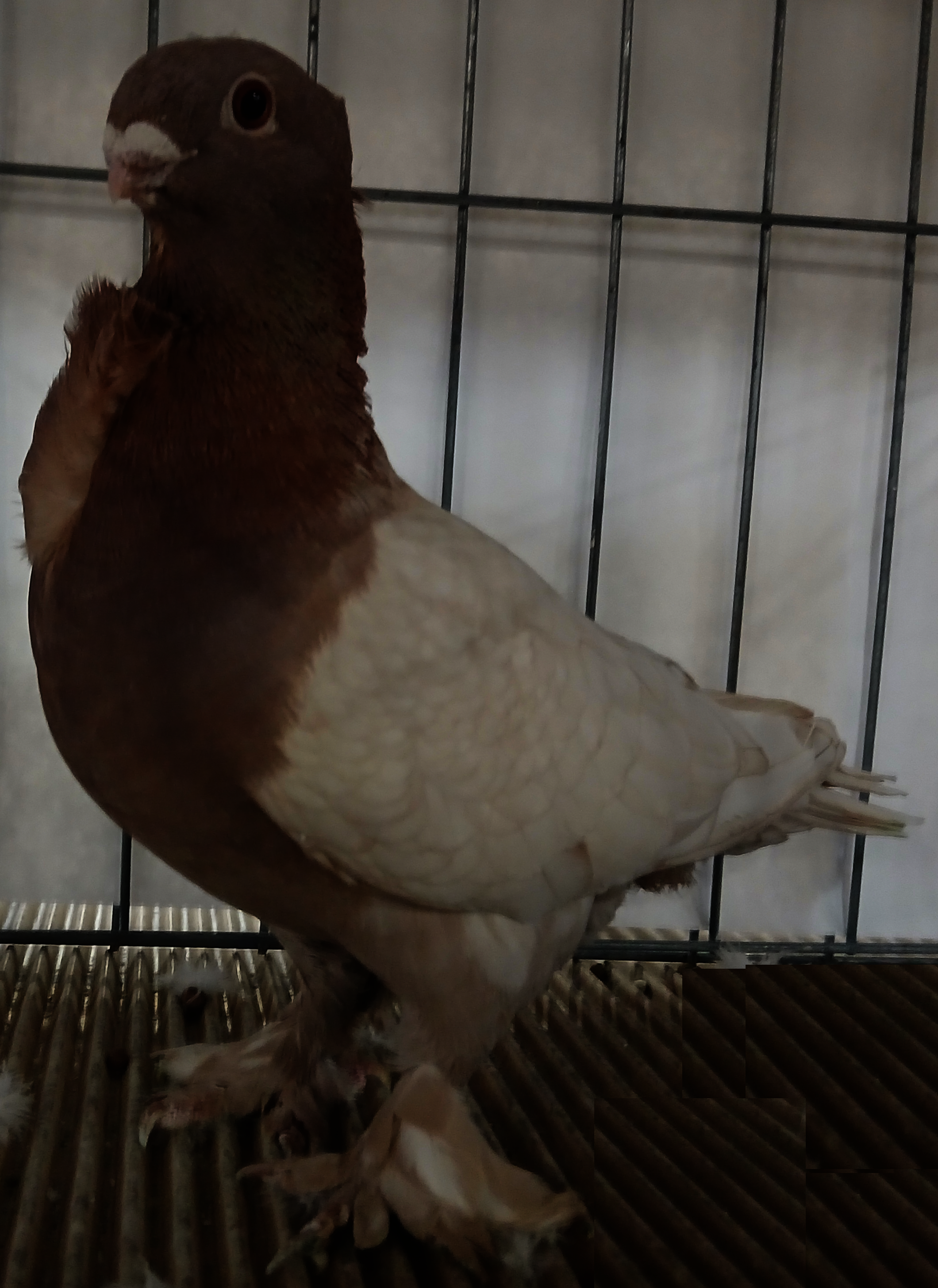
Red lace

== See also ==
- Pigeon Diet
- Pigeon Housing
- List of pigeon breeds
