= Charles Stuart Cochrane =

Scottish officer

Captain Charles Stuart Cochrane (29 October 1796 – after January 1845) was a Scottish officer in the Royal Navy, traveller and entrepreneur. The son of Admiral Alexander Cochrane and his wife Maria, Charles came from an extensive naval and army family; he was a cousin of Admiral Thomas Cochrane, 10th Earl of Dundonald, and of the explorer John Dundas Cochrane.

== Early life ==
According to a certificate signed by his mother, Maria Cochrane (née Shaw), 'my son Charles Stuart Cochrane was born on board H.M.S. Thetis at sea.' The ship was at that time cruising somewhere off the east coast of North America. Charles was probably the fourth child of that marriage, his siblings being Jane (d. 1830), Anna (d. 1873) Thomas (1789–1872) who became an Admiral in the Royal Navy, and Andrew (1799–1870) .
In the family tradition, he was sent to the Royal Naval College in Portsmouth, in July 1810, with a view to a career in the Royal Navy. In April 1812, he began his career, Volunteer, First Class on various navy ships, frequently in the same crew as some of his cousins. In September 1816 he was promoted to the rank of Lieutenant and served on ships patrolling the coasts of South America. In February 1821, he was appointed Flag-Lieutenant to his father who had just been appointed Commander-in-Chief at Portsmouth. In December 1822, he was promoted to Commander.

It was now that Charles decided to resign his commission, and do some travelling.

== Travels in South America ==
Charles Cochrane in Colombia (1824)

In 1823–1824, Charles travelled around South America. This was at a time when there were active revolutionary movement, struggling for independence from Spain. Charles had, in August 1820, already experienced some dangerous shore-life, when he and a fellow-officer were attacked by Spanish-Indian gauchos near Buenos Aires. His fellow-officer, Henry Finch, was killed, and Charles badly wounded.

His trigger for exploring South America was largely due to his interest in developing pearl fisheries, having seen these in Colombia in 1819. He was determined to invest in such fisheries and improve their operations, and, at the same time, seek out other opportunities for commercial enterprise. During the course of his travels, which lasted from March 1823 to April 1824, he visited Colombia and Venezuela, took a boat-trip up the Cienega River, observed wildlife, native peoples, mineral mines and pearl-fisheries. He eventually managed to secure 'exclusive rights in Colombia for fishing for the pearl oysters with machinery,' for the London company of Rundell, Bridge and Rundell.

After returning to London in April 1824, he wrote and published in 1825 his two-volume journal of his travels: Journal of a Residence and Travels in Colombia, during the years 1823 and 1824, by Captain Charles Stuart Cochrane of the Royal Navy. It was dedicated to 'Simon Bolivar, Liberator and President of Colombia, Dictator of Peru, Generalissimo of the Armies &c &c &c'. He mentions in the Journal that had hoped to meet Simón Bolívar, but that he had failed to do so. In the preface to this Journal, he explained that he wished to see 'a nation successful in the vindication of its rights, and triumphant over the mean and mistaken policy that would have condemned it to a perpetuity of sloth, ignorance, bigoted superstition, and slavery.' The Journal not only describes Charles's journeys, but also gives a history of the nationalist uprisings against Spain, and some notes on the commerce and industry of the region.

Just a few years earlier, in January 1818, Charles's cousin Thomas Cochrane, in disgrace and effectively sacked from the Royal Navy, had taken up the post of commander-in-chief of the Chilean navy, where he conducted successful battles against the Spanish navy. In 1823, Thomas was appointed to command the navy of Brazil, again with a view to liberating all of Brazil from Spanish rule. Charles's travels through the region were probably smoothed by his family connection.

It is likely that Charles had persuaded his cousin John Dundas Cochrane of the attractions of South America. John made two visits to Colombia – firstly in June 1824, and then, after returning briefly to London, in the following summer; in August 1825, he died of fever at Valencia in Colombia shortly after his arrival.

== Travels in Britain ==
Charles Cochrane dressed as ‘Juan de Vega’ (1830)

The pearl-fishery enterprise did not prove a personal financial success for Charles. He notes, in subsequent writing, that in July 1828, he had experienced a 'disappointment' in South America. This disappointment was probably in addition to an earlier one: 'in Columbia in 1824, where I was unfortunately engaged in one of those fashionable bubbles, by which I lost my health, and was swindled out of a thousand pounds.' Partly for this reason, he now embarked on a new adventure.

In order to raise money for anti-monarchist refugees arriving in Britain from Spain, he proposed to tour Britain. He furnished himself with a guitar and a song-book, dressed as a troubadour, and pretended to be a Spaniard by the name of Señor Juan de Vega. He was ten months on this journey, leaving London in late August 1828 and reaching Edinburgh in June 1829. His journey took in towns in Kent, along the south coast of England, Bath and Bristol, Wales, Dublin and Belfast, and Glasgow. While at Spithead, he noticed that the Russian fleet was in, so he visited one of the ships, and made the interesting statement in his journal that 'As to the vessel, I am a poor judge of ships; I have, besides, a particular dislike to the sea.' This might explain his abrupt resignation from the Royal Navy in 1822.

In the course of the journey, despite being robbed at least once, he managed to raise the sum of £58 which, as he explained in a letter to the London Times, 31 October 1829, he donated to the 'Committee of Spanish Gentlemen, for the Benefit of the recent Emigrants from Portugal'. He then set about publishing his account of these travels. This was printed in two volumes in London in 1830, as A Journal Made by Señor Juan de Vega, the Spanish Minstrel, of 1828-9 through Great Britain and Ireland. This book was satirised by Henry Mayhew in his one act play The Wandering Minstrel.

== Cashmere manufacture ==
In 1830, the 'Scottish Board of Trustees for the Encouragement of Arts and Manufactures' offered a 300 pound sterling reward to the first person who could spin cashmere in Scotland based on the French system. Charles Stuart Cochrane, now in France, managed to acquire sufficient technical information on this aspect of spinning, and in 1831 took out a patent for the process. He then sold the patent to Henry Houldsworth and Sons of Glasgow, and in 1832 Houldsworth started the manufacture of cashmere yarn, and received the Scottish Board's award in 1833.

At the same time as discovering the method for producing cashmere, Cochrane had found out how the French spun Merino yarn. This process was also brought back to Scotland and, in collaboration with Houldsworth, Merino yarn began to be produced in factories in Glasgow. The above-named 'Scottish Board of Trustees' also offered a 300-pound award, and it seems that Cochrane received this in 1834.

== Later life ==
After 1831, the life of Charles Stuart Cochrane is not well documented. He was still alive, in London, in January 1845: there is a short exchange of views in the London Times newspaper, between him and the editor (19 December 1844 and 9 January 1845), on a rather obscure argument about good manners and protocol involving himself and the British ambassador to Madrid; this had taken place during a visit by Charles to Spain, in the autumn of 1844, when, according to Charles, his earlier efforts to support the refugees had been greatly praised.

After 9 January 1845, no further trace of Charles has so far been found. He may have died abroad, perhaps in France, like several of his extended family. In the 'New Statistical Account of Scotland' published later in 1845, Cochrane is described as 'the late Captain C. S. Cochrane'; the reliability of this report is not certain.

== Confusables ==
Charles Stuart Cochrane is not to be confused (as some writers and library-catalogues do) with his cousin Charles, who was the illegitimate son of Basil Cochrane (1807–1855). The latter Charles became a noted social reformer and philanthropist in London in the 1840s and 1850s. Neither is Charles Stuart to be confused with his uncle, Charles Cochrane (1749–1781), who was killed at the Battle of Yorktown.

== In fiction ==
Charles Stuart Cochrane appears as a character in Andrew Drummond's novel, Novgorod the Great (2010).

== Editions ==
- Cochrane, Charles Stuart (1825). Journal of a Residence and Travels in Colombia, during the years 1823 and 1824, by Captain Charles Stuart Cochrane of the Royal Navy. Vols I and II. Colborn..

Both volumes are available on-line as follows:

- https://books.google.com/books?id=HLECAAAAYAAJ - Volume I, 1825 edition. (Google scan.)
- https://books.google.com/books?id=9RUeAAAAMAAJ – Volume II, 1825 edition. (Google scan.)
- https://archive.org/details/dli.bengal.10689.7228 - Volume I, 1825 edition. (MSN scan.)
- https://archive.org/details/dli.bengal.10689.7229 - Volume II, 1825 edition. (MSN scan.)
- Cochrane, Charles Stuart (1830). The journal of a tour made by Señor Juan De Vega, The Spanish Minstrel of 1828-9, Through Great Britain and Ireland, A Character Assumed by an English Gentleman. London: Simpkin and Marshall.

Both volumes are available on-line as follows:

- https://books.google.com/books?id=w40MAAAAYAAJ - Volume I, 1830 edition. (Google scan.)
- https://books.google.com/books?id=bXAsAAAAMAAJ – Volume II, 1830 edition. (Google scan.)
- https://archive.org/details/dli.bengal.10689.7386 - Volume I, 1830 edition. (MSN scan.)
- https://archive.org/details/dli.bengal.10689.7292 - Volume II, 1830 edition. (MSN scan.)

== Notes/Citations ==
Sources

- Cochrane, Alexander (1983). The Fighting Cochranes: A Scottish Clan over six hundred years of naval and military history. In collaboration with the 14th Earl of Dundonald. London: Quiller Press. ISBN 0-907621-19-8.
