= William-Louis Ternaux =

French wool manufacturer (1763–1833)

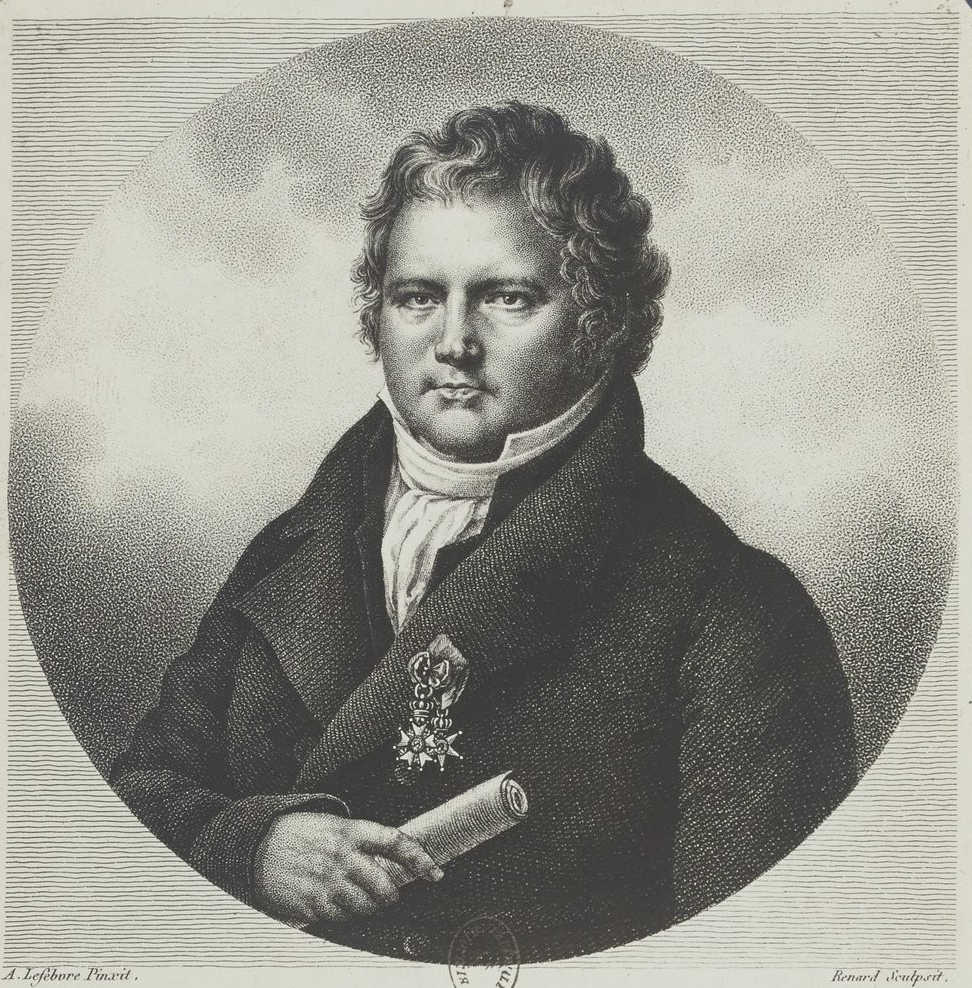
- Portrait of William-Louis Ternaux
- Born: 1763; Sedan, France
- Died: 2 April 1833 (aged 69–70); Saint-Ouen, France
- Occupations: Industrialist, manufacturer, politician
- Known for: Leading woolen industry in France
- Notable work: Expansion of woolen manufacturing, introduction of cashmere goats to France
- Awards: Legion of Honour (1810)

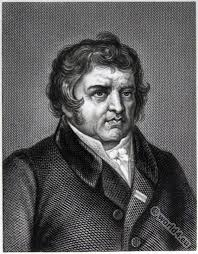
William Ternaux

William-Louis Ternaux (1763–1833) was a French industrialist and manufacturer in the wool industry. the eldest son of Charles-Louis Ternaux (1738–1814), took over the direction of his family’s small woolen cloth business at Sedan (Department of Ardennes) in 1781 and rose to become the leading woolens manufacturer in France under Napoleon and during the Restoration.

At the height of his success and fame in 1823, he challenged anyone to provide evidence to the contrary. If anyone, he wrote, could prove “... the existence of a manufacturer, not only in France, but in Europe, who has, at the same time, manufactured a greater amount and a greater value of woolen stuffs, created more new stuffs, experimented more with the use of raw materials and with the texture of fabrics, added more to the value of common woolen cloths, than I have done in the course of my life, I stand ready to pay this researcher the sum of 100,000 francs for his efforts.”

Ternaux was one of the notable ‘lanceurs d’affaires’ of the early Industrial Revolution in France. During 1781-1789 he very capably expanded the family woolens business at Sedan from 8 to 150 looms, giving work to over 3,000 men, women and children.

The politics of the Revolution interrupted his achievement and led to his exile from France during 1792-98, but he used these years to advantage by studying the woolens industry in England, Germany and Switzerland. He formulated an ambitious business plan for when he would return to France.

By the time of the "Exposition of the Products of French Industry" in Paris in 1823, when he composed his challenge cited above, he had created and was orchestrating a giant mechanized woolens industry employing overall some 20,000 people. Every requirement, from the raising of sheep to the marketing of finished products, was provided for and integrated.

His main factories (usines de fabrication) at Sedan, Reims, Louviers and Verviers (Belgium) employed a total of about 800 looms. His factory at Bazancourt, near Reims, was the first in France (1811) where wool was combed and spun by machine. He had experimental model factories for new fabrics (ateliers d’essais) at his summer estate at Saint-Ouen, near Paris. In Paris, there were workshops on the rue Mouffetard for constructing and testing new textiles machines and a chain of ten retail shops for displaying his wares, the most important of which was the Cachemire Français at No.3 Place des Victoires.

His main offices and private bank were at the same address. He built a dyeworks at Ternes and a Spanish-style wool washing plant at Auteuil. He had commerce houses in cities throughout Europe as well as in New York, Mexico, Valparaiso and Calcutta. His ship, named 'Ternaux’, carried his goods to ports around the world. Ternaux contributed significantly to the introduction and perfection of merino sheep from Spain and, most famously, in 1818-19 he brought Tibetan cashmere goats to France and experimented with their fine down for his famous luxury shawls (cachemires, also named 'Ternauxs'). His private herd of about 150 goats at Saint-Ouen supplied the fine wool for his factories at Reims that specialized in high quality fabrics -- "étoffes de goût et de fantasie en laine." Napoleon, on the occasion of a visit to Louviers in June, 1810, awarded Ternaux the cross of the Legion of Honor.

In private societies and the councils of Napoleon, as well as in the legislative assemblies of the Restoration, Ternaux was a key spokesman for economic and educational policies for the advancement of French industry. He was a principal founder of the Society for the Encouragement of National Industry (1801) and the first manufacturer appointed to the Ministry of Interior’s advisory Conseil Général des Fabriques et Manufactures (1810). He was a respected member of the important Chamber of Commerce of Paris. In the Chamber of Deputies of the Restoration (1818-1824, 1827-1831), Ternaux spoke out in favor of “liberal” measures for the freedom of commerce and industry. He advocated government support for expanding French overseas markets, especially in South America. He opposed strongly the policies of the Comte de Saint-Cricq (Director General of Customs) establishing high tariffs for the protection of French industry and agriculture. Ternaux's speech ("In the name of industry. . .") in the Chamber of Deputies at the time of the 1829 depression in France was a biting, summary attack on Restoration economic policies. Ternaux was a close friend of Jean Baptiste Say, the French proponent of laissez faire economics, and he supported Henri Saint-Simon’s concept of an industrial-scientific society headed by the captains of industry.

Ternaux’s contributions over 50 years to the advancement of the woolens industry in France were truly remarkable. By the late 1820s, however, he was in trouble financially and forced to withdraw gradually from the field. He found it increasingly difficult to compete with less expensive English woolens, and there was growing consumer demand by then for cheaper machine-made cotton goods. In addition, he was having growing problems acquiring fine wools for the production of his luxury goods.

His efforts to increase and improve French sheep herds had only limited success, and agricultural interests in France had succeeded in having a high tariff placed on imports of foreign wools. Ternaux decided to shift his energies and available investment capital to the manufacture of linens and canvas. He researched the cultivation of flax in France and experimented at Saint-Ouen with machines for the manufacture of linens.

Finally, in 1829, he organized a partnership to raise over 2 million francs for the construction of a large, up-to-date linens and canvas factory at the small village of Boubers-sur-Canche, near Arras (Department of Pas-de-Calais). Unfortunately, just as the Boubers factory was about to begin production, the Revolution of July 1830 in France scared off his investors. The fate of the Boubers venture was still in question when Ternaux died accidentally (2 April 1833) at his home in Saint-Ouen.

William Ternaux’s impressive woolens empire did not endure after his sudden and tragic death. His only brother, Etienne-Nicolas, who contributed importantly to the success of ‘Ternaux frères’ from 1795 to 1816, died in 1830. Etienne had liquidated his business relationship with his brother earlier in 1816. In 1816, Ternaux's two sons, Charles-Louis (1791-1835) and Édouard-Louis (1792-1836), were given shares in the business at Louviers and Reims, but were unwilling to carry on in the family enterprise after their father's death.

They refused their inheritance which was encumbered with debts. Charles, in 1826, was a partner in a commercial bank in Paris, named Charles Ternaux, J. Gandolphe & Company, No.2 rue des Fossés-Montmartre. Édouard had been a partner with his father's associates at Reims, Jobert-Lucas & Company. This company was dissolved in 1829. Ternaux was unmarried in 1833. He divorced his first wife, Françoise Lecomte, in 1795; a second marriage in 1800, to Sabine de Gonzenbach, was annulled in 1811.

== Family Names ==
- Charles-Louis Ternaux (1738-1814), father
- Marie-Marguerite Malon, mother
- Françoise Lecomte, wife (divorced 1795)
- Sabine de Gonzenbach, wife (m. 1800; annulled 1811)
- Étienne-Nicolas-Louis Ternaux (1765-1830), brother
- Marie-Louise Ternaux (b.1767), sister
- Marie-Hélène Ternaux (b.1769), sister
- Marie-Louise-Rosalie Ternaux (b.1770), sister
- Marie-Louise-Victoire Ternaux (b.1772), sister
- Charles-Louis Ternaux (1791-1835), son
- Édouard-Louis Ternaux (1792-1836), son
