= Cashmere wool =

Fiber obtained from cashmere goats and other types of goat

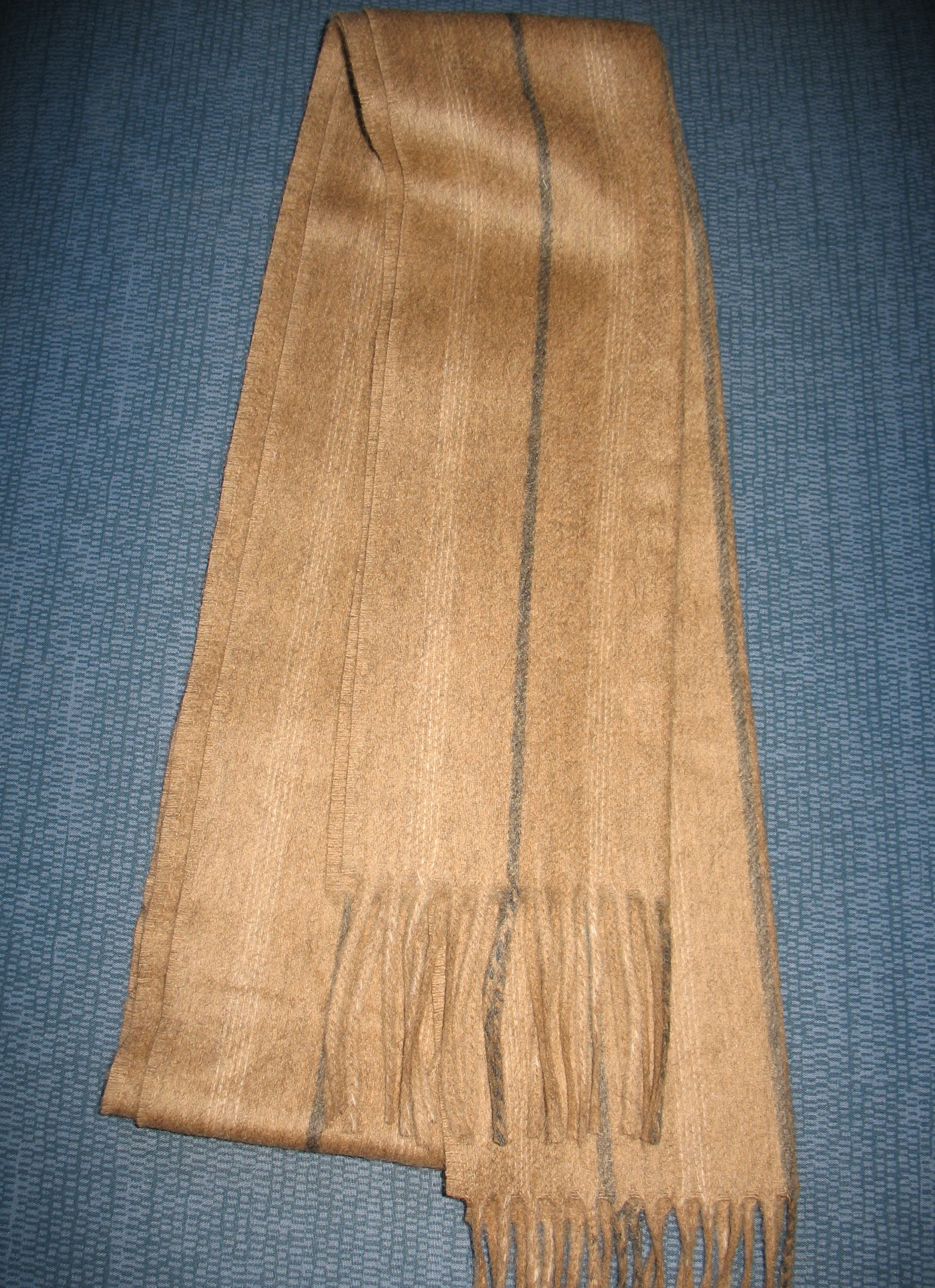
Cashmere scarves

Cashmere wool, usually simply known as cashmere, is a fiber obtained from cashmere goats, pashmina goats, and some other breeds of goat. It has been used to make yarn, textiles and clothing for hundreds of years. Cashmere is closely associated with the Kashmir shawl, the word "cashmere" deriving from an anglicization of Kashmir, when the Kashmir shawl reached Europe in the 19th century. Both the soft undercoat and the guard hairs may be used; the softer hair is reserved for textiles, while the coarse guard hair is used for brushes and other non-apparel purposes. Cashmere is a hygroscopic fiber, absorbing and releasing water from the air based on the surrounding environment. This helps regulate the body in both warm and cool temperatures.

A number of countries produce cashmere and have improved processing techniques over the years, but China and Mongolia are two of the leading producers as of 2019. Afghanistan is ranked third.

Some yarns and clothing marketed as containing cashmere have been found to contain little to no cashmere fiber, so more stringent testing has been requested to ensure items are fairly represented. Poor land management and overgrazing to increase production of the valuable fiber has resulted in the decimation and transformation of grasslands into deserts in Asia, increasing local temperatures and causing air pollution which has traveled as far as Canada and the United States.

== Sources ==
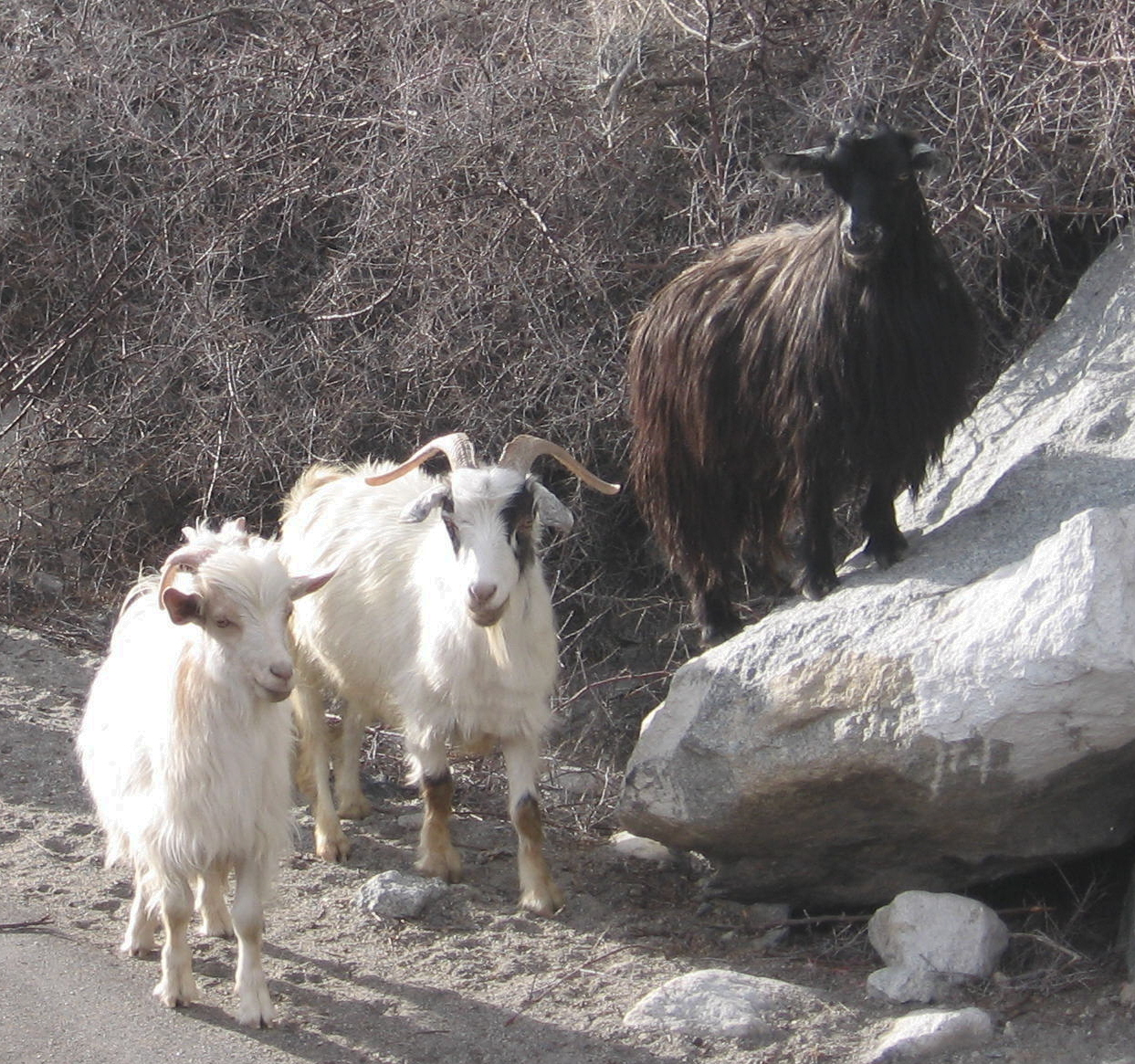
Pashmina goats, Ladakh, India

Historically, in the Western scientific community, fine-haired Cashmere goats have been called Capra hircus, as if they were a subspecies of the domestic goat Capra hircus. However, they are now more commonly considered part of the domestic goat subspecies Capra aegagrus hircus or the alternate version Hircus Blythi Goat. Cashmere goats produce a double fleece that consists of a fine, soft undercoat or underdown of hair mingled with a straighter and much coarser outer coating of hair called guard hair. This undercoat is grown in the winter as a way to keep the goat warm in colder months. For the fine underdown to be sold and processed further, it must be de-haired. De-hairing is a mechanical process that separates the coarse hairs from the fine hair. After de-hairing, the resulting cashmere is ready to be dyed and converted into textile yarn, fabrics and garments. De-hairing is made slightly easier by removing the undercoat by hand, rather than shaving the entire coat. This process takes much longer to remove the cashmere, but produces a much finer, higher quality fiber.

== Gathering ==
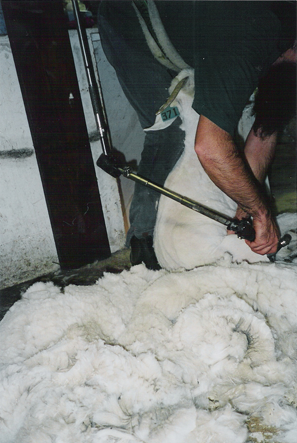
Cashmere shearing. Corindhap, Australia.

Cashmere wool is collected during the spring moulting season when the goats naturally shed their winter coat. In the Northern Hemisphere, the goats moult as early as March and as late as May.

In some regions, the mixed mass of down and coarse hair is removed by hand with a coarse comb that pulls tufts of fiber from the animal as the comb is raked through the fleece. Fiber collected by this method has a higher yield of pure cashmere, after it has been washed and dehaired, than does fiber produced by shearing. The long, coarse guard hair is then typically clipped from the animal and is often used for brushes, interfacings and other non-apparel uses. Animals in Iran, Afghanistan, New Zealand, and Australia are typically shorn of their fleece, resulting in a higher coarse hair content and lower pure cashmere yield. In the United States, the most popular method is combing. The process takes up to two weeks, but with a trained eye for when the fiber is releasing, it is possible to comb the fibers out in about a week. The term "baby cashmere" is used for fibers harvested from younger goats, and is reputed to be softer.

== Production ==
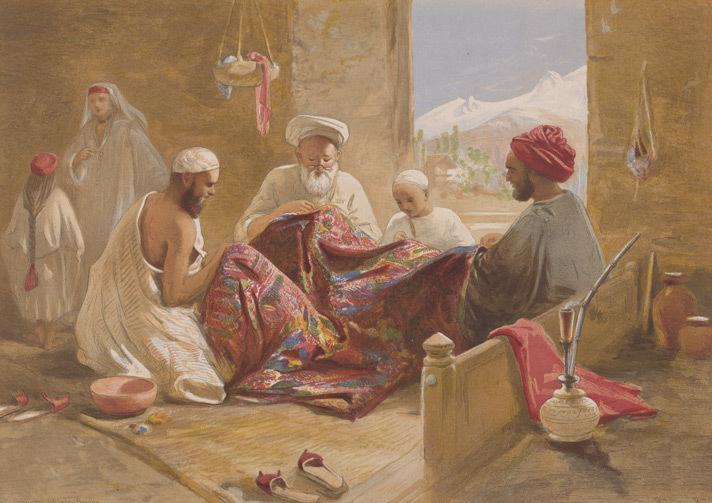
An 1867 William Simpson painting depicting men manufacturing shawls using pashm wool

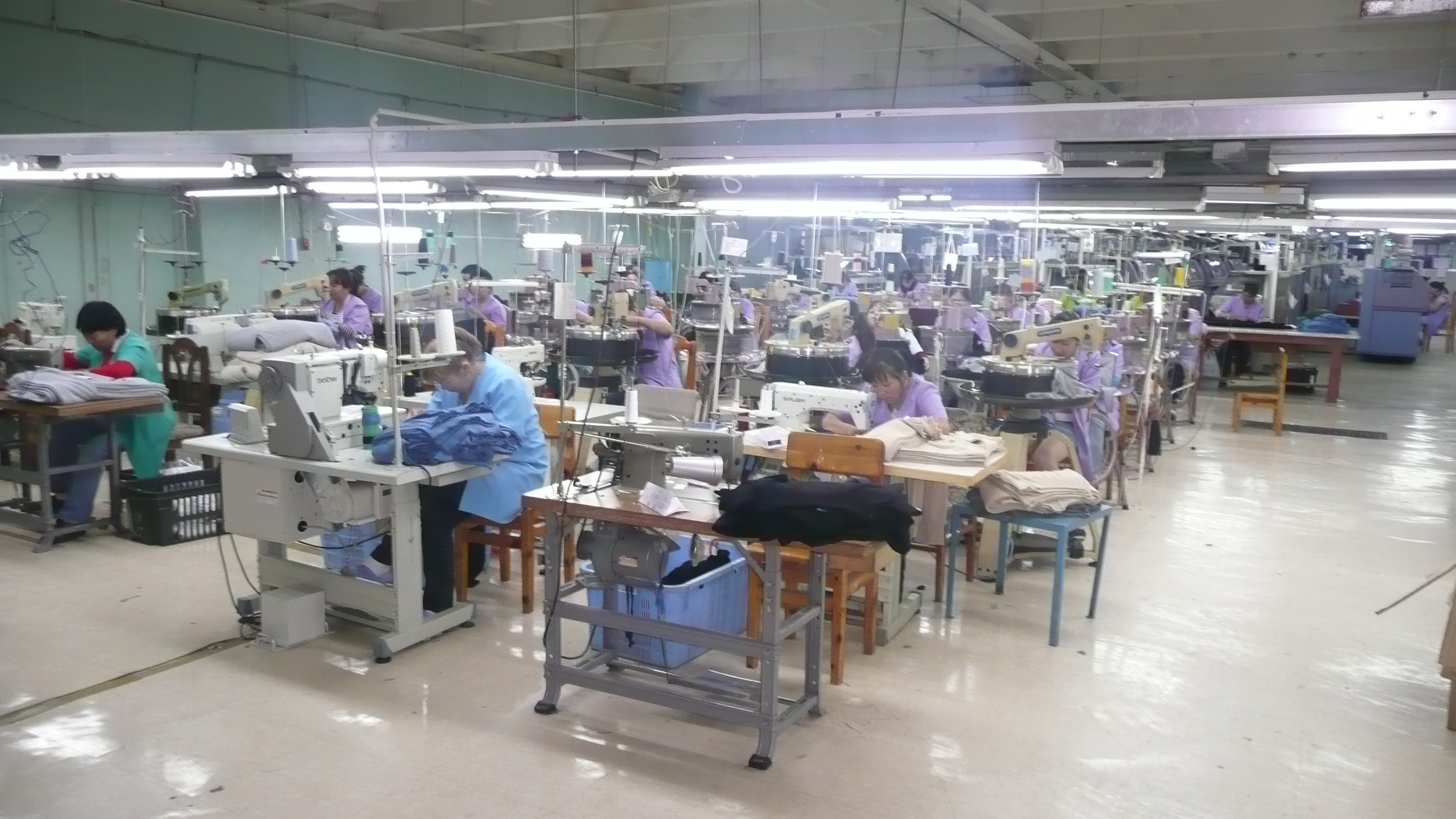
Cashmere factory in Ulaanbaatar

China is the largest producer of raw cashmere, with production estimated to be 19,200 metric tons (in hair) per year in 2016. Mongolia is second with 8,900 tons (in hair) as of 2016, while Afghanistan, Iran, Turkey, Kyrgyzstan and other Central Asian republics produce lesser amounts. The annual world raw production is estimated to be between 15,000 and 20,000 tons (13,605 and 18,140 tonnes) (in hair). Pure cashmere, after removing animal grease, dirt and coarse hairs from the fleece, is estimated at 6,500 tons (5,895 tonnes). Ultra-fine Cashmere or Pashmina is still produced by communities in Kashmir but its rarity and high price, along with political instability in the region, make it very hard to source and to regulate quality. It is estimated that the average yearly production per goat is 150 grams (0.33 lb).

Pure cashmere can be dyed and spun into yarns and knitted into jumpers (sweaters), hats, gloves, socks and other clothing, or woven into fabrics and then cut and assembled into garments such as outer coats, jackets, trousers (pants), pajamas, scarves, blankets, and other items. Fabric and garment producers in Scotland, Italy, and Japan have long been known as market leaders. Cashmere may also be blended with other fibers to bring the garment cost down, or to gain their properties, such as elasticity from wool, or sheen from silk.

The town of Uxbridge, Massachusetts, in the United States was an incubator for the cashmere wool industry. It had the first power looms for woolens and the first manufacture of "satinets". Capron Mill had the first power looms, in 1820. It burned on July 21, 2007, in the Bernat Mill fire.

In the United States, under the U.S. Wool Products Labeling Act of 1939, as amended, (15 U. S. Code Section 68b(a)(6)), a wool or textile product may be labelled as containing cashmere only if the following criteria are met:

- such wool product is the fine (dehaired) undercoat fibers produced by a cashmere goat (Capra hircus laniger);
- the average diameter of the fiber of such wool product does not exceed 19 microns; and
- such wool product does not contain more than 3 percent (by weight) of cashmere fibers with average diameters that exceed 30 microns.
- the average fiber diameter may be subject to a coefficient of variation around the mean that shall not exceed 24 percent.

== Types of fiber ==
- Raw – fiber that has not been processed and is essentially straight from the animal
- Processed – fiber that has been through the processes of de-hairing, washing, carding, and is ready either to spin or to knit/crochet/weave
- Virgin – new fiber made into yarns, fabrics or garments for the first time
- Recycled – fibers reclaimed from scraps or fabrics that were previously woven or felted and may or may not have been previously used by the consumer from various parts of the world.

== History ==
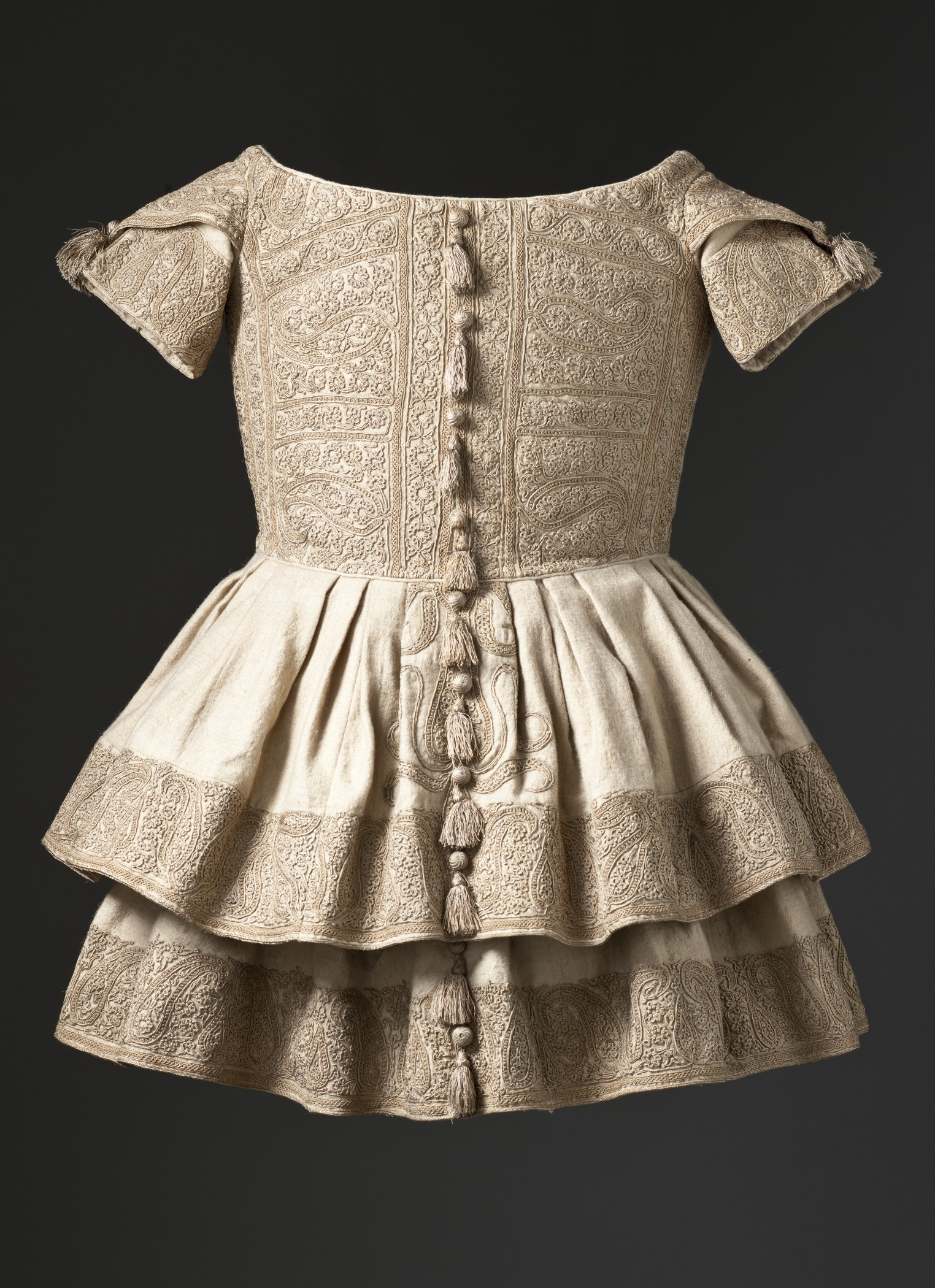
A boy's frock produced c. 1855 in Kashmir; cashmere wool twill with silk embroidery and silk tassels.

Cashmere has been manufactured in Mongolia, Nepal and Kashmir for thousands of years. The fiber is also known as pashm (Persian for wool) or pashmina (Persian/Urdu word derived from Pashm) for its use in the handmade shawls of Kashmir. References to woolen shawls appear in texts surviving from between the 3rd century BC and the 11th century AD. However, a popular notion in Kashmir is that it was the 15th-century ruler of Kashmir, Zain-ul-Abidin, who founded the local wool industry by bringing weavers from Turkestan. Another local tradition sees the founder of all Kashmiri crafts in the famous 14th century saint Mir Sayyid Ali Hamadani who, tradition goes, brought 700 craftsmen from Persia to Kashmir. When Ali Hamadani visited Ladakh he discovered for the first time in history the warmth and fineness of Ladakh goat wool. He combed some goat wool and made a pair of socks with his own hands. Afterwards he gave those socks to the king of Kashmir, Sultan Qutubdin (1374-89 AD). Sultan was amazed by their durability and fineness. Ali Hamadani brought some raw goat wool from Ladakh and suggested the king to start shawl weaving in Kashmir. That was the starting point of the usage of the cashmere wool.

Trading in commercial quantities of raw cashmere between Asia and Europe began with Valerie Audresset SA, Louviers, France, claiming to be the first European company to commercially spin cashmere. The down was imported from Tibet through Kazan, the capital of the Russian province of Volga, and was used in France to create imitation woven shawls. Unlike the Kashmir shawls, the French shawls had a different pattern on each side. The imported cashmere was spread out on large sieves and beaten with sticks to open the fibers and clear away the dirt. After opening, the cashmere was washed and children removed the coarse hair. The down was then carded and combed using the same methods used for worsted spinning.

In the 18th and early 19th centuries, Kashmir (then called cashmere by the British) had a thriving industry producing shawls from goat down imported from Tibet and Tartary through Ladakh. The down trade was controlled by treaties signed as a result of previous wars The Shawls were introduced into western Europe when General Napoleon Bonaparte sent one to Paris from his campaign in Ottoman Egypt. The shawl's arrival is said to have created an immediate sensation and plans were put in place to start manufacturing the product in France.

In 1799 at his factory in Reims, William-Louis Ternaux, the leading woolens manufacturer in France under Napoleon, began to produce imitation India shawls (cachemires) using the wool of Spanish merino sheep. By 1811, with government assistance, Ternaux also began experimenting with the production of real India shawls using what he called laine de Perse, i.e., the down (duvet) of Tibetan-cashmere goats. In 1818, Ternaux resolved to help establish herds of cashmere goats in France. A famous expedition to Persia was organized, led by the orientalist and diplomat Pierre Amédée Jaubert, to be financed in part by the French government. Of the acquired herd of 1,500 animals, only 256 arrived safely in the spring of 1819 at Marseilles and Toulon via the Crimea. About 100 of the cashmere goats were then purchased by the French government (at 2,000 francs each) and sent to the royal sheep farm at Perpignan. The remainder, about 180 including new-borns, went to Ternaux's property at Saint-Ouen outside Paris. Although Ternaux had little success getting small farmers to add cashmeres to their sheep herds, a few wealthy landowners were willing to experiment with the goats. For example, Ternaux's herd was seen in 1823 by C.T.Tower of Weald Hall, Essex, England. Tower purchased two female and two male goats and took them back to England, wherein 1828 he was awarded a gold medal by the Society for the Encouragement of Arts, Manufactures and Commerce for rearing a herd of cashmeres. Also, a few of Ternaux's goats were purchased for a model farm at Grignon, near Versailles, run by M. Polonceau. Polonceau crossbred the cashmeres with Angora goats to improve the down for spinning and weaving. This Cashmere-Angora herd was seen by William Riley of New South Wales in 1828, and again in 1831 when Riley purchased thirteen of the goats for trans-shipment to Australia. At the time, the average production of the Polonceau herd was 16 ounces (500 grams) of down. Ternaux's herd at St. Ouen still numbered 150 when the famous industrialist died in 1833. The herd at Perpignan died out by 1829.

By 1830, weaving cashmere shawls with French-produced yarn had become an important Scottish industry. The Scottish Board of Trustees for the Encouragement of Arts and Manufactures offered a 300 pound sterling reward to the first person who could spin cashmere in Scotland based on the French system. Captain Charles Stuart Cochrane collected the required information while in Paris and received a Scottish patent for the process in 1831. In the autumn of 1831, he sold the patent to Henry Houldsworth and sons of Glasgow. In 1832 Henry Houldsworth and sons commenced the manufacture of yarn, and in 1833 received the reward.

Johnstons of Elgin started working with cashmere in 1851, having sourced the raw fibre from Edward Buxton, a wool merchant in London. They immediately trialled spinning the fibre and by 1852 Johnstons had successfully woven it into tweed cloth for a Mr Murgahtroyd. By the following year they were supplying cashmere tweeds to Scott & Wright of London, and the production of cashmere shawls was soon to follow. It is also rumoured that they developed their own dehairing machine, likely at their on-site iron foundry in Elgin.

Dawson International claim to have invented the first commercial dehairing machine in 1890, and from 1906 they purchased cashmere from China, but were restricted to purchasing fiber from Beijing and Tianjin until 1978. In 1978 trade was liberalised and Dawson International began buying cashmere from many provinces.

Many early textile centers developed as part of the American Industrial Revolution. Among them, the Blackstone Valley became a major contributor to the American Industrial Revolution. The town of Uxbridge, Massachusetts, became an early textile center in the Blackstone Valley which was known for the manufacture of cashmere wool and satinets.

Austrian Textile Manufacturer Bernhard Altmann is credited with bringing cashmere to the United States of America on a mass scale beginning in 1947.

Attempts to improve Afghanistan's cashmere industry by importing Italian goats in the 2010s have been criticized as wasteful.

== Criticism of industry ==
The production of cashmere wool has been criticized for the detrimental environmental effects directly resulting from raising the herds. The high demand for cashmere is causing grasslands in China and Mongolia to disappear, air pollution to increase and the herds to starve. Factories in Alashan are forced to close several days a week due to water rationing as the deserts there expand by 400 square miles per year. As of 2016, the degradation of 65% of the grasslands in the area has been linked to a four-degree Fahrenheit increase in the temperature of Mongolia, three degrees higher than temperatures in other areas of the world. With proper management, the grasslands could recover in the space of ten years. Mitigation efforts include changing trades, grazing bans, hand-feeding the goats, and attempting to convince Mongolian herders to raise yaks or camels instead of or in addition to fewer goats, as the hair from these animals is also valuable and their impact on grasslands is less.

Air pollution, caused by the combination of industrial heavy burning of coal creating atmospheric particulates, and the desert dust storms resulting from disappearing grasslands in China and Mongolia, crosses the Pacific Ocean to the Americas. Health officials in Canada, China, Mongolia and the US have had to issue air quality warnings to the public.

The demand for the fiber has caused some vendors, both knowingly and not, to sell yarns or textiles containing little to no cashmere representing themselves as being composed of cashmere. Wool and other fibers have been mixed in by unscrupulous manufacturers, deliberately selling mislabeled items to well-known department stores. Complaints of mislabeling after testing for cashmere content were reported by the Cashmere and Camel Hair Manufacturers Institute to the Federal Trade Commission, leading to more stringent examination of cashmere products.

As part of achieving Cradle to Cradle "gold" certification for its clothing, in January 2023, fashion brand Ralph Lauren announced it would provide shipping labels to return cashmere clothes of any brand to be recycled by Re-Verso in Tuscany.

== See also ==
- Pashmina
- Shahtoosh
- International Year of Natural Fibres
- Environmental impact of fashion
