= Christianity and Classical Culture =

Book by Charles Norris Cochrane

- Title page for Christianity and Classical Culture: A Study of Thought and Action from Augustus to Augustine (1944 edition)
- Author: Charles Norris Cochrane
- Language: English
- Subject: classical antiquity
- Publisher: Oxford University Press
- Publication date: 1940

Christianity and Classical Culture: A Study of Thought and Action from Augustus to Augustine is a 1940 book by Charles Norris Cochrane examining how the culture of ancient Rome was changed by its encounter with Christianity in the period leading up to Augustine. It was published initially by Oxford University Press and subsequently republished by Liberty Fund. Among the best-known admirers of and advocates for this book was W.H. Auden, who wrote: "Since the appearance of the first edition in 1940, I have read this book many times, and my conviction of its importance to the understanding not only of the epoch with which it is concerned, but also of our own, has increased with each rereading". It was also much admired by Harold Innis, who described it as "the first major Canadian contribution to the intellectual history of the West".

== See also ==
- W.H. Auden
- Harold Innis
