= Oriental Frill =

Breed of pigeon

Oriental Frill/Blondinette
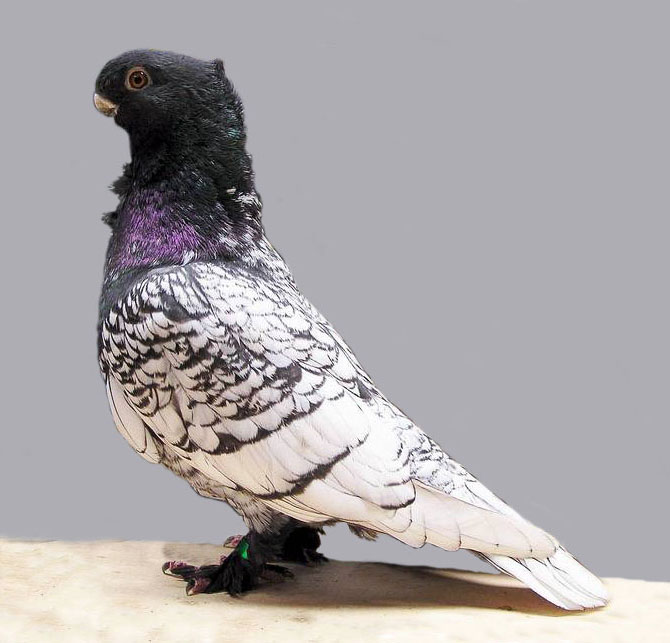
- Oriental Frill (Blondinette)
- Conservation status: Common
- Country of origin: Turkey

Classification
- Australian Breed Group: Group 3
- US Breed Group: Fancy
- EE Breed Group: Frill and Owl Pigeons

The Oriental Frill is a breed of fancy pigeon developed over many years of selective breeding. It is originally a Turkish pigeon breed specially bred for the Ottoman Sultans in the Manisa Palace, Turkey. Manisa is an old Ottoman city in western Turkey. It is called Hünkari: the bird of the Sultans in its homeland. The variety is divided into several variations in color and markings with Blondinettes and Satinettes being the most common.

It has been a popular breed in the United States and has had two issues of the American Pigeon Journal devoted to the breed. (August 1961 April 1969). The original form is still being preserved as the Old Fashioned Oriental Frill.

== Gallery ==
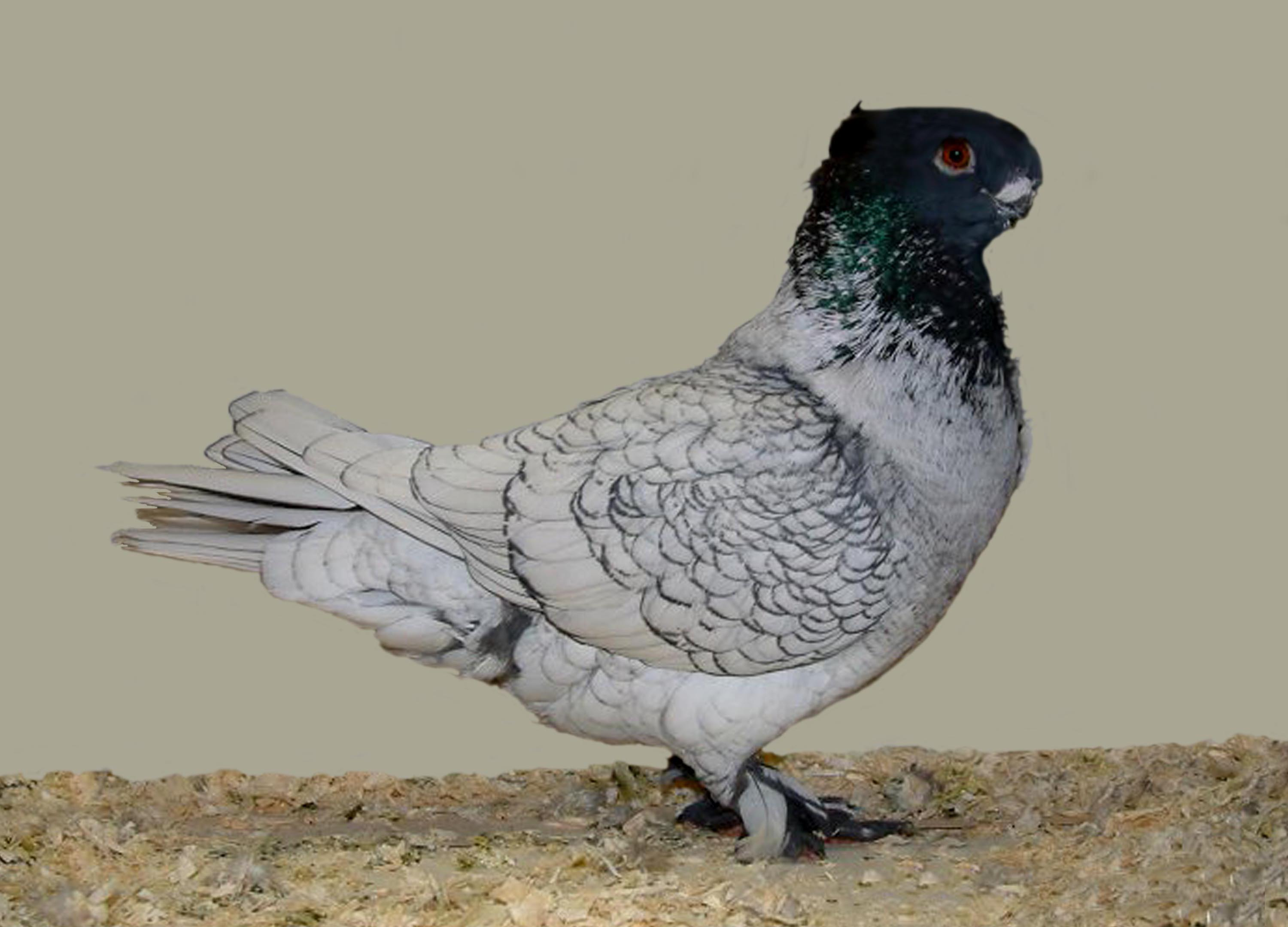
Blondinette

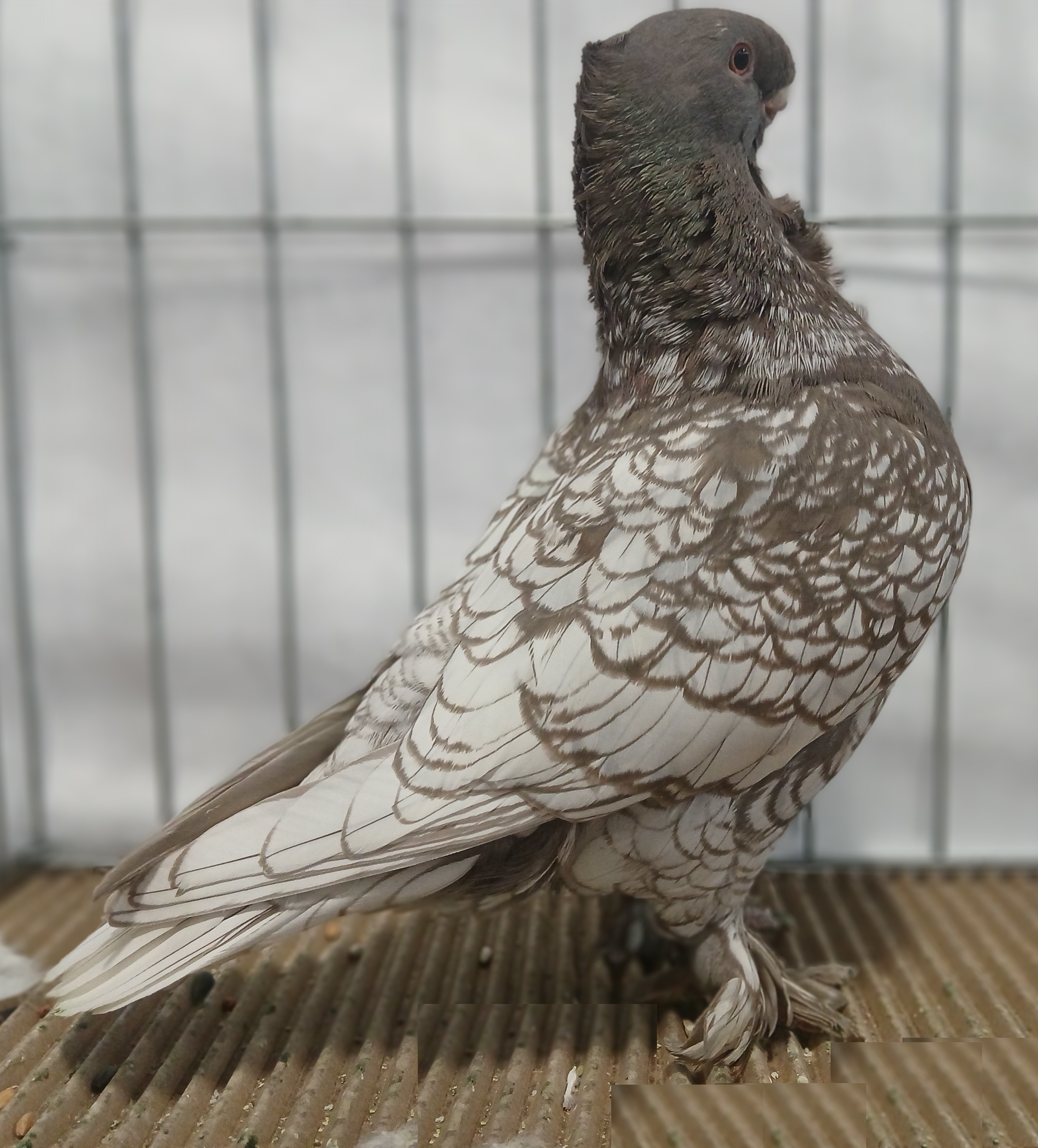
Blondinette

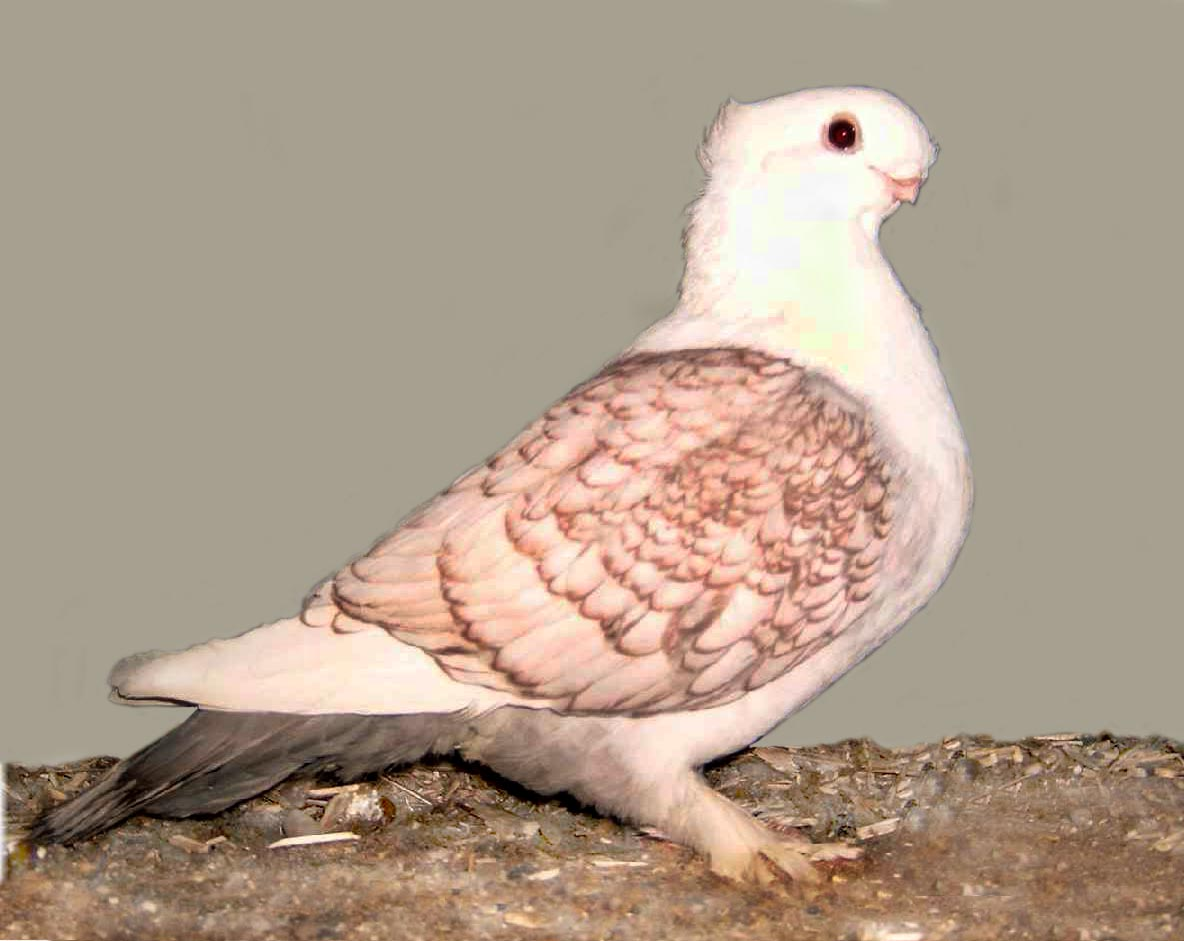
Satinette

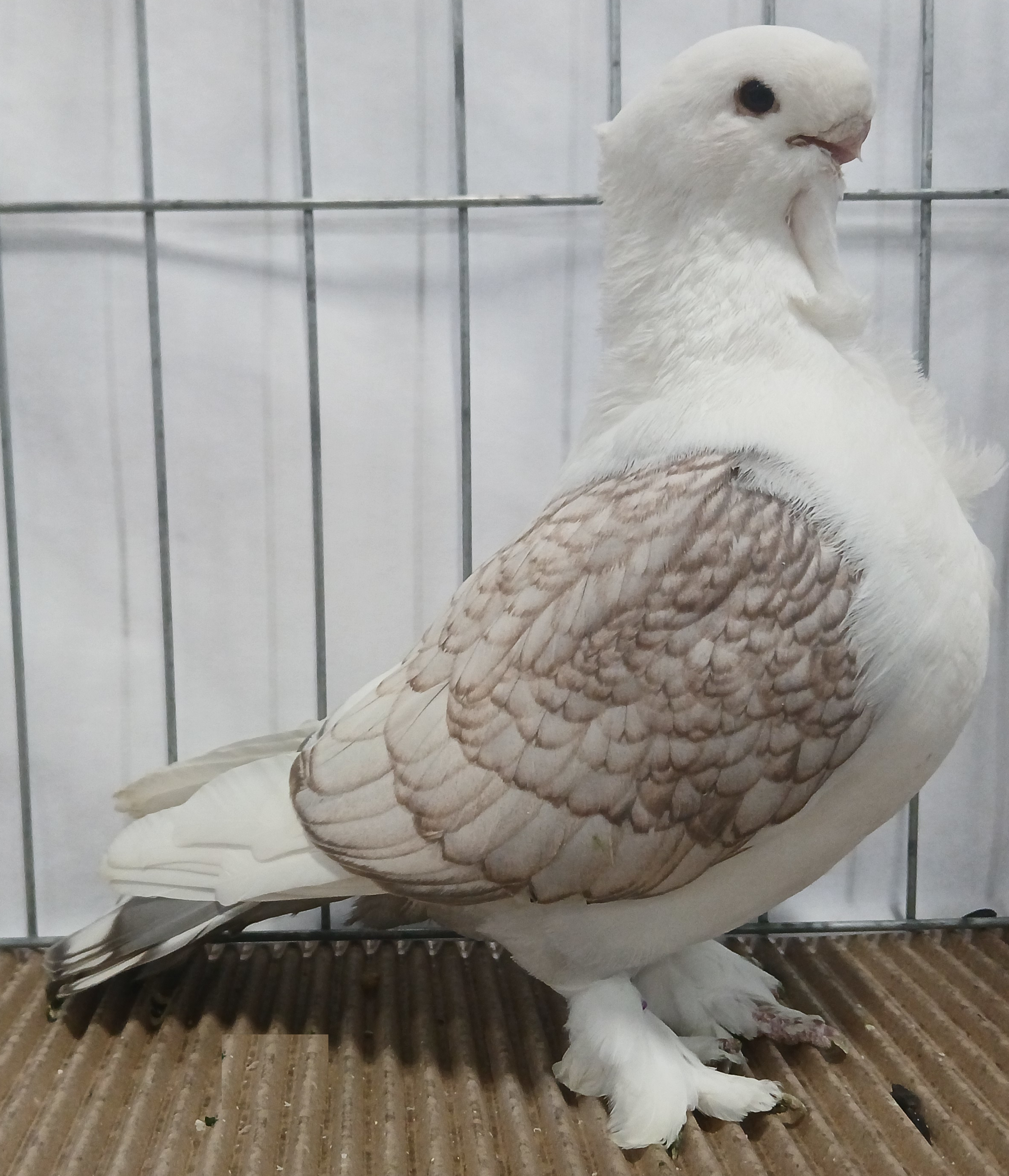
Satinette

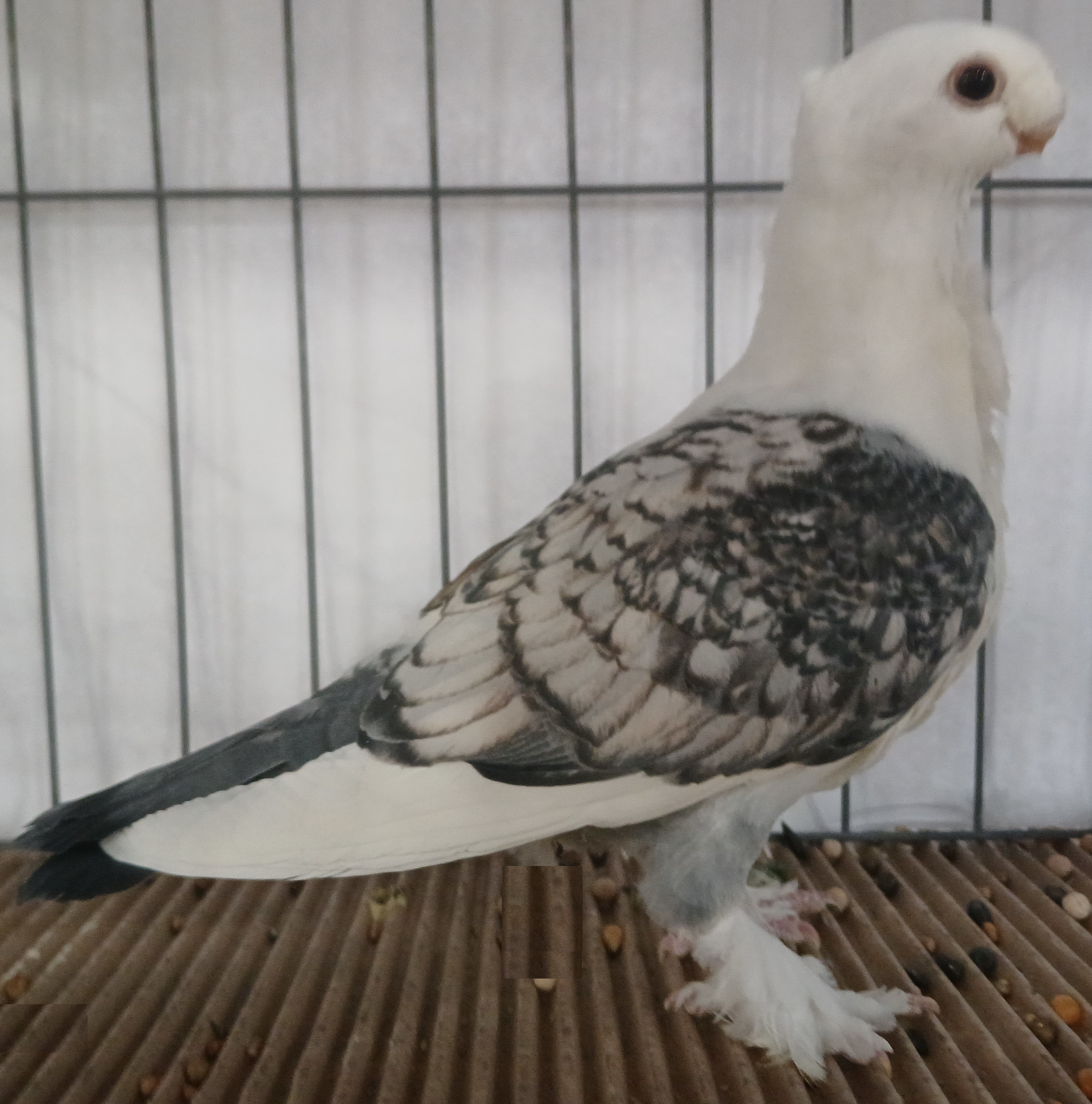
Satinette

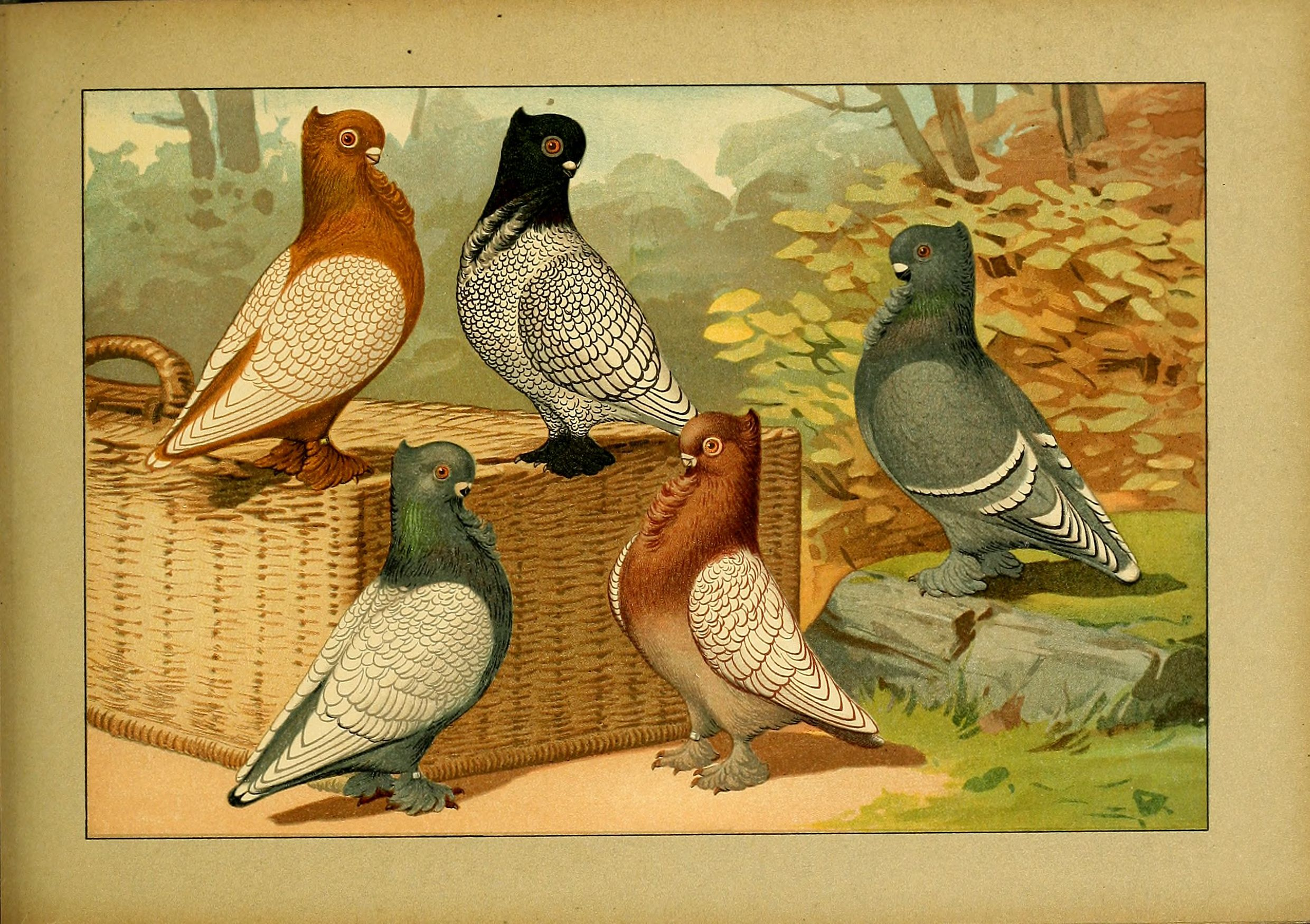
Schachtzabel 1906 Tafel 72

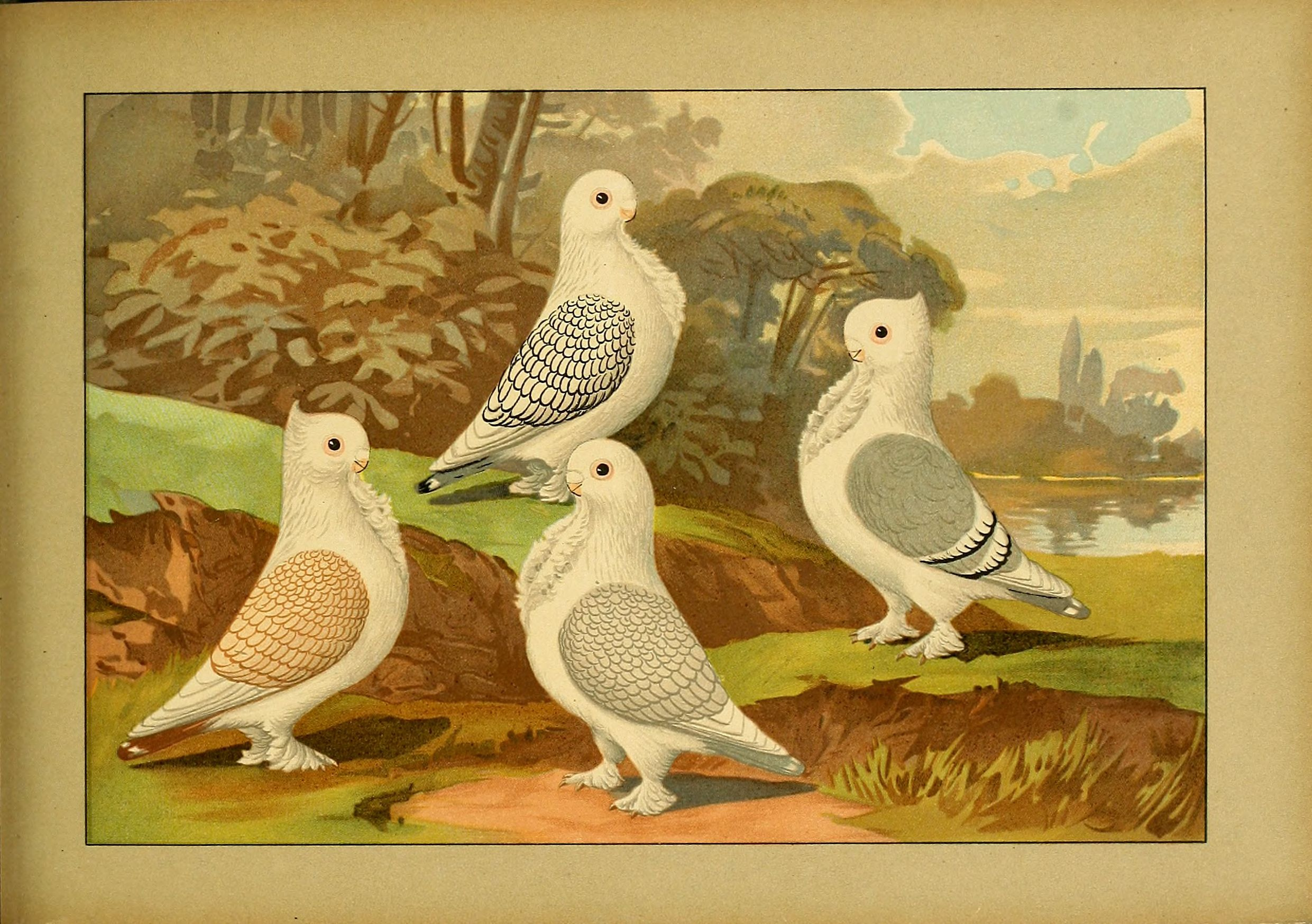
Schachtzabel 1906 Tafel 73

== See also ==
- List of pigeon breeds
- Pigeon keeping
  - Pigeon Diet
  - Pigeon Housing
