= Satinet =

Finely woven fabric resembling satin, made from cotton or synthetic fibers

Satinet is a finely woven fabric with a finish resembling satin, but made partly or wholly from cotton or synthetic fiber. The fibers may be natural (as with cotton, woolens or cashmere wool) or synthetic.

== In the United States of America ==
The process of manufacturing satinets in the United States of America began c. 1820 at the Capron Mill in Uxbridge, Massachusetts.

The Hockanum Mill in Rockville / Vernon CT was originally constructed in 1814 by Bingham & Nash. They became a leading manufacturer of satinet. The Hockum Mills in Connecticut was formed in 1836 and constructed a larger mill to produce satinet, a finely woven fabric that resembles satin but is made from wool. They continued to produce satinet until 1869. Satinet was also an important commodity for the people of West Tisbury, on the island of Martha's Vineyard in Massachusetts. The Old Mill Pond property in that town was purchased by David Look in 1809 and he converted what was once a grain mill to a textile mill. He installed a carding machine to produce woolen yarn and looms for weaving that wool into fabrics called kersey and satinet. Needing more power than the river itself could provide, Look installed a dam to raise the pond's water level. His mill produced satinet, a waterproof fabric used in whaling and sea-going outerwear. Thomas Bradley bought the property in 1845 and erected a new textile mill which prospered until the 1860s, largely due to the popularity of satinet's use in waterproofing Civil War military uniforms. That mill building, now headquarters for the Martha's Vineyard Garden Club, still stands today.

== See also ==
- Sateen – another satin-like weave
