= Charles Norris Cochrane =

Canadian historian and philosopher (1889–1945)

Charles Norris Cochrane (August 21, 1889 – November 23, 1945) was a Canadian historian and philosopher who taught at the University of Toronto. He is known for his writings about the interaction between ancient Rome and emerging Christianity.

== Early life and education ==
Cochrane was born in Omemee, Ontario. He attended the University of Toronto, graduating with a degree in Classics in 1911. He then attended the University of Oxford.

== Career ==
During the First World War, Cochrane was active in the Canadian Officers Training Corps and in 1918 went overseas with the 1st Tank Battalion.

After the war, in 1919, Cochrane joined the Faculty of Ancient History at the University of Toronto.

His David Thompson the Explorer appeared in 1924, his Thucydides and the Science of History in 1929, and his best-known work, Christianity and Classical Culture, in 1940. The last of these was praised by W. H. Auden, and it was described by Harold Innis as "the first major Canadian contribution to the intellectual history of the West". In it Cochrane investigated the political and cultural interaction between the Romans and Christians in the early days of Christianity.

In 2017, a new collection of Cochrane's posthumously published writings and collected essays appeared, Augustine and the Problem of Power: The Essays and Lectures of Charles Norris Cochrane. The title essay in this volume was originally delivered as the 1945 Nathaniel W. Taylor Lectures at the Yale University Divinity School. Cochrane expressed the opinion that the philosophy of Augustine largely replaced classical Greek philosophy as the dominant intellectual world view.

In his philosophy and historiography, Cochrane was influenced by R. G. Collingwood. The Hegelian philosopher James Doull was among his students. Doull's friend George Grant was also a very great admirer of Cochrane. Political scientist Arthur Kroker, pointing to Cochrane's writings about the conflict between Christianity and nihilism, and his insight into the "generative origins of Christianity as a response to a larger cultural crisis that secular thought, whether Roman or Greek, could not solve for itself," deemed Cochrane "one of the leading 20th-century philosophers of civilization."

He became a Fellow of the Royal Society of Canada in 1941.

He died on November 13, 1945 in Toronto.
