= Charles Cochrane (social reformer) =

British social reformer

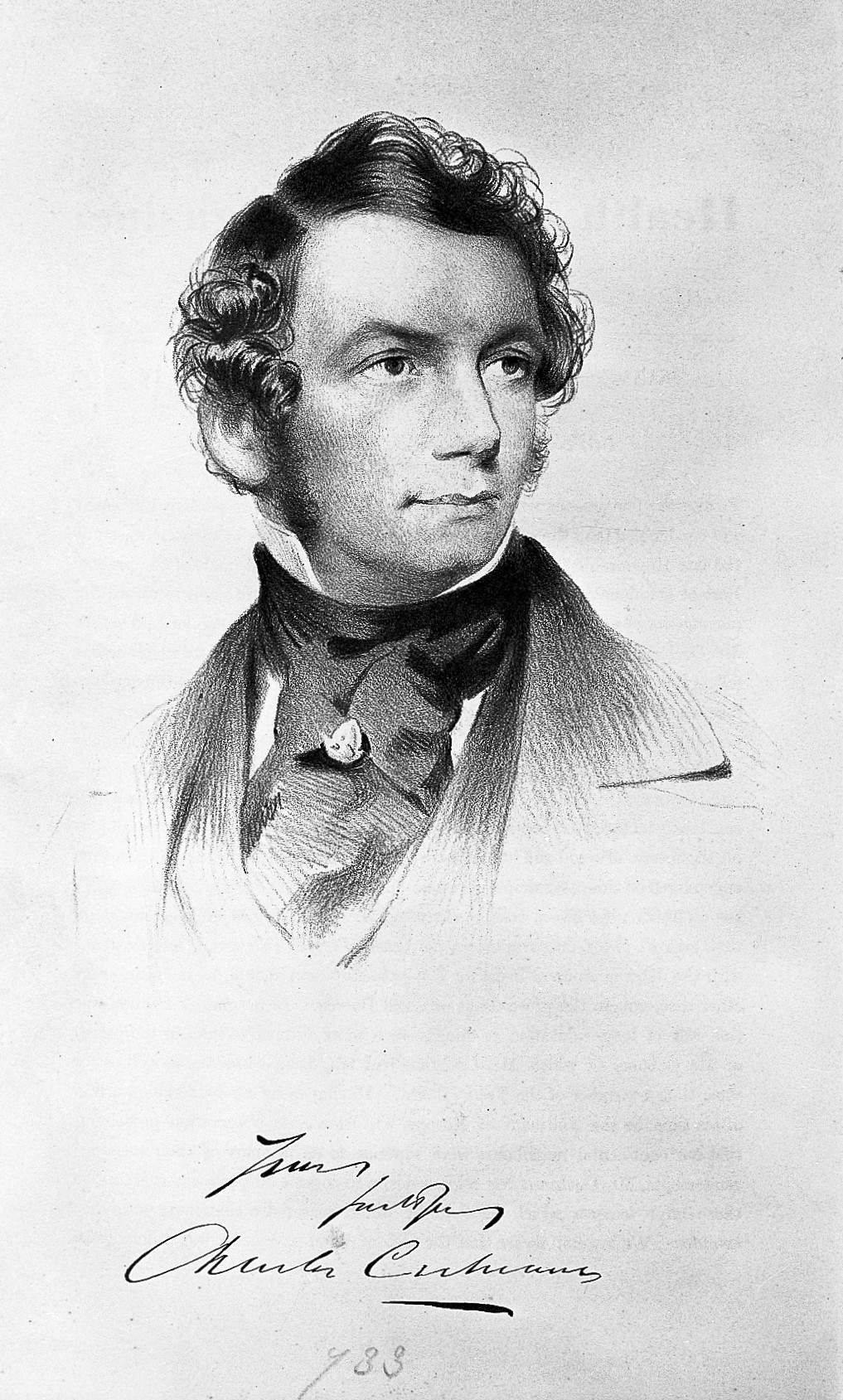
Charles Cochrane, ca.1847

Charles Cochrane (1807-1855) was a Scottish campaigner for the poor in London in the 'hungry 40s' and, in the last years of his life, campaigner against Sunday trading. Cochrane was born in Madras, the son of Basil Cochrane who himself was the sixth son of Scottish nobleman and politician Thomas Cochrane, 8th Earl of Dundonald.

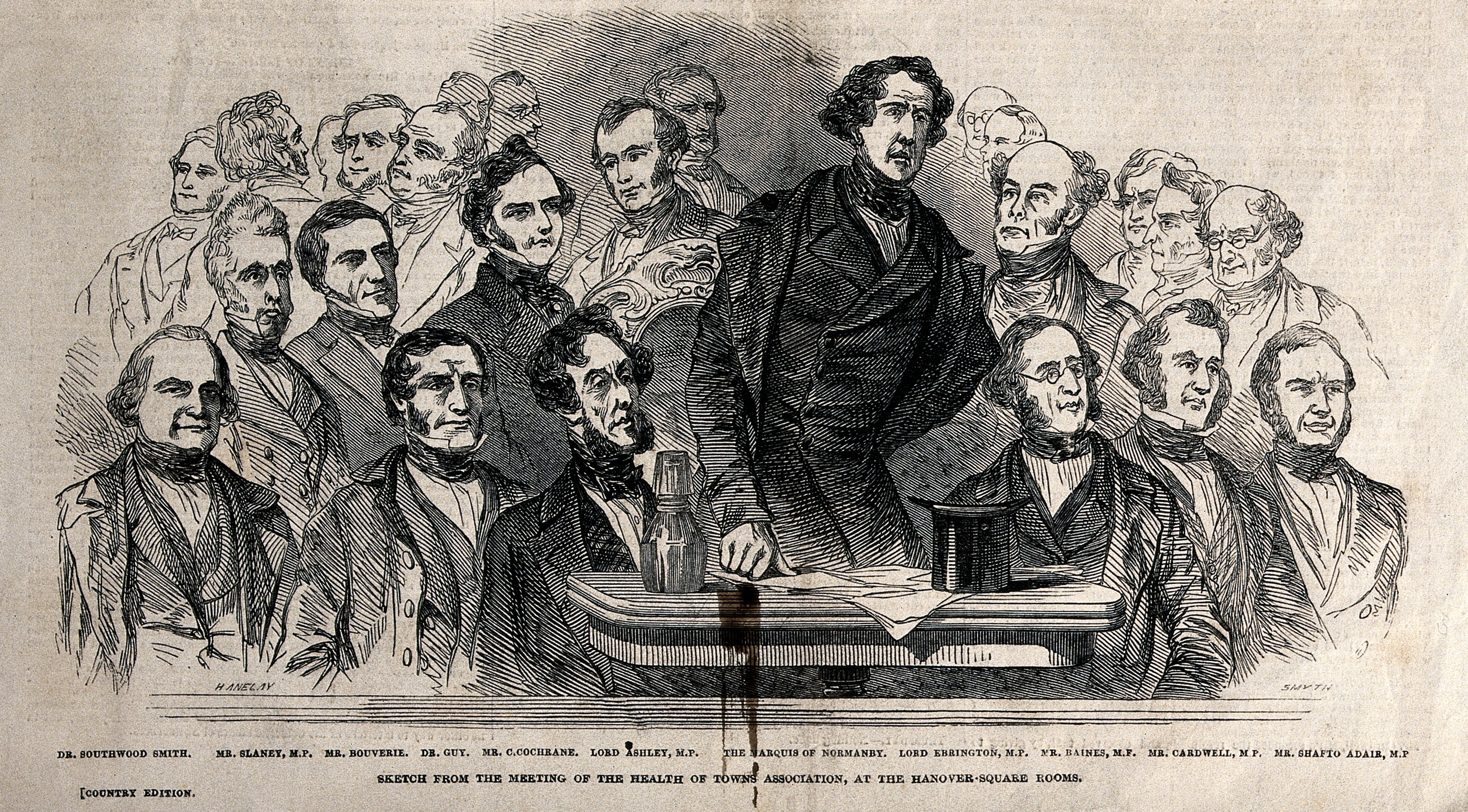
Charles Cochrane at the Health of Towns Association Meeting, 1847

After the introduction of the harsh poor laws of the 1830s Cochrane became increasingly concerned with responding in a practical way to poverty, deprivation and hunger in London. In 1842 he founded and became President of the National Philanthropic Association and in 1846 he founded the Poor Man's Guardian Society, 'instituted for the purpose of aiding the destitute in their approach for parochial relief, and for securing them the legal and humane dispensation of the Poor-law.' The society attempted to get the support of Charles Dickens who was cautious in his response but did pay them a subscription of five guineas. The organisation described Charles Dickens as a vice-president. Cochrane became an increasingly prominent figure in London circles with his campaigns for the poor, advocating radical improvements in sanitation and public health.

By 1848 the NPA had introduced a system of paid street cleaners to West Central London

There may be some doubt as to his date and place of death. 1855 is generally stated for the date (see for example the National Portrait Gallery ). However, a report of debtors' court proceedings in London, in December 1856, states that he had died in 1853. This might have been a misprint for 1855. Another report from 1857, on the same affair of debts incurred on the building occupied by the Samaritan Institution,notes that 'the debt for the building was incurred by Mr. Charles Cochrane, who, being unable to pay it, left the country'; and then describes him as 'the late Mr. Cochrane'. So he may have died abroad, perhaps in France where several of his extended family also died while evading creditors.
