= List of shipwrecks in 1804 =

The list of shipwrecks in 1804 includes ships sunk, foundered, wrecked, grounded, or otherwise lost during 1804.

table of contents
1804
Jan	Feb	Mar	Apr
May	Jun	Jul	Aug
Sep	Oct	Nov	Dec
Unknown date

== January ==
=== 1 January ===
List of shipwrecks: January 1804
Ship	State	Description
HMS Hound	Royal Navy	The gun-brig ran aground on the Goodwin Sands, Kent. She was refloated.
Phoenix	United Kingdom	The ship was lost near Orfordness, Suffolk. Her seventeen crew were rescued. She was on a voyage from South Shields, County Durham to London.

=== 2 January ===
List of shipwrecks: January 1804
Ship	State	Description
Commerce	United States	The ship was driven ashore on Goree, Zeeland, Batavian Republic.
Eagle	United States	The ship was driven ashore on Goree.

=== 3 January ===
List of shipwrecks: 3 January 1804
Ship	State	Description
Caroline Frederica	Stettin	The ship was wrecked at Bullers of Buchan, Aberdeenshire, United Kingdom. Her crew were rescued. She was on a voyage from Stettin to London, United Kingdom.
HMS Conflict	United Kingdom	The gun-brig ran aground in The Downs. She was refloated and taken in to Ramsgate, Kent.
HMS Creole	Royal Navy	The frigate foundered in the Atlantic Ocean (40°42′N 51°24′W). Her crew were rescued by HMS Cumberland (Royal Navy).
Unnamed	Sweden	The ship was driven ashore and wrecked at Rattray Head, Aberdeenshire.

=== 4 January ===
List of shipwrecks: 4 January 1804
Ship	State	Description
Ann	United Kingdom	The ship was wrecked near Port Jolly, Nova Scotia, British North America while on a voyage from London to Halifax, Nova scotia.
Copelin	United Kingdom	The ship was wrecked near Cork.
Mary	United Kingdom	The ship was wrecked near Cork. All on board were rescued. She was on a voyage from Bristol, Gloucestershire to Charleston, South Carolina, United States.
HMS Raven	Royal Navy	The Aréthuse-class corvette ran aground at Mazari, Sicily, and was a total loss. She was abandoned on 6 January. Her crew were rescued by Dolphin (United Kingdom).
Vigilante	Prussia	The ship was driven ashore on the coast of Holland. She was on a voyage from Emden, Duchy of Schleswig to Livorno, Grand Duchy of Tuscany.
Wembury	United Kingdom	The ship was damaged by fire at Plymouth, Devon. She was repaired and returned to service.

=== 5 January ===
List of shipwrecks: 5 January 1804
Ship	State	Description
Francis Nixon	United States	The ship was run down and sunk in the English Channel 5 leagues (13 nmi; 24 km) off Portland, Dorset, United Kingdom by HMS Santa Margarita (Royal Navy). Francis Nixon was on a voyage from Amsterdam, North Holland, Batavian Republic to New York.
Prince of Wales	United Kingdom	The ship was run down by another vessel and sank in the English Channel off Portsmouth, Hampshire. Her crew were rescued.
Robert and Ann	United Kingdom	The ship was wrecked on the Cockle Sand, in the North Sea off Great Yarmouth, Norfolk. Her crew were rescued. She was on a voyage from Sunderland, County Durham to London.

=== 8 January ===
List of shipwrecks: 8 January 1804
Ship	State	Description
Padstow	United Kingdom	The ship was driven ashore. She was on a voyage from Falmouth, Cornwall to London. She was refloated and put in to St. Mawes, Cornwall.

=== 9 January ===
List of shipwrecks: 9 January 1804
Ship	State	Description
Bountiful	United Kingdom	The ship was wrecked on the Spanish Battery Rocks, South Shields, County Durham. All on board were rescued. She was on a voyage from London to Newcastle upon Tyne, Northumberland.
Cecilia	United Kingdom	The ship was wrecked at Madeira with the loss of two of her crew. She was on a voyage from London to Bengal, India.
Hope	United Kingdom	The brig was driven ashore and wrecked at Newcastle upon Tyne, Northumberland. Her crew were rescued. She was on a voyage from Newhaven, Sussex to Sunderland.
Margaret	United Kingdom	The schooner was wrecked on the Spanish Battery Rocks. Her crew were rescued. She was on a voyage from Dundee, Perthshire to Wisbech, Cambridgeshire.
Mercury	United Kingdom	The ship was driven ashore on Madeira, Portugal. She was on a voyage from Jamaica to London.
Thomas	United Kingdom	The ship was lost whilst on a voyage from Saint Croix to New Orleans.
Unnamed	United Kingdom	The sloop was driven ashore and wrecked at Plymouth Hoe, Devon with the loss of all hands. She was on a voyage from Plymouth to Guernsey, Channel Islands.

=== 11 January ===
List of shipwrecks: 11 January 1804
Ship	State	Description
Aid	United Kingdom	The ship was driven ashore at Wicklow Head with the loss of five lives. She was on a voyage from Livorno to Bristol, Gloucestershire and Dublin.

=== 12 January ===
List of shipwrecks: 12 January 1804
Ship	State	Description
Neptune	United Kingdom	The sloop was driven ashore at Bridlington, Yorkshire. Her crew were rescued by a coble. She was on a voyage from Whitby, Yorkshire to London. She was later refloated and taken in to Bridlington.
Thalia	United Kingdom	The ship was driven ashore near Flamborough Head. She was on a voyage from London to Newcastle upon Tyne, Northumberland.

=== 14 January ===
List of shipwrecks: 14 January 1804
Ship	State	Description
Maine	United States	The ship was driven ashore at Liverpool, Lancashire, United Kingdom. She was on a voyage from Portland, Maine to Liverpool.
New York	United States	The ship was driven ashore at Liverpool. She was on a voyage from New Orleans, Spanish Louisiana to Liverpool.

=== 16 January ===
List of shipwrecks: 16 January 1804
Ship	State	Description
Harriet	United Kingdom	The ship departed from Newfoundland, British North America for Newcastle upon Tyne, Northumberland. No further trace, presumed foundered with the loss of all hands.
Elizabeth	United Kingdom	The ship was driven ashore between Wexford and Dublin.

=== 17 January ===
List of shipwrecks: 17 January 1804
Ship	State	Description
Hazard	United Kingdom	The ship was wrecked near Cádiz, Spain. Her crew were rescued. She was on a voyage from Portsmouth, Hampshire to Cádiz.
Unnamed	France	War of the Third Coalition: The fishing boat was captured by HMS Archer (Royal Navy) and was scuttled.

=== 18 January ===
List of shipwrecks: 18 January 1804
Ship	State	Description
Harriet	United Kingdom	The ship was wrecked on Sable Island, Nova Scotia, British North America. Her crew were rescued. She was on a voyage from Halifax, Nova Scotia to Newcastle upon Tyne, Northumberland.
Waldo	United Kingdom	The ship was driven ashore in the Saltee Islands.

=== 19 January ===
List of shipwrecks: 19 January 1804
Ship	State	Description
Adams	United States	The ship was wrecked at sea. She was on a voyage from Boston, Massachusetts to Rotterdam, South Holland, Batavian Republic. She put in to Gloucester, Massachusetts in a severely damaged condition.
Bewick	United Kingdom	The ship was driven ashore at Flushing, Cornwall. She was on a voyage from London to Lisbon, Portugal.
British Tar	United Kingdom	The ship was driven ashore in the Cattewater and was wrecked.
Eclipse	United Kingdom	The brig was driven ashore and wrecked at Trefusis Point, Cornwall. She was on a voyage from St. John's, Antigua to London.
HMS Fearless	Royal Navy	The gun brig was driven ashore and wrecked in Stokes Bay, Devon. All 32 people on board were rescued.
John	United Kingdom	The full-rigged ship was driven ashore and wrecked at St. Mawes, Cornwall. Her crew were rescued.
Jong Backe	Batavian Republic	The galiot was driven ashore and wrecked in the Cattewater.
Lady Arabella	United Kingdom	The packet ship was driven ashore and wrecked at Flushing, Cornwall.
L'Effronteur	France	The privateer sank in the Cattewater.
Pamphlet	United Kingdom	The sloop was driven ashore and wrecked in Deadman's Bay, Devon with the loss of a crew member.
Pendower	United Kingdom	The brig was wrecked in Mount's Bay. Her crew were rescued. She was on a voyage from London to Penzance, Cornwall.
Sally	United Kingdom	The brig was driven ashore and wrecked at St. Mawes. Her crew were rescued. She was on a voyage from Liverpool, Lancashire to Lisbon, Portugal.
St. Albans	United Kingdom	The ship ran aground at the Landguard Fort, Felixtowe, Suffolk. She was refloated.
Vautout	France	The lugger foundered in the Cattewater.
Unnamed	United Kingdom	The lighter was driven ashore and wrecked in Stokes Bay.
Unnamed	United Kingdom	The brig was driven ashore and wrecked near "Wimbury", Devon with the loss of all hands.
Two unnamed vessels	United Kingdom	The fishing smacks were driven ashore in the Cattewater. One of them sank.
Three unnamed vessels	United Kingdom	The sloops sank in the Humber.

=== 20 January ===
List of shipwrecks: 20 January 1804
Ship	State	Description
Ann	United Kingdom	War of the Third Coalition: The ship was captured by the privateer Sorcier (France) whilst on a voyage from London to Malta. She was taken in to Tarifa, Spain, where her cargo was sold. Ann was sunk on 26 January by HMS Maidstone (Royal Navy).
Fly	United Kingdom	The ship foundered in the North Sea off the mouth of the Humber. Her crew were rescued.

=== 21 January ===
List of shipwrecks: 21 January 1804
Ship	State	Description
Jane	United Kingdom	The brig was driven ashore in Stoke Bay, Devon with the loss of all hands. She was on a voyage from Plymouth, Devon to Liverpool, Lancashire
Orion	United States	The ship departed from Virginia for Antwerp, Deux-Nèthes, France. No further trace, presumed foundered in the Atlantic Ocean with the loss of all hands.

=== 22 January ===
List of shipwrecks: 22 January 1804
Ship	State	Description
Sovereign	United Kingdom	The Guineaman struck the Smith's Rock, in the Irish Sea off Ballycotton, County Cork and foundered with the loss of 31 of the 40 people on board. Only eight of 37 people on board were saved. She was on a voyage from Trinidad to Tortola and London.

=== 23 January ===
List of shipwrecks: 23 January 1804
Ship	State	Description
Fox	United States	The ship was driven ashore near Boulogne, Pas-de-Calais, France. She was on a voyage from Boston, Massachusetts to Amsterdam, North Holland, Batavian Republic.

=== 24 January ===
List of shipwrecks: 24 January 1804
Ship	State	Description
Active	United Kingdom	The ship was driven ashore and wrecked at Brodick, Arran. She was on a voyage from Tobago to Glasgow, Renfrewshire.
Industry	United Kingdom	The ship was driven onto the Saltscar Rocks, in the North Sea off Redcar, Yorkshire and was wrecked.

=== 25 January ===
List of shipwrecks: 25 January 1804
Ship	State	Description
Carolina	United Kingdom	The ship was wrecked on the coast of Ireland.
Providence	United Kingdom	The ship was driven ashore and wrecked at Redcar, Yorkshire with the loss of two of her crew.
Vine	United Kingdom	The ship was driven ashore near Redcar.

=== 27 January ===
List of shipwrecks: 27 January 1804
Ship	State	Description
ship-Unnamed	United Kingdom	The sloop sank at Brough, Yorkshire. She was on a voyage from Gainsborough Lincolnshire to Hull, Yorkshire. She was refloated and found to be severely damaged.

=== 28 January ===
List of shipwrecks: 28 January 1804
Ship	State	Description
Fanny	United Kingdom	The ship struck a rock and sank at Waterford.

=== Unknown date ===
List of shipwrecks: Unknown date in January 1804
Ship	State	Description
Active	United Kingdom	The ship was driven ashore and wrecked near South Shields, County Durham.
Active	United Kingdom	The ship was driven ashore near Brodick, Isle of Arran. She was on a voyage from Tobago to Greenock, Renfrewshire. She was refloated in May and taken in to Greenock.
ship-Adventure	United Kingdom	The ship ws driven ashore. She was refloated and taken in to Aberdeen.
Ann	United Kingdom	The ship foundered in the North Sea off Arendal, Norway.
Ann	United Kingdom	The ship foundered in the Atlantic Ocean north of Galway. Her crew were rescued.
Ariel	United Kingdom	The ship foundered in the North Sea off Arendal. She was on a voyage from Saint Petersburg, Russia to London.
Augusta	Prussia	The ship was wrecked near Dunkirk, Nord, France. She was on a voyage from Königsburg to Liverpool, Lancashire, United Kingdom.
Barbara	France	The ship was wrecked near Ostend, Lys. Her crew were rescued.
Benevolence	United Kingdom	The ship was driven ashore near Blyth, Northumberland.
Betty	United Kingdom	The ship foundered in the Atlantic Ocean north of Galway with the loss of all hands. She was on a voyage from Limerick to Liverpool, Lancashire.
Brother's Increase	United Kingdom	The ship was wrecked off Saint Andrews, Fife. Her crew were rescued.
Caroline	United Kingdom	The ship was wrecked on the coast of Scotland. She was on a voyage from Liverpool to Africa.
Castra Maria	Portugal	The galiot was wrecked near Fort Luís, Lisbon.
Ceres	Sweden	The brig was driven ashore at Lymington, Hampshire, United Kingdom. She was on a voyage from Marseille, Bouches-du-Rhône, France to Lübeck.
Ceres	United Kingdom	The ship was driven ashore at Bridlington, Yorkshire.
Columbia	United Kingdom	War of the Third Coalition: The ship was captured off Hispaniola by a French privateer on 25 January. She was recaptured but was driven ashore at New Providence, New Jersey, United States. Columbia was on a voyage from New York, United States to the West Indies.
Concordia	Duchy of Holstein	The ship was driven ashore at Tönningen while on a voyage from London, United Kingdom to Kiel.
Confederacy, or Confidence	United Kingdom	The ship was wrecked in the Orkney Islands. She was on a voyage from Saint Petersburg to Dublin.
Constantia	Kingdom of Hanover	The ship was lost off the mouth of the Weser. She was on a voyage from Plymouth, Devon, United Kingdom to Embden, Duchy of Schleswig.
Dantzic	Danzig	The ship was driven ashore at Dragør, Denmark while on a voyage from Danzig to an English port.
Dawson	United Kingdom	The ship was wrecked near Arendal. She was on a voyage from Memel, Prussia to Maryport, Cumberland.
Demerara	United Kingdom	The ship ran aground on the Wicklow Bank, in the Irish Sea. Her crew were rescued. She was on a voyage from Demerara to the Clyde. Demerara later refloated herself and drifted in to Strangford Lough. She was refloated again in June and arrived at the Clyde on the 25th of that month.
Der Hoop	Danzig	The ship was driven ashore at Dragør while on a voyage from Danzig to London.
Dick	United Kingdom	The ship was run into by William and Henry (United Kingdom) in The Downs and was beached on the Sandwich Flats. Dick was on a voyage from London to Saint Vincent. She was refloated with assistance and take in to Ramsgate.
Die Gute Erwedriung	Batavian Republic	The ship foundered on a voyage from Saint Petersburg to Amsterdam, North Holland.
Dolphin	United Kingdom	The ship was driven ashore on Anholt, Denmark. Her crew were rescued.
Eagle	United Kingdom	The ship was wrecked on Gorée.
Echo	United Kingdom	The brig was driven ashore and wrecked on Squam Beach, New Hampshire, United States. Her crew were rescued. She was on a voyage from Savannah, Georgia to New York.
Emanuel	Lübeck	The ship foundered in the North Sea off Arendal while on a voyage from Portsmouth, Hampshire, United Kingdom to Lübeck.
Enigheid	Flag unknown	The ship was driven ashore near Calais, France.
Ethalia or Ethalion	United Kingdom	The ship was driven ashore at Flamborough Head, Yorkshire and was wrecked.
Eucharis	United States	The ship was wrecked on the Banjaret Bank, in the North Sea off Veere, Zeeland, Batavian Republic. She was on a voyage from New York to Rotterdam, South Holland, Batavian Republic.
Fly	United States	The ship was wrecked on the Portuguese coast. She was on a voyage from Baltimore, Maryland to Porto.
Fortuna	Duchy of Holstein	The ship was driven ashore near "Friezand". She was on a voyage from London to Tonningen.
Frickheiten	Sweden	The ship was wrecked in the Orkney Islands. She was on a voyage from Stockholm to Hull Yorkshire United Kingdom.
Friends	United Kingdom	The ship was driven ashore at Dunany Point, County Louth.
Garland	United Kingdom	The ship was driven ashore near Copenhagen, Denmark. She was on a voyage from London to Lübeck.
Goede Verwachting	Prussia	The ship was driven ashore on the "Isle of Leland", on the coast of Jutland.
Granary	United Kingdom	The ship was driven ashore in Carrickfergus Bay. She was on a voyage from Gijón, Spain to London.
Gratitude	United Kingdom	The ship was driven ashore 2 nautical miles (3.7 km) north of Formby, Lancashire. She was on a voyage from Lisbon, Portugal to Cork and Liverpool.
Greetseyl	Prussia	The ship was run aground on the Maplin Sand, in the North Sea off the coast of Essex, United Kingdom. She was on a voyage from London to Emden. She was refloated and taken in to Burnham-on-Crouch, Essex.
Grimaldi	United Kingdom	The ship was driven ashore and wrecked at Liverpool.
Hebe	United Kingdom	The ship sprang a leak and foundered in the Atlantic Ocean while on a voyage from Pictou, Nova Scotia, British North America to the Clyde. Her crew were rescued by Diana (United Kingdom).
Hope	United Kingdom	The ship was driven ashore near Galway while on a voyage from Galway to Hull.
Hope	United Kingdom	The ship was driven ashore near Dartmouth, Devon. She was on a voyage from Guernsey, Channel Islands to Bristol.
Jason	United Kingdom	The ship was wrecked near Hornsey, Yorkshire with the loss of her captain. She was on a voyage from Bridlington, Yorkshire to london.
Jonge Curle	Wismar	The ship was driven ashore on the Norwegian coast. She was on a voyage from Hull to Wismar.
Klein Johan	Denmark-Norway	The ship was driven ashore on Ameland, Friesland, Batavian Republic while on a voyage from Riga, Russia to Ostend, Lys, France. Her crew were rescued.
Liberty	United Kingdom	The ship was lost near Penzance, Cornwall. She was on a voyage from Bangor to Newhaven, Sussex.
Loftus	Batavian Republic	The ship, a cartel, was wrecked at Peniche, Portugal with the loss of over 300 of the 530 people on board. She was on a voyage from Demerara to Amsterdam.
Mahams	United States	The ship was driven ashore and wrecked at Étaples, Pas-de-Calais, France.
Mayflower	United Kingdom	The ship was driven ashore near Blyth.
Middleton	United Kingdom	The ship foundered in the North Sea off Arendal.
Minerva	Hamburg	The ship was driven ashore at Gravelines, Nord, France. She was on a voyage from Saint Thomas, Virgin Islands to Hamburg.
Mohawk	United States	The ship was driven ashore near Boulogne-sur-Mer, Pas-de-Calais, France. She was on a voyage from George Town to Amsterdam.
Nimse	Batavian Republic	The ship was driven ashore on Eierland, North Holland. She was on a voyage from Libourne, Gironde, France to Rotterdam, South Holland.
Nossa Senhora do Livramento	Portugal	The ship was driven ashore at Penzance, Cornwall, United Kingdom. She was on a voyage from Lisbon to Dieppe, Seine-Inférieure, France.
Padstow	United Kingdom	The ship was driven ashore and severely damaged near Falmouth, Cornwall. She was on a voyage from Cardiff, Glamorgan to London. Padstow was later refloated and taken in to Falmouth.
Phoenix	United Kingdom	The ship was driven ashore and severely damaged near Cronstadt, Russia. She was refloated and put in to Cronstadt for repairs.
Piccolus	Prussia	The ship was driven ashore near "Borgum". She was on a voyage from Emden, Duchy of Schleswig to Saint Thomas.
Pincent, or Pinsen	Portugal	The ship was driven ashore and wrecked at Newry, County Down, United Kingdom while on a voyage from Lisbon to Liverpool.
Polly	United Kingdom	The ship was wrecked at Portland, Dorset. She was on a voyage from Newfoundland, British North America to Poole, Dorset.
Portland	United Kingdom	The sloop was driven ashore and wrecked at Pagham, Sussex.
Prince of Wales	United Kingdom	The ship was run down and sunk in the English Channel off Berry Head, Devon. Her crew were rescued.
Rachael	United Kingdom	The ship was driven ashore and wrecked near South Shields.
Ringmore	United Kingdom	The ship was lost off Viana do Castelo, Portugal. Her crew were rescued.
Roebuck	United States	The ship ran aground near Den Helder, North Holland. She was refloated and taken in to the Nieuw Diep.
Sisters	United Kingdom	The ship was driven ashore at Penzance.
St. Anthony	Batavian Republic	The ship caught fire off the north French coast. She was on a voyage from Amsterdam to Bilboa, Spain. She put back to Harlingen, Friesland for repairs.
St. Johannes	Batavian Republic	The ship ran aground on the Enkhuizer Sand, in the Zuiderzee. She was on a voyage from Saint Petersburg to Amsterdam.
St. Lawrence	United Kingdom	The sloop was wrecked at Drogheda, County Louth.
Swallow	United Kingdom	The ship ran aground at Dundalk, County Louth and was severely damaged. She was on a voyage from Lisbon, Portugal to Greenock, Renfrewshire.
Swift	United Kingdom	The sloop was driven ashore and wrecked at Pagham.
Triumph	United Kingdom	The ship was destroyed by fire at Jamaica.
Two Sisters	United States	The ship ran aground near Den Helder. She was refloated and taken in to the Nieuw Diep.
Vigilante	Hamburg	The ship was lost off Ameland. She was on a voyage from Arkhangelsk, Russia to Hamburg.
William	United Kingdom	The ship was driven ashore and wrecked on Anholt.
HMS York	Royal Navy	The third-rate ship of the line was wrecked on Inchcape with the loss of all 491 hands.
Unnamed	United Kingdom	The transport ship was wrecked between Ambleteuse and Cap Gris Nez, Pas-de-Calais, France. All on board survived. She was on a voyage from London to Botany Bay.
Unnamed	Denmark	The ship was wrecked in Bigbury Bay with the loss of all hands.
Unnamed	Kingdom of Hanover	The ship was lost at the mouth of the Maas.
Unnamed	Flag unknown	The ship was driven ashore at Stockholm, near Lübeck. She was on a voyage from Pärnu, Russia to Lübeck.

== February ==
=== 3 February ===
List of shipwrecks: 3 February 1804
Ship	State	Description
Endeavour	United Kingdom	The ship was wrecked on the Goodwick Sands, Pembrokeshire with the loss of two of her four crew. She was on a voyage from Bristol, Gloucestershire to Lancaster, Lancashire.

=== 4 February ===
List of shipwrecks: 4 February 1804
Ship	State	Description
Escape	United Kingdom	The ship was wrecked on the South Sand, in the North Sea. Her crew were rescued. She was on a voyage from Newcastle upon Tyne, Northumberland to Guernsey, Channel Islands.
HMS Hussar	Royal Navy	The fifth-rate frigate was wrecked off the Île de Sein, Finistère, France. Her crew survived, although all but eleven of them were taken prisoner by the French. Those not taken were rescued by HMS Sirius (Royal Navy).
Trident	United Kingdom	The ship was driven ashore at Cork while on a voyage from Liverpool, Lancashire to Montserrat.

=== 5 February ===
List of shipwrecks: 5 February 1804
Ship	State	Description
Thomas	United Kingdom	War of the Third Coalition: The ship was driven ashore on Heneaga by a privateer. She was on a voyage from Virginia, United States to Jamaica.

=== 9 February ===
List of shipwrecks: 9 February 1804
Ship	State	Description
Alexander, and Rising States	United States	The ships were driven into each other at Den Helder, North Holland, Batavian Republic and were both severely damaged. Rising States was on a voyage from Amsterdam, North Holland to New York.
Unnamed	United Kingdom	The sloop was wrecked at the Staddon Battery, Plymouth, Devon.

=== 10 February ===
List of shipwrecks: 10 February 1804
Ship	State	Description
Rattler	United Kingdom	The ship was wrecked at Plymouth, Devon. She was on a voyage from Carmarthen to Weymouth, Dorset.

=== 11 February ===
List of shipwrecks: 11 February 1804
Ship	State	Description
Buxar	United Kingdom	The ship was wrecked at the mouth of the River Don with the loss of all hands. She was on a voyage from London to Inverness
Good Intent	United Kingdom	The sloop was wrecked 3 nautical miles (5.6 km) west of Arbroath, Forfarshire. Her crew were rescued.
Lively	United Kingdom	The sloop was beached at Whitby, Yorkshire.
Lord Dundas	United Kingdom	The sloop was wrecked on the Herd Sand, in the North Sea off South Shields, County Durham with the loss of all on board.
Mayflower	United Kingdom	The ship was wrecked at Plymouth, Devon. She was on a voyage from Penzance, Cornwall to Plymouth.
Peggy and Susan	United Kingdom	The ship foundered in the North Sea off Wemyss, Fife with the loss of all nine passengers and crew. She was on a voyage from Findhorn, Morayshire to Leith, Lothian.
Robert and Mary	United Kingdom	The ship was wrecked on the Herd Sand.
Scipio	United Kingdom	The ship was driven ashore and wrecked at Cowie, Aberdeenshire. Her crew were rescued.

=== 12 February ===
List of shipwrecks: 12 February 1804
Ship	State	Description
Argo	United Kingdom	The ship was driven ashore and wrecked at Great Yarmouth, Norfolk with the loss of all twelve of her crew. Her Master James Sibbald, age 45 was buried at Gorleston-on-Sea, Suffolk along with one sailor not named.
Bom Jesus De Santos	Portugal	The schooner was driven ashore and wrecked at Great Yarmouth, Norfolk, United Kingdom. Her crew were rescued. She was on a voyage from Newcastle upon Tyne, Northumberland, United Kingdom to Lisbon.
Brothers	United Kingdom	The ship was driven ashore at Great Yarmouth. Her crew were rescued. She was on a voyage from Danzig to London.
Dale	United Kingdom	The ship was driven was wrecked on the Haisborough Sands, in the North Sea off the coast of Norfolk. All 22 people on board were rescued. She subsequently came ashore at Sheringham, Norfolk. Dale was on a voyage from London to the West Indies.
Enterprize	United Kingdom	The brig was driven ashore and wrecked at Lowestoft, Suffolk. Her crew were rescued. She was on a voyage from Newcastle upon Tyne, Northumberland to Ipswich, Suffolk.
Fortitude	United Kingdom	The ship was wrecked on the Bondicar Sands, in the North Sea off the coast of Northumberland. Her crew were rescued.
Friend's Increase	United Kingdom	The ship was driven ashore at Horsey, Norfolkf. Her crew were rescued. She was on a voyage from Blakeney, Norfolk to Dublin.
Hannah	United Kingdom	The brig was driven ashore and wrecked at Sheringham with the loss of one life.
Love and Unity	United Kingdom	The ship was driven ashore at Great Yarmouth. She was on a voyage from Guernsey, Channel Islands to Sunderland, County Durham.
Nancy	United Kingdom	The ship was driven ashore and wrecked at Mundesley, Norfolk. She was on a voyage from Great Yarmouth to King's Lynn, Norfolk.
Unnamed	United Kingdom	The tender was driven ashore at Great Yarmouth.
Unnamed	United Kingdom	The sloop was wrecked at Plymouth, Devon.

=== 13 February ===
List of shipwrecks: 13 February 1804
Ship	State	Description
Adeona	United Kingdom	The ship was driven ashore at Great Yarmouth, Norfolk. Her crew were rescued. She was later refloated and taken in to Great Yarmouth.

=== 15 February ===
List of shipwrecks: 15 February 1804
Ship	State	Description
Friendship	United Kingdom	The ship was wrecked on the Hoyle Bank, in Liverpool Bay. She was on a voyage from Ulverston to Liverpool, Lancashire.
Polly	United Kingdom	The ship was driven ashore at Milford Haven, Pembrokeshire.

=== 16 February ===
List of shipwrecks: 16 February 1804
Ship	State	Description
Lark	United Kingdom	The ship was lost off Heneaga. She was on a voyage from Virginia, United States to Jamaica.
USS Philadelphia	United States Navy	USS Philadelphia. First Barbary War: The frigate was set afire and destroyed at Tripoli, Ottoman Tripolitania by personnel from USS Intrepid (United States Navy) to prevent her use by Ottoman forces.
Unnamed	United Kingdom	The brig was driven ashore in the Humber. She was on a voyage from Arkhangelsk, Russia to London.

=== 17 February ===
List of shipwrecks: 17 February 1804
Ship	State	Description
Revenge	United Kingdom	The schooner was driven ashore and wrecked at Milford Haven. Her crew were rescued. She was on a voyage from Padstow, Cornwall to Cork.

=== 19 February ===
List of shipwrecks: 19 February 1804
Ship	State	Description
Flying Fish	United Kingdom	The ship was lost near Faro, Portugal. She was on a voyage from Cork to Gibraltar.
Pallas	United Kingdom	The ship foundered in the North Sea off Bawdsey, Suffolk. Her crew were rescued. She was on a voyage from South Shields, County Durham to London.

=== 20 February ===
List of shipwrecks: 20 February 1804
Ship	State	Description
HMS Cerbere	Royal Navy	The gun-brig ran aground off Berry Head, Devon and was a total loss. Her crew were rescued.

=== 22 February ===
List of shipwrecks: 22 February 1804
Ship	State	Description
Britannia	United Kingdom	The brig ran aground on the Herd Sand, in the North Sea off South Shields, County Durham. All on board were rescued by the lifeboat Northumberland (United Kingdom). Britannia was later refloated and taken in to South Shields.

=== 23 February ===
List of shipwrecks: 23 February 1804
Ship	State	Description
Hunter	United Kingdom	The barque was wrecked on the Cross Sand, in the North Sea. Her crew were rescued. She was on a voyage from Sunderland, County Durham to London.

=== 24 February ===
List of shipwrecks: 24 February 1804
Ship	State	Description
Industry	United Kingdom	The ship was wrecked on the West Hoyle Bank, in Liverpool Bay with the loss of all hands. She was on a voyage from Dundalk, County Louth to Liverpool, Lancashire.
Maggy Lauder	United Kingdom	The sloop was wrecked at Lindisfarne, Northumberland while entering the harbour there. Her crew survived. She was on a voyage from Newcastle upon Tyne to Berwick-upon-Tweed

=== 25 February ===
List of shipwrecks: 25 February 1804
Ship	State	Description
Lovely	United Kingdom	The ship caught fire in the English Channel and was beached near Falmouth, Cornwall. She was on a voyage from Cork to Falmouth.

=== Unknown date ===
List of shipwrecks: Unknown date in February 1804
Ship	State	Description
Airth	United Kingdom	The ship was lost off Strangford Lough. She was on a voyage from Liverpool, Lancashire to Coleraine, County Antrim.
Ann	United Kingdom	The ship was wrecked in the Jade. She was on a voyage from the Jade to London.
Ann	United Kingdom	The ship was driven ashore at Great Yarmouth, Norfolk.
Anna	Russia	The ship was driven ashore at King's Lynn, Norfolk. She was on a voyage from Saint Petersburg to La Rochelle, Charente-Inférieure, France.
Ceres	United Kingdom	The ship ran aground off Ryhope, County Durham.
Deleval	United Kingdom	War of the Third Coalition: The ship was captured by a French privateer in the North Sea and was burnt. She was on a voyage from Newcastle upon Tyne, Northumberland to London.
Freedom	United Kingdom	The ship was driven ashore at Winterton-on-Sea, Norfolk and was wrecked.
Freedom	United Kingdom	War of the Third Coalition: The ship was captured by the French. She was lost going into Boulogne, Pas-de-Calais, France. Freedom was on a voyage from Exeter, Devon to London
Gotha	Sweden	The galiot was lost whilst on a voyage from Gothenburg to Fisherrow, Lothian, United Kingdom.
Happy	United Kingdom	The sloop was wrecked on the Fairness Rock, off Margate, Kent.
Hero	Prussia	The ship was lost at the mouth of the Ems. She was on a voyage from Yorkshire, United Kingdom to the Ems.
Hexham	United Kingdom	The ship was lost near Barth, Swedish Pomerania with the loss of all but the pilot on board. She was on a voyage from London to Lübeck.
Hiram	United Kingdom	The ship was wrecked near Workington, Cumberland. She was on a voyage from Philadelphia, Pennsylvania, United States to Liverpool.
Hope	United Kingdom	The brig was driven ashore at Deal, Kent She was on a voyage from Hull, Hull to Dublin.
Industry	United Kingdom	The ship capsized at Dover, Kent. She was on a voyage from Shoreham-by-Sea, Sussex to London.
Maria and Ann	United States	The brig was wrecked in the Atlantic Ocean with the loss of all hands. The wreck was discovered at 28°40′N 65°45′W on 8 February by Leicester (United Kingdom).
Mary	United Kingdom	The sloop was driven ashore and wrecked at Portaferry, County Down with the loss of two lives. She was on a voyage from Irvine, Ayrshire to Belfast, County Down.
Mayflower	United Kingdom	The ship ran aground and was wrecked at Plymouth, Devon. She was on a voyage from Penzance, Cornwall to Plymouth.
Merchant	United States	The ship was wrecked at Zeepard, Schouwen, Zeeland, Batavian Republic with the loss of all but one of her crew. She was on a voyage from Virginia to Rotterdam, South Holland, Batavian Republic.
Mercury	United Kingdom	The ship was driven ashore at Margate. She was on a voyage from London to Porto, Portugal. Mercury was later refloated and put into Ramsgate. Kent.
Nelly	United Kingdom	The ship was wrecked at Islep Creek with the loss of a crew member. She was on a voyage from Newfoundland, British North America to New York, United States.
Neptune	United Kingdom	The ship was driven ashore and damaged in the River Severn. She was on a voyage from Bristol, Gloucestershire to Cork. Neptune was later refloated and put back to Bristol.
New York	United States	The ship was driven ashore at Deal. She was on a voyage from Virginia to Dieppe, Seine-Inférieure, France. New York was later refloated and put into Ramsgate.
Polly	United Kingdom	The brig was driven ashore and wrecked at Sheerness, Kent.
Susannah	Sweden	The ship was driven ashore at The Lizard, Cornwall. She was on a voyage from Guernsey, Channel Islands to Barcelona, Spain.
Telemachus	United Kingdom	The ship was driven ashore on the coast of Lincolnshire while on a voyage from Arkhangelsk, Russia to London.
Twa Sistra	Sweden	The ship was driven ashore at Calais, France. She was on a voyage from Gothenburg to an Irish port.
Venus	United Kingdom	The ship foundered north of the Orkney Islands. Her crew srvived. She was on a voyage from Hull to Tönning, Duchy of Holstein.
William	United States	The ship was wrecked on Sturrup Key. She was on a voyage from New York to Honduras.
Unnamed	United Kingdom	The ship was wrecked at Anderby, Lincolnshire with the loss of all hands.

== March ==
=== 1 March ===
List of shipwrecks: 1 March 1804
Ship	State	Description
Stadt Copenhagen	Denmark	The ship was driven ashore near Delfzijl, Groningen, Batavian Republic. She was on a voyage from Emden, Duchy of Schleswig to Cádiz, Spain.
HMS Weazel	Royal Navy	The brig-sloop was wrecked in a gale on Cabritta Point, Spain with the loss of one of her 70 crew.

=== 2 March ===
List of shipwrecks: 2 March 1804
Ship	State	Description
Albion	United Kingdom	The ship was wrecked at Peterhead, Aberdeenshire. Her crew were rescued.
Enterprize	United Kingdom	The ship was lost whilst on a voyage from "Newberry Port" to the West Indies.
Sydney Smith	United Kingdom	The ship was driven ashore near Wexford. Her crew were rescued. She was on a voyage from London to Liverpool, Lancashire.

=== 3 March ===
List of shipwrecks: 3 March 1804
Ship	State	Description
Culloden	United Kingdom	The ship was driven ashore and wrecked on Long Island, New York, United States. She was on a voyage from New York City to the Straits of Gibraltar.
Enterprize	United States	The ship was wrecked at Sandy Hook, New Jersey while on a voyage from New York to Guadeloupe.
Margaret and Agnes	United Kingdom	The ship was driven ashore near the Bay of Quick. Her crew were rescued by HMS Tourterelle and Lord Forbes (both Royal Navy).

=== 4 March ===
List of shipwrecks: 4 March 1804
Ship	State	Description
HMS Blanche	Royal Navy	The fifth rate was wrecked off Ouessant, Finistère, France with the loss of 45 of her crew. Survivors were taken as prisoners of war by the French.
Thomas	United Kingdom	The ship ran aground in the Irish Sea off Dublin while on a voyage from Wexford to Liverpool, Lancashire. Her crew were rescued.

=== 7 March ===
List of shipwrecks: 7 March 1804
Ship	State	Description
Hawk	United Kingdom	The ship was wrecked at Aberdeen. Her crew were rescued. She was on a voyage from South Shields, County Durham to Aberdeen.
Hilton	United Kingdom	The ship was driven ashore 5 nautical miles (9.3 km) from Liverpool, Lancashire. She was on a voyage from Lisbon, Portugal to Liverpool.
Jonge Bastian	Prussia	The ship foundered in the North Sea off Harwich, Essex, United Kingdom. Her crew were rescued. She was on a voyage from Emden, Duchy of Schleswig to London, United Kingdom.

=== 8 March ===
List of shipwrecks: March 1804
Ship	State	Description
Nelly	United Kingdom	The ship was destroyed by fire at Great Yarmouth, Norfolk.

=== 9 March ===
List of shipwrecks: 9 March 1804
Ship	State	Description
St. Johanas	United Kingdom	The ship was wrecked in the Shetland Islands with the loss of four of her eight crew. She was on a voyage from London to Tönningen, Duchy of Holstein.
Unnamed	Hamburg	The packet ship foundered off Tönningen, Duchy of Holstein. She was on a voyage from Hamburg to an English port.

=== 12 March ===
List of shipwrecks: 12 March 1804
Ship	State	Description
Louisa	United States	The ship was wrecked on Jura while on a voyage from Charleston, South Carolina to the Clyde.

=== 13 March ===
List of shipwrecks: 13 March 1804
Ship	State	Description
Firm	United Kingdom	War of the Third Coalition: The ship was captured off Barbados by two French privateers and was blown up. She was on a voyage from London to British Honduras.

=== 15 March ===
List of shipwrecks: 15 March 1804
Ship	State	Description
Leven	United Kingdom	The ship was driven ashore at Balconie, Ross-shire and was wrecked. She was on a voyage from Leven, Fife to Dundee, Perthshire.
Thames	United Kingdom	The ship was driven ashore at Whitby, Yorkshire. She was refloated.
Eight unnamed vessels	Flags unknown	The ships were wrecked at Whitby.

=== 16 March ===
List of shipwrecks: 16 March 1804
Ship	State	Description
HMS Gelykheid	Royal Navy	The guardship was driven ahsore in the Humber. She was refloated with a=the assistance of a number of pilot boats.

=== 20 March ===
List of shipwrecks: 20 March 1804
Ship	State	Description
Equity	United Kingdom	The ship was driven ashore at Hartlepool, County Durham.
Frederick	United Kingdom	The ship was driven ashore at Hartlepool.
Henrietta	United Kingdom	The ship was driven ashore at Hartlepool with the loss of her captain. She was later refloated.
Industry	United Kingdom	The ship was driven ashore and damaged at Hartlepool. She was later refloated.
Jannet and Sarah	United Kingdom	The ship was driven ashore at Hartlepool.
London	United Kingdom	The ship was driven ashore at Hartlepool.
Thetis	United Kingdom	The ship was driven ashore at Hartlepool.
Thomas and Ann	United Kingdom	The ship was driven ashore at Hartlepool.
Unnamed	United Kingdom	The sloop ran aground on the North Gare, in the North Sea off the coast of County Durham. She floated off and sank with the loss of all hands.

=== 24 March ===
List of shipwrecks: 24 March 1804
Ship	State	Description
HMS Wolverine	Royal Navy	War of the Third Coalition: The sloop-of-war was sunk in the Atlantic Ocean in an engagement with the privateer Blonde (France with the loss of six of her crew. Survivors were rescued by Blonde.

=== 25 March ===
List of shipwrecks: 25 March 1804
Ship	State	Description
Adventure	United Kingdom	The ship foundered in the North Sea off Whitby, Yorkshire. She was on a voyage from South Shields, County Durham to Hastings, Sussex.
Ann	United Kingdom	The ship capsized off the coast of Lincolnshire. She was on a voyage from King's Lynn, Norfolk to Hull, Yorkshire.
HMS Magnificent	Royal Navy	HMS Magnificent War of the Third Coalition: The Ramillies-class 74-gun third-rate ship of the line struck an uncharted reef while on blockade duty off Brest, Finistère, France, and was wrecked. Her entire crew survived, but one of her lifeboats washed ashore on the coast of France and the 86 men on board it were taken prisoner by the French. They remained prisoners-of-war until 1814.

=== 26 March ===
List of shipwrecks: 26 March 1804
Ship	State	Description
Jean	United Kingdom	The brig was driven ashore near Whitby, Yorkshire. She was on a voyage from Newburgh, Fife to Selby, Yorkshire, or from Aberdeen to Hull, Yorkshire.
Liberty	United Kingdom	The ship was driven ashore and wrecked at Robin Hood's Bay, Yorkshire with the loss of all hands. She was on a voyage from South Shields, County Durham to London.

=== 27 March ===
List of shipwrecks: 27 March 1804
Ship	State	Description
Louisa	United Kingdom	The ship was driven ashore and wrecked at Stockton on Tees, Yorkshire with the loss of all hands. She was on a voyage from Montrose, Forfarshire to Hull, Yorkshire.

=== 28 March ===
List of shipwrecks: 28 March 1804
Ship	State	Description
James and John	United Kingdom	The ship was wrecked at Jersey, Channel Islands. She was on a voyage from Jersey to London.

=== 29 March ===
List of shipwrecks: 29 March 1804
Ship	State	Description
Peggy	United Kingdom	The brig struck the Swadman Rock, in the North Sea off the coast of Northumberland and foundered. Her crew were rescued by a schooner. She was on a voyage from Dundee, Forfarshire to London.

=== 31 March ===
List of shipwrecks: 31 March 1804
Ship	State	Description
HMS Eagle	Royal Navy	The Repulse-class ship of the line was driven ashore and severely damaged at Northfleet, Kent.
Fortune	United Kingdom	War of the Third Coalition: The privateer was driven ashore and wrecked at Livorno, Kingdom of Etruria. Thirteen of her crew survived. They were made prisoners of war.

=== Unknown date ===
List of shipwrecks: Unknown date in March 1804
Ship	State	Description
Acheron	United Kingdom	The bomb vessel ran aground in the River Thames. She was later refloated.
Ann	United Kingdom	War of the Third Coalition: The ship was driven ashore near Havre de Grâce, Seine-Inférieure, France by a French privateer. She was subsequently burnt by HM hired armed cutter Betsey (Royal Navy).
Ann	United Kingdom	The ship was wrecked on the Herd Sand, in the North Sea off the coast of County Durham. Her crew were rescued.
Anna Catharina Margaretta	Duchy of Holstein	The ship was driven ashore on Heligoland. She was on a voyage from Hull, Yorkshire, United Kingdom to Tönningen.
Delve	Prussia	The ship was driven ashore on Ameland, Friesland, Batavian Republic. She was on a voyage from Hull to Emden, Duchy of Schleswig.
Dorothy	United Kingdom	The ship was driven ashore and wrecked at Whitby, North Riding of Yorkshire.
Francis	United Kingdom	The ship departed Grenada at the end of March for Newfoundland, British North America. No further trace, presumed foundered with the loss of all hands.
Harriet & Ann	United Kingdom	The ship was lost whilst on a voyage from Naples, Kingdom of Sicily to Gallipoli, Ottoman Empire.
Hawke	United Kingdom	The ship was driven ashore near South Shields, County Durham.
Hero	United Kingdom	War of the Third Coalition: The ketch was captured and burnt off Crookhaven, County Cork by a French privateer.
James	United Kingdom	The ship collided with William (United States) off Madeira and foundered with the loss of five of her crew. She was on a voyage from Liverpool to New Providence, New Jersey, United States.
Janus	United Kingdom	The ship was driven ashore near Sunderland, County Durham.
Jonge Jacoba	(Denmark) Duchy of Schleswig	The ship ran aground before 15 March. She was refloated and put in to Ameland, Friesland, Batavian Republic.
Laurel	United Kingdom	The ship was driven ashore near Sunderland.
Lumley	United Kingdom	The ship was wrecked on the Cockle Sand, in the North Sea off Great Yarmouth, Norfolk before 6 March with the loss of all hands.
Madonna Tuuliani	Flag unknown	The ship was lost in the Black Sea.
Merchant of Boston	United States	The ship was wrecked at Zeepard, Schouwen, Zeeland, Batavian Republic with the loss of the vast majority of her crew. She was on a voyage from Richmond, Virginia to Rotterdam.
Norwegen	Denmark	The brig ran aground at Gravelines, Nord, France and was severely damaged. She was refloated.
Pallas	United Kingdom	The ship was driven ashore near Sunderland.
Prudence	United Kingdom	The ship capsized in the River Liffey at Dublin. She was later refloated and taken in to Dublin.
Richard	United Kingdom	The ship was driven ashore at Liverpool. She was on a voyage from Virginia, United States to Liverpool.
Rose	United Kingdom	The ship was driven ashore near Redcar, Yorkshire. Her crew were rescued. She was on a voyage from Christiansand, Norway to London.
Semiramis	United States	The ship was driven ashore and wrecked at Nantucket, Massachusetts before 7 March. She was on a voyage from Canton, China to New York.
St. Johannes	United Kingdom	The ship was wrecked in the Shetland Islands, United Kingdom with the loss of four of her crew. She was on a voyage from London to Tönningen.
Sukey	United Kingdom	The ship was driven ashore and wrecked near Whitby.
Three Sisters	United Kingdom	The ship was driven ashore near Sunderland, County Durham.
Vrouw Osting	Batavian Republic	The ship was wrecked near Delfzijl, Groningen, while on a voyage from Emden, Duchy of Schleswig to Amsterdam, North Holland.

== April ==
=== 1 April ===
List of shipwrecks: 1 April 1804
Ship	State	Description
Urania	United Kingdom	The ship was driven ashore and wrecked near Helsingør, Denmark. She was on a voyage from Dysart, Fife to Copenhagen, Denmark.

=== 2 April ===
List of shipwrecks: 2 April 1804
Ship	State	Description
Active	United Kingdom	Captain Nicol's ship was driven ashore and wrecked between Aveiro and Cape Mondego, Portugal. Her crew were rescued. She was on a voyage from Glasgow, Renfrewshire to Jamaica.
Active	United Kingdom	Captain Hornby's ship was driven ashore and wrecked between Aveiro and Cape Mondego. Her crew were rescued. She was on a voyage from Liverpool, Lancashire to Demerara.
Albion	United Kingdom	The ship was driven ashore and wrecked between Aveiro and Cape Mondego with the loss of fifteen lives. She was on a voyage from Greenock, Renfrewshire to British Honduras.
Alfred	United Kingdom	The ship was driven ashore and wrecked between Aveiro and Cape Mondego. She was on a voyage from Bristol, Gloucestershire to Jamaica.
Ann	United Kingdom	The ship was driven ashore and wrecked between Aveiro and Cape Mondego. Her crew were rescued. She was on a voyage from Dublin to Demerara.
Anne	United Kingdom	The ship was driven ashore and wrecked between Aveiro and Cape Mondego.
HMS Apollo	Royal Navy	HMS Apollo The Apollo-class frigate ran aground 9 nautical miles (17 km) south of Cape Mondego and was wrecked with the loss of 62 of her crew.
Ark	United Kingdom	The ship was driven ashore and wrecked between Aveiro and Cape Mondego. Her crew were rescued. She was on a voyage from Bristol to Barbados.
Atlantic	United Kingdom	The ship was driven ashore and wrecked between Aveiro and Cape Mondego. Her crew were rescued. She was on a voyage from Bristol to Saint Vincent.
Bristol	United Kingdom	The ship was driven ashore and wrecked between Aveiro and Cape Mondego. Her crew were rescued. She was on a voyage from Bristol to Jamaica.
Caledonia	United Kingdom	The ship was driven ashore and wrecked between Aveiro and Cape Mondego. Her crew were rescued. She was on a voyage from Glasgow to Jamaica.
Charles	United Kingdom	The ship was driven ashore and wrecked between Aveiro and Cape Mondego. Her crew were rescued. She was on a voyage from Bristol to Saint Kitts.
Clarendon	United Kingdom	The ship was driven ashore and wrecked between Aveiro and Cape Mondego. She was on a voyage from Bristol to Saint Vincent.
Dart	United Kingdom	The ship was driven ashore and wrecked between Aveiro and Cape Mondego. Her crew were rescued. She was on a voyage from Dublin to Grenada.
Diana	United Kingdom	The ship was driven ashore and wrecked between Aveiro and Cape Mondego. She was on a voyage from Bristol to Saint Vincent.
Elizabeth	United Kingdom	The ship was driven ashore and wrecked between Aveiro and Cape Mondego with the loss of six of her crew.
Ellen	United Kingdom	The ship was driven ashore and wrecked between Aveiro and Cape Mondego.
Erin-go-Bragh	United Kingdom	The ship was driven ashore and wrecked between Aveiro and Cape Mondego. Her crew were rescued. She was on a voyage from Dublin to Barbados.
Fame	United Kingdom	The ship was driven ashore and wrecked between Aveiro and Cape Mondego with the loss of eleven lives. She was on a voyage from Glasgow to Grenada.
Ford	United Kingdom	The ship was driven ashore and wrecked between Aveiro and Cape Mondego. She was on a voyage from Liverpool to Demerara.
Fortitude	United Kingdom	The ship was driven ashore and wrecked between Aveiro and Cape Mondego.
Friendship	United Kingdom	The ship was driven ashore and wrecked between Aveiro and Cape Mondego. Her crew were rescued. She was on a voyage from Liverpool to Antigua.
Helen	United Kingdom	The ship was driven ashore and wrecked between Aveiro and Cape Mondego.
HMS Hindostan	Royal Navy	HMS Hindostan. The storeship was destroyed by fire in the Roses Gulf with the loss of three of the 259 people on board.
Jamaica	United Kingdom	The ship was driven ashore and wrecked between Aveiro and Cape Mondego.
James	United Kingdom	The ship was driven ashore and wrecked between Aveiro and Cape Mondego. Her crew were rescued. She was on a voyage from Liverpool to Antigua.
Maria	United Kingdom	The ship was driven ashore and wrecked between Aveiro and Cape Mondego. Her crew were rescued. She was on a voyage from Liverpool to Tortola.
Martha Brae	United Kingdom	The ship foundered off the coast of Portugal.
Mary Isabella	United Kingdom	The ship was driven ashore and wrecked between Aveiro and Cape Mondego. Her crew were rescued. She was on a voyage from Whitehaven, Cumberland to Jamaica.
Minerva	United Kingdom	The ship was driven ashore and wrecked between Aveiro and Cape Mondego with the loss of a crew member. She was on a voyage from Liverpool to Nevis.
Nancy	United Kingdom	The ship was driven ashore and wrecked between Aveiro and Cape Mondego. Her crew were rescued. She was on a voyage from Glasgow to Tobago.
Neptune	United Kingdom	The ship was driven ashore and wrecked between Aveiro and Cape Mondego with the loss of all but five of her crew. She was on a voyage from Bristol to Jamaica.
Peggy	United Kingdom	Captain Barclay's ship was driven ashore and wrecked between Aveiro and Cape Mondego. Her crew were rescued.
Peggy	United Kingdom	Captain Carnochan's ship was driven ashore and wrecked between Aveiro and Cape Mondego.
Perseverance	United Kingdom	The ship was driven ashore and wrecked between Aveiro and Cape Mondego. Her crew were rescued. She was on a voyage from Bristol to Jamaica.
Providence	United Kingdom	The ship was driven ashore and wrecked between Aveiro and Cape Mondego. Her crew were rescued. She was on a voyage from Bristol to Jamaica.
Robust	United Kingdom	The ship was driven ashore and wrecked between Aveiro and Cape Mondego with the loss of two of her crew. She was on a voyage from Greenock to Demerara.
Sally	United Kingdom	The ship was driven ashore and wrecked between Aveiro and Cape Mondego. Her crew were rescued. She was on a voyage from Bristol to Antigua.
Sebastiana	United Kingdom	The ship was driven ashore and wrecked between Aveiro and Cape Mondego. Her crew were rescued. She was on a voyage from Liverpool to Jamaica.
Start	United Kingdom	The ship was driven ashore and wrecked between Aveiro and Cape Mondego.
Susannah	United Kingdom	The ship was driven ashore and wrecked between Aveiro and Cape Mondego. She was on a voyage from Liverpool to Demerara.
Trim	United Kingdom	The ship was driven ashore and wrecked between Aveiro and Cape Mondego. She was on a voyage from Greenock to Tobago.
Triton	United Kingdom	The ship was driven ashore and wrecked between Aveiro and Cape Mondego. She was on a voyage from Bristol to Antigua.

=== 3 April ===
List of shipwrecks: 3 April 1804
Ship	State	Description
Two unnamed vessels	United Kingdom	A brig and a sloop foundered off the mouth of the River Tees.

=== 13 April ===
List of shipwrecks: 13 April 1804
Ship	State	Description
Meanwell	United Kingdom	War of the Third Coalition: The ship was captured and burnt in the North Sea by a Dutch privateer.

=== 14 April ===
List of shipwrecks: 13 April 1804
Ship	State	Description
Henry Addington	United Kingdom	The ship was wrecked on the Barechush Key, off the coast of Jamaica. She was on a voyage from London to Jamaica.
Sally	United Kingdom	The ship ran aground at Margate, Kent. She was on a voyage from London to Jamaica. She was refloated.

=== 15 April ===
List of shipwrecks: 15 April 1804
Ship	State	Description
Medea	(United Kingdom of Great Britain and Ireland) Jersey	War of the Third Coalition: The privateer was wrecked off the Glénan Islands, Finistère, France. All seventeen crew survived but were taken prisoner by the French.

=== 19 April ===
List of shipwrecks: 19 April 1804
Ship	State	Description
Dwina	United Kingdom	The whaler was lost off Greenland. Her crew were rescued.

=== 20 April ===
List of shipwrecks: 20 April 1804
Ship	State	Description
USS Oliver Elsworth	United States Navy	The frigate was driven ashore at Den Helder, North Holland, Batavian Republic.
Three Brothers	United Kingdom	The ship was in collision with Christiana Frances (United Kingdom) in the English Channel off Falmouth, Cornwall and was abandoned. Her crew were rescued by Christiana Frances. Three Brothers was on a voyage from Cork to Dominica. She was later towed in to Topsham, Devon.

=== 23 April ===
List of shipwrecks: 23 April 1804
Ship	State	Description
Unity	United Kingdom	The sloop was wrecked on the Mixon Shoal, in the Bristol Channel with the loss of all three crew. She was on a voyage from Portreath, Cornwall to Neath, Glamorgan.

=== 27 April ===
List of shipwrecks: 27 April 1804
Ship	State	Description
Jonge Rochoff	Bremen	The ship was wrecked on the Goodwin Sands, Kent, United Kingdom, She was on a voyage from Ostend, Lys, France to Marennes, Charente-Inférieure, France.
Nile	United Kingdom	The ship foundered in the Atlantic Ocean (approximately 50°N 28°W). Her crew were rescued by Harmony and May (both United Kingdom). She was on a voyage from Tortola to Liverpool.

=== 28 April ===
List of shipwrecks: 27 April 1804
Ship	State	Description
Horta	United Kingdom	War of the Third Coalition: The ship was captured and sunk off Cape Wrath, Caithness by a French privateer. She was on a voyage from Belfast, County Antrim to "Dronton".

=== Unknown date ===
List of shipwrecks: Unknown date in April 1804
Ship	State	Description
Black River	United States	The ship was wrecked on the Goodwin Sands, Kent, United Kingdom. She was on a voyage from Charleston, South Carolina to Antwerp, Deux-Nèthes, France.
Columbia	United Kingdom	The ship was driven ashore near Liverpool, Lancashire. She was on a voyage from Charleston, South Carolina, United States to Liverpool.
Elizabeth	Danzig	The ship was driven ashore and wrecked near Copenhagen, Denmark. She was on a voyage from Danzig to London, United Kingdom.
Euphrates	United Kingdom	The ship ran aground in the Hooghly River and was damaged. She was on a voyage from Madras to Calcutta, India. She was refloated and placed under repair.
Felicitas	Spain	The ship was driven ashore near Málaga.
Friendship	United Kingdom	The ship was driven ashore at Great Yarmouth, Norfolk.
Goodwill	United Kingdom	The ship was driven ashore near Dublin. Her crew were rescued. She was on a voyage from Whitehaven, Cumberland to Dublin.
Harry	(United Kingdom of Great Britain and Ireland) Guernsey	The cutter was wrecked at Alderney, Channel Islands before 14 April.
Holy Family	Spain	The ship was lost near Alicante.
Hope	United Kingdom	The ship foundered in the North Sea off Harwich, Essex. She was on a voyage from Great Yarmouth to Dublin.
Hope	United Kingdom	The ship was driven ashore near King's Lynn, Norfolk. She was on a voyage from King's Lynn to Trondheim, Norway.
Janus	Denmark	The ship was sunk by ice at Nivaar, near Elsinore.
Mary	United Kingdom	The whaler was driven ashore near Southsea, Hampshire. She was on a voyage from the South Seas to London.
Mary & Eliza	United Kingdom	The ship was lost in Kelleny Bay. She was on a voyage from Dungarvan, County Waterford to Liverpool.
Sisters	United Kingdom	War of the Third Coalition: The ship was captured and sunk by the privateer General Angereaux (France). She was on a voyage from Dartmouth, Devon to Newfoundland, British North America.
Thetis	United Kingdom	The ship was wrecked on the coast of Spain with the loss of all bar a passenger.
True Brothers	United Kingdom	The ship was wrecked on the Kentish Knock. She was on a voyage from Newcastle upon Tyne, Northumberland to Topsham, Devon.
Two Friends	United Kingdom	The ship was lost on the "Kent Knock" in the English Channel off Exeter, Devon.

== May ==
=== 4 May ===
List of shipwrecks: 4 May 1804
Ship	State	Description
Unnamed	Bremen	The ship was wrecked on the Goodwin Sands, Kent, United Kingdom.

=== 7 May ===
List of shipwrecks: 7 May 1804
Ship	State	Description
Nancy	United Kingdom	The ship struck a rock and sank in the Bay of Fundy. Her crew were rescued. She was on a voyage from Liverpool, Lancashire to St. Andrew, New Brunswick, British North America.

=== 15 May ===
List of shipwrecks: 15 May 1804
Ship	State	Description
Hazard	United Kingdom	The ship ran aground off Philadelphia, Pennsylvania, United States.

=== 20 May ===
List of shipwrecks: 28 May 1804
Ship	State	Description
Golden Grove	United Kingdom	War of the Third Coalition: The ship, which had been captured by a privateer on 10 May, was burnt off St. Jago de Cuba. She had been on a voyage from Newcastle upon Tyne, Northumberland to Jamaica.

=== 28 May ===
List of shipwrecks: 28 May 1804
Ship	State	Description
Ann & Mary	United Kingdom	The ship was run down and sunk in the North Sea off the coast of Norfolk. Her crew were rescued.

=== 29 May ===
List of shipwrecks: 29 May 1804
Ship	State	Description
Caledonian	United Kingdom	The merchant ship was destroyed by fire.

=== 30 May ===
List of shipwrecks: 30 May 1804
Ship	State	Description
Quicksilver	United Kingdom	The ship was lost in the Isles of Scilly.

=== Unknown date ===
List of shipwrecks: Unknown date in May 1804
Ship	State	Description
Active	United Kingdom	The ship was driven ashore and wrecked near Whitby, Yorkshire. Her crew were rescued.
Alnwick Castle	United Kingdom	The ship ran aground in the River Thames. She was refloated.
Cargador	Spain	The ship ran aground off the Île-d'Aix, Charente-Inférieure, France.
Chance	United Kingdom	The ship sank at Cádiz, Spain.
Eclipse	United Kingdom	The ship was driven ashore and wrecked near "Gilliliel", Denmark. She was on a voyage from São Miguel Island, Azores to Saint Petersburg, Russian Empire.
Industry	United Kingdom	The ship was driven ashore near Hartlepool, County Durham.
Landsman	Prussia	The ship foundered off Borkum. There were two survivors. She was on a voyage from London, United Kingdom to Emden, Duchy of Schleswig.
Little Charles	United Kingdom	The ship foundered in the Irish Sea off Waterford. She was on a voyage from Liverpool, Lancashire to São Miguel Island, Azores.
Maiden	United Kingdom	The ship ran aground and was wrecked off Lowestoft, Suffolk. Her crew were rescued. She was on a voyage from Aberdeen to London.
Mary	United Kingdom	The ship was driven ashore near Beaumaris, Anglesey. She was on a voyage from Bangor, Caernarfonshire to Newry, County Antrim.
Prudence	United Kingdom	The ship was driven ashore and wrecked near Whitby.
Susannah Margaretta	United Kingdom	The ship was driven ashore near "Ivica".
Tydverdryf	Prussia	The ship foundered in the North Sea off Ostend, Lys, France.
Three unnamed vessels	French Navy	The gunboats were lost off Alderney, Channel Islands with the loss of all 450 people on board.

== June ==
=== 1 June ===
List of shipwrecks: 1 June 1804
Ship	State	Description
Kingston	United Kingdom	The brig was wrecked on Glover's Reef while on a voyage from Kingston, Jamaica to British Honduras. All on board were rescued.

=== 6 June ===
List of shipwrecks: 6 June 1804
Ship	State	Description
Elizabeth	United Kingdom	The ship was wrecked at Biddeford, Devon. Her crew were rescued. She was on a voyage from Guernsey, Channel Islands to Bristol, Gloucestershire.

=== 22 June ===
List of shipwrecks: 22 June 1804
Ship	State	Description
Louisa Charlotta	United Kingdom	The ship was sighted off the coast of Africa, and in great distress. No further trace, presumed foundered with the loss of all hands. She was on a voyage from London to Tenerife, Canary Islands.

=== 23 June ===
List of shipwrecks: 23 June 1804
Ship	State	Description
Alexander	United Kingdom	The ship was driven ashore at Cape Ann, Massachusetts, United States. All on board were rescued. She was on a voyage from Liverpool, Lancashire to Boston, Massachusetts.

=== 24 June ===
List of shipwrecks: 24 June 1804
Ship	State	Description
Reliance	United Kingdom	War of the Third Coalition: The ship was set afire and scuttled in the Gambia River on the coast of Africa to prevent her capture by an approaching French privateer.

=== 25 June ===
List of shipwrecks: 25 June 1804
Ship	State	Description
Kellerbaum	Duchy of Holstein	The ship was driven ashore and wrecked near Tönningen. She was on a voyage from London, United Kingdom to Tönningen.

=== Unknown date ===
List of shipwrecks: Unknown date in June 1804
Ship	State	Description
Alfred	United Kingdom	The ship was driven ashore near Memel, Prussia. She was on a voyage from London to Memel.
Anna Sophia	United Kingdom	The ship was driven ashore and wrecked on Eynhallow, Orkney Islands. She was on a voyage from Rotterdam, South Holland, Batavian Republic to Dublin.
Castor	United Kingdom	The ship was driven ashore and wrecked in Dundrum Bay. She was on a voyage from Jamaica to Liverpool, Lancashire.
Friends	United Kingdom	War of the Third Coalition: The ship was captured and burnt by the privateer Brave (France). She was on a voyage from Jersey, Channel Islands to Virginia, United States.
Friends	United Kingdom	The ship was driven ashore and wrecked near Memel, Prussia. She was on a voyage from London to Memel.
Johns & William	United Kingdom	The ship was lost whilst on a voyage from Dublin to Chester, Cheshire.
Meanwell	United Kingdom	War of the Third Coalition: The ship was captured and burnt in the North Sea by the privateer Unie (Batavian Republic). She was on a voyage from Newcastle upon Tyne, Northumberland to Norway
Mercury	United Kingdom	The ship was run down and sunk in Dublin Bay by Fame (United Kingdom). Her crew were rescued.
Mersey	United Kingdom	The ship was wrecked in the Torres Strait with the loss of 56 of the 74 people on board.
Nancy & Margaret	United Kingdom	War of the Third Coalition: The ship was captured and burn in the North Sea by the privateer Unie (Batavian Republic). she was on a voyage from Peterhead, Aberdeenshire to Christiansand, Norway.
Otter	United Kingdom	War of the Third Coalition: The ship was captured and sunk off Cape Wrath, Caithness by the privateer L'Hirondelle (France).
Prince of Wales	British East India Company	The East Indiaman foundered whilst on a voyage from Madras, India to London.
William	United Kingdom	The brig was driven ashore in Dundrum Bay. She was on a voyage from Liverpool to Newfoundland, British North America.

== July ==
=== 1 July ===
List of shipwrecks: 1 July 1804
Ship	State	Description
Amelia	United States	The ship was driven ashore in the Bay of Ben-Oudet. She was refloated the next day.

=== 7 July ===
List of shipwrecks: 7 July 1804
Ship	State	Description
Andalusia	Spain	The brig was driven ashore on the south coast of the Isle of Wight, United Kingdom. She was on a voyage from Cádiz to Tönningen, Duchy of Holstein.
Unnamed	Flag unknown	First Barbary War:The Galliot ran aground a few miles west of Tripoli while being pursued by the U. S. squadron. She was shelled into a riddled sieve by USS Vixen (United States Navy). Four crew of USS Syren (United States Navy) were killed in one of her boats by musket fire from shore.

=== 9 July ===
List of shipwrecks: 9 July 1804
Ship	State	Description
Mary	(United Kingdom of Great Britain and Ireland) Grenada	War of the Third Coalition: The cutter was driven ashore and wrecked on Grenada to avoid capture by a French privateer.

=== 10 July ===
List of shipwrecks: 10 July 1804
Ship	State	Description
Cornelius Wilhelmm	Duchy of Holstein	The ship was wrecked on the Long Sand or Kentish Knock, in the North Sea off the north coast of Kent, United Kingdom. Her nine crew survived. She was on a voyage from Tönningen to Tenerife, Canary Islands.
Two unnamed vessels	Flags unknown	The ships were wrecked near Margate, Kent with the loss of all hands.

=== 12 July ===
List of shipwrecks: 12 July 1804
Ship	State	Description
Margaret	United Kingdom	The ship was lost in Marichoneal Bay, Jamaica.

=== 14 July ===
List of shipwrecks: 14 July 1804
Ship	State	Description
Dart	United Kingdom	The ship was wrecked at Cape Bajadore. Her crew were rescued. She was on a voyage from Liverpool, Lancashire to Africa.

=== 20 July ===
List of shipwrecks: 20 July 1804
Ship	State	Description
Exchange	United Kingdom	The brig sprang a leak and foundered in the Atlantic Ocean off the Isles of Scilly. Her crew were rescued by John (United States). She was on a voyage from Waterford to London.

=== 21 July ===
List of shipwrecks: 21 July 1804
Ship	State	Description
Speculation	Sweden	The brig was wrecked at Senegal.
William and Margaret	United Kingdom	The sloop sprang a leak off the Isle of Wight and was abandoned by her crew.

=== 25 July ===
List of shipwrecks: 25 July 1804
Ship	State	Description
Eliza	United Kingdom	The sloop caught fire at Newcastle upon Tyne, Northumberland.

=== Unknown date ===
List of shipwrecks: Unknown date in July 1804
Ship	State	Description
Adventure	United Kingdom	The ship was wrecked near Alderney, Channel Islands. She was on a voyage from London to Jersey, Channel Islands.
Aliancen	Sweden	The ship foundered in the North Sea off Southwold, Suffolk, United Kingdom. She was on a voyage from Stockholm to Dublin, United Kingdom.
Ariel	United Kingdom	The ship was lost on the Sand Hammer. She was on a voyage from Liverpool, Lancashire to Saint Petersburg, Russia.
Brutus	Batavian Republic	The ship was wrecked at Falsterbo, Sweden while on a voyage from Amsterdam, North Holland to Stockholm.
Candidate	United Kingdom	The ship foundered in the Indian Ocean with some loss of life.
Caroline	United Kingdom	The ship was lost near Tönningen, Duchy of Holstein.
Del Peys	United Kingdom	The ship was driven ashore at the mouth of the Eider.

== August ==
=== 3 August ===
List of shipwrecks: 3 August 1804
Ship	State	Description
Patriot	Danzig	The ship departed from Danzig for London, United Kingdom. No further trace, presumed foundered with the loss of all hands.
Unnamed	Tripolitania Navy	First Barbary War:The gunboat was sunk at Tripoli in a battle with a United States Navy squadron.

=== 7 August ===
List of shipwrecks: 7 August 1804
Ship	State	Description
Adeona	United Kingdom	The ship was driven ashore and severely damaged in the River Towy. She was on a voyage from Carmarthen to Memel, Prussia.
Gunboat No. 9	United States Navy	First Barbary War:The 25 ton sloop rigged gunboat, a Tripolitan gunboat captured on 3 August, was blown up and sunk at Tripoli by hot shot fired by shore batteries. Her Commander and 15 others were killed, 4 wounded.

=== 8 August ===
List of shipwrecks: 8 August 1804
Ship	State	Description
Cornelia	United States	The ship was discovered wrecked and abandoned in the Atlantic Ocean (46°35′N 30°00′W by Thomas (United Kingdom).

=== 12 August ===
List of shipwrecks: 12 August 1804
Ship	State	Description
Hope	British East India Company	The ship departed from Saugur, India for London. She had not arrived at Saint Helena by 13 January 1805., presumed foundered with the loss of all hands.

=== 13 August ===
List of shipwrecks: 13 August 1804
Ship	State	Description
John & Mary	United Kingdom	The ship was wrecked on the Haisborough Sands, in the North Sea off the coast of Norfolk.
Unnamed	United Kingdom	The ship was driven ashore at Margate, Kent. She was refloated.

=== 24 August ===
List of shipwrecks: 24 August 1804
Ship	State	Description
Unname	Tripolitania Navy	First Barbary War:Two gunboats were reportedly sunk at Tripoli by a United States Navy squadron.

=== 26 August ===
List of shipwrecks: 26 August 1804
Ship	State	Description
Hired armed cutter Constitution	Royal Navy	War of the Third Coalition: The cutter was sunk by French artillery fire in the English Channel off Boulogne, Pas-de-Calais, France.

=== 28 August ===
List of shipwrecks: 28 August 1804
Ship	State	Description
Unnamed	Beylik of Tunis	First Barbary War:The galliot, a Tripolitan prize, was sunk in Tripoli harbor when the town was shelled by a United States Navy squadron.
Unnamed	Ottoman Tripolitania	First Barbary War:The three masted galley was sunk in Tripoli harbor when the town was shelled by a United States Navy squadron.
Three unnamed gunboats	Tripolitania Navy	First Barbary War:One gunboat was sunk, and two beached to prevent sinking, at Tripoli in a battle a United States Navy squadron.
Unnamed	United States Navy	First Barbary War: One cutter, identified as the "black cutter', belonging to USS John Adams (United States Navy) was sunk by shore batteries. Three killed, one WIA.

=== 31 August ===
List of shipwrecks: 31 August 1804
Ship	State	Description
Mary	United Kingdom	The ship departed from Nassau, Bahamas for Liverpool, Lancashire. No further trace, presumed foundered in the Atlantic Ocean with the loss of all hands.

=== Unknown date ===
List of shipwrecks: Unknown date in August 1804
Ship	State	Description
Active	United Kingdom	The ship sprang a leak in the North Sea off Cromer, Norfolk and was abandoned. She was on a voyage from London to Dundee, Forfarshire.
Britannia	United Kingdom	The ship was lost off Saugue, India.
Delight	United Kingdom	The ship foundered in the North Sea off Cromer in mid-August. She was on a voyage from Hull, Yorkshire to Great Yarmouth, Norfolk.
Hannah	United Kingdom	The ship foundered in the North Sea off Great Yarmouth. Her crew were rescued. She was on a voyage from Hull to London.
Hannah	United Kingdom	The ship was driven ashore at Whitby, Yorkshire.
Mary	United Kingdom	The ship was driven ashore near Kirkwall, Orkney Islands. She was on a voyage from Belfast, County Antrim to Copenhagen, Denmark.
Mercury	United Kingdom	The ship departed from Africa for the West Indies. No further trace, presumed foundered in the Atlantic Ocean with the loss of all hands.
Ranger	United Kingdom	The ship was driven ashore at Southend, Essex. She was on a voyage from Demerara to London.
Unnamed	United States	The sloop was wrecked at sea. Her crew were rescued after fifteen days by the brig Keyne (United States. The sloop was on a voyage from Madeira to Boston, Massachusetts.

== September ==
=== 1 September ===
List of shipwrecks: 1 September 1804
Ship	State	Description
Bess	United Kingdom	The ship foundered in the Atlantic Ocean. Her crew were rescued by HMS Uranie (Royal Navy). Bess was on a voyage from Jamaica to Dublin.

=== 2 September ===
List of shipwrecks: 2 September 1804
Ship	State	Description
Enterprize	United States	The ship was wrecked in Surinam in a hurricane.

=== 3 September ===
List of shipwrecks: 3 September 1804
Ship	State	Description
Ann	United Kingdom	The sloop was driven ashore on Antigua in a hurricane and was damaged.
Argo	United Kingdom	The sloop was driven ashore on Antigua in a hurricane. She was refloated.
Argonaut	United Kingdom	The brig was driven ashore on Antigua in a hurricane. She was refloated.
Augusta	United Kingdom	The full-rigged ship was driven ashore on Antigua in a hurricane and was wrecked.
Bacchus	United Kingdom	The sloop was driven ashore on Antigua in a hurricane and was wrecked.
Baxter	United Kingdom	The sloop was driven ashore on Antigua in a hurricane. She was refloated.
Camilla	United Kingdom	The schooner was driven ashore on Antigua in a hurricane and was severely damaged.
Catherine	United Kingdom	The brig was driven ashore on Antigua in a hurricane and was wrecked.
Catherine	United States	The ship was driven ashore on Antigua in a hurricane and was wrecked.
Catherine	United Kingdom	The schooner was driven ashore on Antigua in a hurricane.
Centaur	United Kingdom	The schooner was driven ashore on Antigua in a hurricane and was wrecked.
Chance	United Kingdom	The sloop was driven ashore on Antigua in a hurricane and was damaged.
Charlotte	United Kingdom	The sloop was driven ashore on Antigua in a hurricane and was wrecked.
Charlotte	United Kingdom	The schooner was driven ashore on Antigua in a hurricane and was wrecked.
Commerce	United Kingdom	The schooner was driven ashore on Antigua in a hurricane.
Cumberland	United Kingdom	The packet ship was driven ashore on Antigua in a hurricane and was wrecked. All on board were rescued.
Dagsborough	United States	The schooner was driven ashore on Antigua in a hurricane and was wrecked.
HMS De Ruyter	Royal Navy	The ship was driven ashore in Deep Bay on Antigua in a hurricane and was wrecked with the loss of a crew member.
Edward	United Kingdom	The schooner was driven ashore on Antigua in a Hurricane.
Elizabeth	United Kingdom	The brig was driven ashore on Antigua in a hurricane and was wrecked.
Friends	United Kingdom	The ship was driven ashore on Nevis in a hurricane and was wrecked.
George	Spain	The sloop was driven ashore on Antigua in a hurricane and was wrecked. She was subsequently placed under repair.
Georgiana	United Kingdom	The sloop was driven ashore on Antigua in a hurricane and was wrecked.
Governor Carleton	United Kingdom	The full-rigged ship was driven ashore on Antigua in a hurricane and was wrecked.
Grace	United Kingdom	The schooner was driven ashore on Antigua in a hurricane.
Grand Turk	United Kingdom	The schooner was driven ashore on Antigua in a hurricane.
Hester	United States	The full-rigged ship, a prize, was driven ashore on Antigua in a hurricane and was wrecked.
Jane	United States	The ship was driven ashore on Antigua in a hurricane and was wrecked.
Jannet	Denmark	The sloop was driven ashore on Antigua in a hurricane and was damaged.
John Burke	United Kingdom	The schooer was driven ashore on Antigua in a hurricane.
Little Ann	United Kingdom	The schooner was driven ashore on Antigua in a hurricane and was wrecked.
Lord Nelson	United Kingdom	The schooner was driven ashore on Antigua in a hurricane and was wrecked.
Mary	United States	The brig was driven ashore on Antigua in a hurricane and was wrecked.
Mary	United Kingdom	The schooner was driven ashore on Antigua in a hurricane and was wrecked.
Matthews	United Kingdom	The schooner was driven ashore on Antigua in a hurricane and was wrecked.
McKay	United Kingdom	The schooner was driven ashore on Antigua in a hurricane and was wrecked.
Montezuma	United States	The brig was driven ashore on Antigua in a hurricane. She was later refloated.
Nancy	United Kingdom	The schooner was driven ashore on Antigua in a hurricane and was wrecked.
Neptune	United States	The brig was driven ashore on Antigua in a hurricane and was wrecked.
Ostrich	United Kingdom	The sloop was driven ashore on Antigua in a hurricane.
Peggy	United Kingdom	The brig was driven ashore on Antigua in a hurricane and was wrecked.
Polly	United Kingdom	The sloop was driven ashore on Antigua in a hurricane and was damaged.
Prince	United Kingdom	The sloop was driven ashore on Antigua in a hurricane.
Ranger	United Kingdom	The schooner was driven ashore on Antigua in a hurricane.
Robinson	United Kingdom	The brig was driven ashore on Antigua in a hurricane and was damaged.
Sally	United Kingdom	The sloop was driven ashore on Antigua in a hurricane and was wrecked.
San Nichola	(Ottoman Empire) Greece	The full-rigged ship was driven ashore on Antigua in a hurricane and was wrecked.
Sarah and Maria	United States	The schooner was driven ashore on Antigua in a hurricane and was wrecked.
Sincerity	United Kingdom	The schooner was driven ashore on Antigua in a hurricane.
Tilman	United States	The ship sailed from Charleston, South Carolina for a European port. No further trace, presumed foundered in the Atlantic Ocean with the loss of all hands.
Two Brothers	United Kingdom	The schooner was driven ashore on Antigua in a hurricane and was wrecked.
Union	United Kingdom	The sloop was driven ashore on Antigua in a hurricane and was severely damaged. She was refloated.
Ursula	United Kingdom	The schooner was driven ashore on Antigua in a hurricane.
William	United Kingdom	The sloop was driven ashore on Antigua in a hurricane and was wrecked.
William	United Kingdom	The schooner was driven ashore on Antigua in a hurricane and was severely damaged.
William	United Kingdom	The schooner was driven ashore on Antigua in a hurricane and was damaged.
Three unnamed vessels	(United Kingdom of Great Britain and Ireland) Nevis	The ships were driven ashore on Nevis in a hurricane.
Unnamed	United States	The schooner was driven ashore on Nevis in a hurricane.
Unnamed	Denmark	The sloop was driven ashore on Nevis in a hurricane.
Unnamed	Sweden	The schooner was driven ashore on Nevis in a hurricane.

=== 4 September ===
List of shipwrecks: 4 September 1804
Ship	State	Description
Aurora	United Kingdom	The ship was driven ashore in a hurricane at Saint Kitts. She was on her maiden voyage, from Lancaster, Lancashire to Saint Kitts.
Beckford	United Kingdom	The full-rigged ship was driven ashore and wrecked in a hurricane at Fort Smith, Saint Kitts. Her crew survived.
Centre	United States	The brig was driven ashore and wrecked in a hurricane at Salt Ponds, Saint Kitts.
Concord	United Kingdom	The brig was driven ashore and wrecked in a hurricane at Roseau, Dominica.
Elizabeth	United Kingdom	The brig was driven ashore and wrecked in a hurricane at Roseau. She was on a voyage from Dublin to Dominica.
Francis	United Kingdom	The schooner was driven ashor on Dominica in a hurricane.
USS Intrepid	United States Navy	First Barbary War:The bomb/fireship, a ketch, was blown up and sunk at Tripoli. Her Commander, Captain Richard Somers, 2 midshipmen (or Lieutenants) and 10 crewmen, all on board, were killed. There is speculation that she may have been detonated prematurely when board by Tripolitan forces.
Jason	United Kingdom	The brig was wrecked in a hurricane at Salt Ponds, Saint Kitts.
Maria	Sweden	The schooner was driven ashore on Dominica in a hurricane.
Nelson	United Kingdom	The ship was wrecked in a hurricane at Deep Bay, Saint Kitts.
Nysus	United Kingdom	The full-rigged ship was driven ashore and wrecked in a hurricane at Roseau.
HMS Osprey	Royal Navy	The sloop-of-war was driven ashore on Dominica in a hurricane. Her crew survived.
Pamilio	Sweden	The schooner was driven ashore on Dominica in a hurricane.
Perseverance	United Kingdom	The full-rigged ship was driven ashore on Barbadoes in a hurricane and was wrecked.
Queen Charlotte	United Kingdom	The full-rigged ship was driven ashore on Barbadoes in a hurricane.
St. Bartholomew	Sweden	The schooner was driven ashore on Dominica in a hurricane.
St. Nicholas	United Kingdom	The schooner was driven ashore on Dominica in a hurricane.
Susanna	United Kingdom	The sloop was driven ashore at Soufrière, Dominica in a hurricane.
Try Again	United Kingdom	The sloop, a prize of HMS Eclair (Royal Navy) was driven ashore and wrecked in a hurricane at Roseau.
William Ashton	(Denmark) Danish West Indies	The sloop was wrecked in a hurricane at Sandy Point, Saint Kitts.
William Pitt	United Kingdom	The ship was driven ashore in a hurricane at Saint Kitts. She was later refloated, but was declared a total loss.
Young Nicholas	United Kingdom	The ship was driven ashore in a hurricane at Saint Kitts with the loss of a crew member.
Unnamed	Tripolitania Navy	First Barbary War:One gunboat was missing after the explosion of USS Intrepid (United States Navy) at Tripoli, probably was trying to board and capture Intrepid.
Two unnamed vessels	United States Navy	First Barbary War:One cutter, identified as the "green cutter', belonging to USS John Adams (United States Navy) and another boat were probably destroyed by the explosion of USS Intrepid (United States Navy) at Tripoli, they were intended to be used by Intrepid's crew to escape the explosion.
Unnamed	(France) Saint Barthélemy	The schooner was driven ashore in a hurricane at Saint Kitts.
Unnamed	(United Kingdom of Great Britain and Ireland) Saint Kitts	The sloop was driven ashore and wrecked in a hurricane at Saint Kitts.
Two unnamed vessels	United States	The schooners were driven ashore in a hurricane at Salt Ponds, Saint Kitts.
Unnamed	(United Kingdom of Great Britain and Ireland) Tortola	The privateer foundered in a hurricane with the loss of all but one of her crew.
Seventeen unnamed vessels	Flags unknown	The ships were driven ashore in a hurricane at Roseau. Fourteen of them were wrecked.
Four unnamed vessels	Flags unknown	The ships were driven ashore on Barbadoes in a hurricane.

=== 5 September ===
List of shipwrecks: 5 September 1804
Ship	State	Description
Duke of Cumberland	United Kingdom	The ship was wrecked in a hurricane at Antigua. Her crew were rescued.
John and Thomas	United Kingdom	The brig sprang a leak in the North Sea and was abandoned by her crew, who were rescued by a Prussian vessel. She was on a voyage from Gothenburg, Sweden to Kincardine.

=== 7 September ===
List of shipwrecks: 7 September 1804
Ship	State	Description
Adventure	United States	The ship was lost near the Bahamas. She was on a voyage from Wilmington, Delaware to Jamaica.
Africa	United Kingdom	The full-rigged ship was driven ashore at Charleston, South Carolina in a hurricane.
Christopher	United Kingdom	The full-rigged ship sank at Charleston in a hurricane. She was on a voyage from Africa to Charleston.
Columbus	United States	The full-rigged ship sank at Charleston in a hurricane.
Concord	United States	The brig sank at Charleston in a hurricane.
Christopher	United Kingdom	The full-rigged ship sank at Charleston in a hurricane.
Eliza Ann	United States	The schooner capsized in the Ashley River off Charleston in a hurricane. Her seven crew were rescued. She was on a voyage from Charleston to Nassau, Bahamas.
Favourite	United States	The sloop sank at Charleston in a hurricane.
USS Gunboat No. 1	United States Navy	The Jefferson class Gunboat or No. 1 class gunboat was driven ashore and wrecked at Savannah, Georgia in a hurricane, or was driven ashore in a cornfield on Whitemarsh Island, Savannah,. She was refloated 1 November, repaired and returned to service.
Halcyon	United States	The full-rigged ship was driven ashore at Charleston in a gale. She was on a voyage from Charleston to Bordeaux, Gironde, France.
Lydia	United States	The full-rigged ship was driven ashore at Charleston in a hurricane.
Mary	United States	The schooner sank at Charleston in a hurricane.
Middleton	United States	The full-rigged ship ran aground at Charleston in a hurricane.
Nancy	United States	The brig was driven into Dillo's Creek, South Carolina in a hurricane.
Norfolk	United States	The brig was driven ashore at Charleston in a hurricane.
Republican	United Kingdom	The schooner was driven ashore at Charleston in a hurricane.
Rising Sun	United States	The schooner was driven ashore and severely damaged at Charleston in a hurricane.
Tartar	United States	The brig was wrecked at Charleston in a hurricane. She was on a voyage from Africa to Charleston.
Thomas	United States	The brig was severely damaged at Charleston in a hurricane.
Unanimity	United States	The brig was driven ashore at Charleston in a hurricane.
Venus	United States	The brig was driven ashore on James Island, South Carolina in a hurricane.
Unnamed vessels	United States	Several schooners were driven ashore on James Island in a hurricane.

=== 8 September ===
List of shipwrecks: 8 September 1804
Ship	State	Description
Juno	United States	The ship was lost whilst on a voyage from Jamaica to Baltimore, Maryland.

=== 9 September ===
List of shipwrecks: 9 September 1804
Ship	State	Description
Williamson	United Kingdom	The ship was lost 9 nautical miles (17 km) from Kuressaare, Russia. She was on a voyage from Hull to Saint Petersburg, Russia.

=== 12 September ===
List of shipwrecks: 12 September 1804
Ship	State	Description
Brandywyne	United States	The ship ran aground at Savannah, Georgia in a hurricane.
Brutus	United States	The full-rigged ship was wrecked at Savannah in a hurricane.
Carolina	United States	The schooner was wrecked at Savannah in a hurricane.
Cornelia	United States	The ship capsized at Savannah in a hurricane.
Delight	United States	The ship was driven ashore at Savannah in a hurricane.
Diamond	United States	The brig was wrecked at Savannah in a hurricane.
General Jackson	United States	The ship was driven ashore at Savannah in a hurricane.
Governor Tatnall	United States	The ship was driven ashore on Wilmington Island, Georgia in a hurricane. Her crew were rescued.
Liberty	United States	The sloop was wrecked at Savannah in a hurricane.
Magdalen	United Kingdom	The ship capsized at Savannah in a hurricane.
Mary	United States	The ship was driven ashore at Savannah in a hurricane.
Minerva	United States	The brig was driven ashore at Savannah in a hurricane.
Rachel	United States	The ship capsized at Savannah in a hurricane. She was later righted.
Reward	United States	The ship was wrecked on Ossabaw Island, Georgia in a hurricane with loss of life. She was on a voyage from Jamaica to Portsmouth, New Hampshire.
Savannah Packet	United States	The ship was wrecked at Savannah in a hurricane.
York	United States	The ship was driven ashore at Savannah in a hurricane.

=== 14 September ===
List of shipwrecks: 14 September 1804
Ship	State	Description
Commerce	United States	The ship was driven ashore at Saint Thomas, Virgin Islands in a hurricane.
Diamond	United Kingdom	The ship was driven ashore in Strangford Lough. Her crew were rescued. She was on a voyage from Dublin to Limerick.
Enterprize	United States	The ship was driven ashore on Saint Martin in a hurricane.
Fair Trader	United States	The ship was driven ashore at Saint Thomas in a hurricane. She was later refloated.
Goliah	United States	The ship was wrecked at Saint Thomas in a hurricane.
Hope	United States	The ship was wrecked at Saint Thomas in a hurricane with the loss of all hands.
Lark	United States	The ship was wrecked at Saint Thomas in a hurricane.
Perseverance	United States	The ship was wrecked at Saint Thomas in a hurricane with the loss of all hands.
William	United States	The ship was wrecked at Saint Martin in a hurricane.

=== 15 September ===
List of shipwrecks: 15 September 1804
Ship	State	Description
Dart	United Kingdom	The ship was lost in Broad Strand Bay, County Cork. Her crew were rescued. She was on a voyage from Belfast, County Antrim to Gibraltar.
Duke of Clarence	United Kingdom	The ship foundered off Arkhangelsk, Russia.

=== 16 September ===
List of shipwrecks: 16 September 1804
Ship	State	Description
Twee Gebroeders	Prussia	The ship departed from Newcastle upon Tyne, Northumberland, United Kingdom for Emden. No further trace, presumed foundered in the North Sea with the loss of all hands.

=== 20 September ===
List of shipwrecks: 20 September 1804
Ship	State	Description
James	United States	The full-rigged ship was driven ashore and wrecked in the Bay of Glenelg, Scotland. She was on a voyage from the Batavian Republic to Baltimore, Maryland.

=== 22 September ===
List of shipwrecks: 22 September 1804
Ship	State	Description
Concordia	Batavian Republic	The ship was driven ashore and wrecked at Thisted, Denmark. Her crew were rescued. She was on a voyage from Königsberg, Prussia to Amsterdam, North Holland.
Elizabeth & Mary	United Kingdom	The brig was destroyed by fire at Harwich, Essex.

=== 23 September ===
List of shipwrecks: 23 September 1804
Ship	State	Description
Anstruther	United Kingdom	The ship was wrecked in the Balabac Strait with the loss of about 180 of the approximately 340 people on board.
John and Mary	United Kingdom	The ship foundered in the North Sea off Sandsend, Yorkshire with some loss of life.
Neptune	United Kingdom	The ship was driven ashore at Pillau, Prussia. Her crew were rescued. She was on a voyage from Largo, Fife to Pillau.
Thornhill	United Kingdom	The ship was wrecked in the Balabac Strait.

=== 24 September ===
List of shipwrecks: 24 September 1804
Ship	State	Description
HMS Fortuna	Royal Navy	The frigate was severely damaged in an action in the Atlantic Ocean with two armed vessels, the full-rigged ship Leander and the brig Dolly (both United States), which had mistook her for a French privateer. A crew member of HMS Fortuna was killed.
Swift	United Kingdom	The ship foundered in the North Sea while on a voyage from London to a Baltic port. Her crew were rescued.

=== 26 September ===
List of shipwrecks: 26 September 1804
Ship	State	Description
Jeven Maria	Spanish Navy	The frigate was wrecked on Ameland, Friesland, Batavian Republic with the loss of all but four of her crew.

=== 27 September ===
List of shipwrecks: 27 September 1804
Ship	State	Description
Baltic	United Kingdom	The ship was driven ashore on Gotland, Sweden. She was on a voyage from Saint Petersburg, Russia to Whitehaven, Cumberland. Baltic was later refloated.
Boulette Johanna	Denmark-Norway	The ketch was wrecked on the Goodwin Sands, Kent, United Kingdom. Her crew were rescued by the Deal Lifeboat. She was on a voyage from Bergen to Naples, Kingdom of Sicily.
Mary Ann	United Kingdom	The sloop sprang a leak and was abandoned in the Irish Sea. She was on a voyage from Cardiff, Glamorgan to Exeter, Devon. Mary Ann subsequently came ashore near Tenby, Pembrokeshire.

=== Unknown date ===
List of shipwrecks: Unknown date in September 1804
Ship	State	Description
Anker's Hope	(Denmark) Norway	The ship was driven ashore at Corton, Suffolk, United Kingdom. She was on a voyage from Dram to Falmouth, Cornwall, United Kingdom. She was refloated on 2 October and taken in to Great Yarmouth, Norfolk, United Kingdom.
Bess	United Kingdom	The ship foundered in the Atlantic Ocean while on a voyage from Jamaica to the United Kingdom.
Betsey	United Kingdom	The ship was driven ashore and wrecked on Barbados during a hurricane.
Boletta Johanna	(Denmark) Norway	The ship was wrecked on the Goodwin Sands, Kent, United Kingdom. Her crew were rescued. She was on a voyage from Bergen to Naples, Kingdom of Sicily.
British Tar	United Kingdom	War of the Third Coalition: The ship, a prize of De Eer (Batavian Navy) was burnt in the Wadden Sea by the English. Her crew were captured.
HMS Cormorant	Royal Navy	The sloop-of-war ran aground near Husum, Duchy of Schleswig. She was refloated and taken in to Great Yarmouth, Norfolk.
Cumberland	United Kingdom	The ship foundered at St. John's, Antigua during a hurricane.
Dart	United Kingdom	The ship foundered in the Irish Sea off Kinsale, County Cork. Her crew were rescued. she was on a voyage from Belfast, County Down to Gibraltar.
HMS Drake	Royal Navy	The brig-sloop was wrecked off Nevis.
Eliza	Sweden	The brig was wrecked on the Goodwin Sands with the loss of all but one of her crew. She was on a voyage from Gothenburg to Cherbourg, Seine-Inférieure, France.
Emanuel	Prussia	The ship was wrecked on the coast of Holland. she was on a voyage from the Jade to Lisbon, Portugal.
Endeavour	United States	The sloop was driven ashore and wrecked on Barbados during a hurricane.
Europa	United Kingdom	The ship was driven ashore and wrecked in a hurricane at Saint Thomas.
Friendship	United Kingdom	The schooner was driven ashore and wrecked on Barbados during a hurricane.
HM hired armed cutter Georgiana	Royal Navy	Napoleonic Wars: The cutter ran aground off Honfleur, Calvados, France. She was set afire to prevent her capture by the French, who took her crew prisoner.
Hector	United Kingdom	The ship foundered in Cardigan Bay. Her crew were rescued. She was on a voyage from Antigua to Liverpool, Lancashire.
John's Endeavour	United Kingdom	The ship foundered in the North Sea off Whitby, Yorkshire. She was on a voyage from Sunderland, County Durham to Scarborough, Yorkshire.
Lucy	United Kingdom	The ship was driven ashore on Saint Kitts in a hurricane. She was later refloated, but was declared a total loss.
Maria Elizabeth	Stettin	The ship was wrecked near Marstrand, Sweden with the loss of all hands. She was on a voyage from Stettin to London, United Kingdom.
Mayflower	United Kingdom	The ship foundered in the North Sea sometime between 21 and 23 September. She was on a voyage from Newcastle upon Tyne to Tönning, Duchy of Holstein.
Mercurius	Danzig	The ship was driven ashore on Bornholm, Denmark. She was on a voyage from Danzig to London.
Perseverance	United Kingdom	The ship was driven ashore on Barbados during a hurricane.
Siemen	Denmark	The ship was wrecked on the Swedish coast. She was on a voyage from Saint Croix, Virgin Islands to Copenhagen.
Sybil	United Kingdom	The ship was driven ashore on Barbados during a hurricane.
Thames	United States	The full-rigged ship was driven ashore and wrecked on Barbados during a hurricane.
Tyger	Prussia	The ship departed from Saint Thomas for Emden, Duchy of Schleswig. No further trace, presumed foundered with the loss of all hands.
Wilmington	United States	The ship was wrecked on the coast of Zeeland, Batavian Republic. All on board were rescued. She was on a voyage from Philadelphia, Pennsylvania to Rotterdam, South Holland, Batavian Republic.

== October ==
=== 1 October ===
List of shipwrecks: 1 October 1804
Ship	State	Description
Sally	United Kingdom	The ship foundered while in a voyage from Jamaica to New York City. Her crew were rescued.
Venerable	United Kingdom	The ship was lost in the Northern Triangles while on a voyage from British Honduras to London.

=== 2 October ===
List of shipwrecks: 2 October 1804
Ship	State	Description
Londruke	Kingdom of Hanover	The ship ran aground in the Ems and was severely damaged.
Wilhelmina	Stettin	The ship was driven ashore and wrecked at Calais, France. She was on a voyage from Stettin to Bilboa, Spain.

=== 3 October ===
List of shipwrecks: 3 October 1804
Ship	State	Description
Diligent	United Kingdom	The ship was lost at Bonny, Nigeria. She was on a voyage from Liverpool, Lancashire to Bonny.

=== 4 October ===
List of shipwrecks: 4 October 1804
Ship	State	Description
Good Escape	United Kingdom	The ship departed Newfoundland for Grenada. No further trace, Presumed foundered with the loss of all hands.
Juno	Prussia	The ship was wrecked on Skagen, Denmark. Her crew were rescued. She was on a voyage from Chatham, Kent to a Baltic port.
May Flower	United Kingdom	The ship departed from the Isles of Scilly for Gibraltar. No further trace, presumed foundered with the loss of all hands.
Two Brothers	United Kingdom	The schooner was driven ashore and wrecked in the Bay of Wick with the loss of all seven people on board.

=== 5 October ===
List of shipwrecks: 5 October 1804
Ship	State	Description
John & Thomas	United Kingdom	The ship foundered in the North Sea. She was on a voyage from Gothenburg to Perth.
Liberty	United Kingdom	The ship was driven ashore and wrecked at Whitehaven, Cumberland She was on a voyage from Workington to Whitehaven.
Minerva	United Kingdom	The ship was driven ashore and wrecked at Ballymurn, County Wexford.
Nuestra Señora de las Mercedes	Spanish Navy	Nuestra Señora de las Mercedes. Anglo-Spanish War, Action of 5 October 1804: The frigate was sunk off Cape Santa Maria, Portugal in an action with HMS Amphion, HMS Indefatigable, HMS Lively and HMS Medusa (all Royal Navy) with the loss of 200 of her 240 crew.
Prudence	United Kingdom	The ship was driven ashore and wrecked north of Allonby, Cumberland.
Unnamed	United Kingdom	The brig was wrecked on the Cockle Sand, in the North Sea off the coast of Norfolk. Her crew were rescued.

=== 7 October ===
List of shipwrecks: 7 October 1804
Ship	State	Description
William Pitt	United Kingdom	The ship was lost at the mouth of the Ems. She was on a voyage from Harwich, Essex to Emden, Duchy of Schleswig.

=== 8 October ===
List of shipwrecks: 8 October 1804
Ship	State	Description
Bruton	United Kingdom	The ship foundered off the coast of Lapland whilst on a voyage from Arkhangelsk, Russia to Hull, Yorkshire. There were at least three survivors.
Carleton	United Kingdom	The brig was driven ashore at Whitehaven, Cumberland. She was on a voyage from Jamaica to Liverpool, Lancashire.
Mary	United Kingdom	The ship departed from New Orleans, Louisiana District for Liverpool. No further trace, presumed foundered with the loss of all hands.
HMS Speedy	Royal Navy	The gunboat struck the Devil's Horseblock, Lake Ontario and sank with the loss of all on board.
Unnamed	United Kingdom	The ship foundered in the English Channel off Shoreham-by-Sea, Sussex with the loss of at least two lives.

=== 9 October ===
List of shipwrecks: 9 October 1804
Ship	State	Description
Countess of Northesk	United Kingdom	The ship foundered in the North Sea off Corton, Suffolk. Her crew were rescued. She was on a voyage from Arbroath, Forfarshire to London.
Harmony	United Kingdom	The ship departed from Newfoundland, British North America for Portugal. No further trace, presumed foundered in the Atlantic Ocean with the loss of all hands.
James	United Kingdom	The sloop was driven ashore on the north coast of Norfolk and was wrecked. She was on a voyage from Newcastle upon Tyne, Northumberland to Rochester, Kent.

=== 10 October ===
List of shipwrecks: 10 October 1804
Ship	State	Description
Two Brothers	United Kingdom	The ship was wrecked on Cape Breton Island, British North America. Her crew were rescued. She was on a voyage from Liverpool, Lancashire to Pictou, Nova Scotia, British North America.

=== 11 October ===
List of shipwrecks: 11 October 1804
Ship	State	Description
Franciso	Spain	The ship was wrecked off Rye, Sussex, United Kingdom. Her crew were rescued. She was on a voyage from Cádiz to Antwerp, France.
Iosif (Иосиф)	Imperial Russian Navy	The gabarre was driven ashore and wrecked at Sevastopol. Her crew were rescued. She was dismantled in situ.

=== 12 October ===
List of shipwrecks: 12 October 1804
Ship	State	Description
Commerce	United Kingdom	The ship was wrecked off "Kroonburg", Denmark while bound for Reval, Russia.
28 unnamed vessels	Russia	Two full-rigged ships, two transport ships and 22 barges were driven ashore and wrecked at Odesa with the loss of 60 lives.

=== 13 October ===
List of shipwrecks: 13 October 1804
Ship	State	Description
HMS Firebrand	Royal Navy	During a voyage from The Downs to Dover, the fire ship was wrecked on the coast of England. Her entire crew abandoned ship in her boats and survived, but one of her lieutenants died three weeks later, perhaps because of a lengthy exposure to cold water during the incident.

=== 14 October ===
List of shipwrecks: 14 October 1804
Ship	State	Description
Isabella	United Kingdom	The ship was lost near Cape Fear, North Carolina, United States. Her crew were rescued. She was on a voyage from Wilmington, Delaware, United States to Glasgow, Renfrewshire.
Rachael	United Kingdom	The ship was sighted in the Atlantic Ocean (38°N 60°W) whilst on a voyage from Virginia, United States to Cowes, Isle of Wight. No further trace, presumed foundered with the loss of all hands.
Speedwell	(United Kingdom of Great Britain and Ireland) New South Wales	The ship ran aground near Mount Elliot. She was declared a total loss

=== 16 October ===
List of shipwrecks: October 1804
Ship	State	Description
Juno	Prussia	The ship was wrecked near Skagen, Denmark. She was on a voyage from Chatham, Kent, United Kingdom to Königsburg.
Lady Barlow	United Kingdom	The ship sank at Sydney, New South Wales. She was refloated, repaired and returned to service.
Melcombe	United Kingdom	The coaster struck The Shingles, off the Isle of Wight and sank with the loss of two of her three crew. She was on a voyage from Weymouth, Dorset to Southampton, Hampshire.

=== 15 October ===
List of shipwrecks: 15 October 1804
Ship	State	Description
Theseus	Stettin	The ship was destroyed by fire in the Tagus at Lisbon, Portugal.

=== 17 October ===
List of shipwrecks: 17 October 1804
Ship	State	Description
St. Jan	Prussia	The brig foundered in the North Sea off Texel, North Holland, Batavian Republic. Her crew were rescued. She was on a voyage from Cádiz, Spain to Emden, Duchy of Schleswig.

=== 18 October ===
List of shipwrecks: October 1804
Ship	State	Description
Charlotte Amelia	United Kingdom	The ship was wrecked near Kidwelly, Carmarthenshire. She was on a voyage from Sicily to Bristol, Gloucestershire.

=== 19 October ===
List of shipwrecks: 20 October 1804
Ship	State	Description
Cameron	United States	The schooner was wrecked at sea with the loss of five of her eight crew. Survivors were rescued by the transport ship Rover (United Kingdom). Cameroon was on a voyage from Barcelona, Spain to Boston, Massachusetts.

=== 20 October ===
List of shipwrecks: 20 October 1804
Ship	State	Description
HMS Firebrand	Royal Navy	The gun-brig struck rocks in the English Channel off Dover, Kent and sank. Her crew were rescued.
Providence	United Kingdom	The ship foundered off Bermuda. Her crew were rescued. She was on a voyage from Havana, Cuba to Spain.

=== 21 October ===
List of shipwrecks: 21 October 1804
Ship	State	Description
Carolina	United Kingdom	The ship foundered in the Atlantic Ocean off Cape Canso, Nova Scotia, British North America. She was on a voyage from Halifax, Nova Scotia to Newfoundland, British North America.
Jupiter	United Kingdom	The ship was reported to have foundered on this date whilst on a voyage from Memel, Prussia to London. She was subsequently found at sea crewless and towed in to a Norwegian port.

=== 22 October ===
List of shipwrecks: 22 October 1804
Ship	State	Description
Polly	United Kingdom	The ship foundered in the Atlantic Ocean. Thirty-five passengers and crew were rescued. She was on a voyage from Gibraltar to London.

=== 23 October ===
List of shipwrecks: 23 October 1804
Ship	State	Description
HMS Conflict	United Kingdom	The gun-brig ran aground off Nieuwpoort, Lys, France and was wrecked. Her crew were rescued by HMS Cruizer (Royal Navy).

=== 24 October ===
List of shipwrecks: October 1804
Ship	State	Description
Jane	United Kingdom	The ship foundered in the North Sea. Her crew were rescued. She was on a voyage from Stockholm, Sweden to Great Yarmouth, Norfolk.
Robert & Sarah	United Kingdom	The ship was lost on "Dumness".

=== 25 October ===
List of shipwrecks: 25 October 1804
Ship	State	Description
Grizzy	United Kingdom	The sloop struck the Tuskar Rock and was wrecked with the loss of all but one of her crew. the survivor was rescued from the rock on 27 October. She was on a voyage from Liverpool, Lancashire to Galway and/or Tralee, County Kerry.

=== 26 October ===
List of shipwrecks: 26 October 1804
Ship	State	Description
Argo	United Kingdom	The ship was wrecked at Tynemouth, Northumberland. She was on a voyage from South Shields, County Durham to King's Lynn, Norfolk.
Christina Frances	United Kingdom	The ship departed from Tortola for Liverpool, Lancashire. No further trace, presumed foundered with the loss of all hands.
Polly	United Kingdom	The ship was wrecked in the Cattewater.

=== 27 October ===
List of shipwrecks: 27 October 1804
Ship	State	Description
Active	United Kingdom	The ship was wrecked near "Baldogh" with the loss of all hands.
Ceylam	Portugal	The ship sprang a leak in the Atlantic Ocean and was abandoned. Her crew were rescued by Sea Horse (United States). She was on a voyage from Lisbon to New York, United States.
Trowbridge	United Kingdom	The snow collided with a collier and foundered off Hollesley Bay, Suffolk with the loss of all hands. She was on a voyage from Königsberg, Prussia to London.

=== 28 October ===
List of shipwrecks: 28 October 1804
Ship	State	Description
Speedwell	United Kingdom	The ship foundered in the English Channel off Plymouth, Devon. Her crew were rescued. She was on a voyage from Cork to Southampton, Hampshire.

=== 29 October ===
List of shipwrecks: 29 October 1804
Ship	State	Description
John	United Kingdom	The ship was wrecked at Owthorne, Yorkshire with the loss of two of her crew. She was on a voyage from Danzig to London.

=== 30 October ===
List of shipwrecks: 30 October 1804
Ship	State	Description
Ceres	United Kingdom	The ship was driven ashore crewless and wrecked near Great Yarmouth, Norfolk.
Queen of Naples	United Kingdom	The ship was driven ashore near Helsingør, Denmark. She was on a voyage from Saint Petersburg, Russia to London. She was later refloated.

=== 31 October ===
List of shipwrecks: 31 October 1804
Ship	State	Description
Grezzie	United Kingdom	The ship struck the Tuskar Rock, Ireland and was wrecked with the loss of all but one of her crew. She was on a voyage from Liverpool, Lancashire to Tralee, County Kerry.
Louiza	Batavian Republic	The ship was wrecked off Terschelling, Friesland. She was on a voyage from Riga, Russia to Amsterdam, North Holland.
Unnamed	United Kingdom	The fishing smack was run down and sunk in the English Channel off Berry Head, Devon by HMS Liberty (Royal Navy). Her crew were rescued.

=== Unknown date ===
List of shipwrecks: Unknown date in October 1804
Ship	State	Description
Active	United Kingdom	The ship was wrecked near Dublin with the loss of all hands. She was on a voyage from Newport, Monmouthshire to Swansea, Glamorgan.
Albion	United Kingdom	The ship was wrecked on the Siska Rocks, in the Baltic Sea. Her crew survived. She was on a voyage from Saint Petersburg, Russia to Dundee, Forfarshire.
Amity	United Kingdom	The brig was wrecked on the Gunfleet Sand, in the North Sea.
Anna Elizabeth	United Kingdom	The ship was driven ashore at Bridlington, Yorkshire. She was on a voyage from Great Yarmouth, Norfolk to Tönning, Duchy of Holstein.
Anna Maria	Stettin	The ship was wrecked on the coast of Jutland. She was on a voyage from Stettin to London, United Kingdom.
Auspicious	United Kingdom	The sloop was wrecked at Cranfield Point, County Down.
Chester Trader	United Kingdom	The sloop sank in the harbour at Dublin. She was on a voyage from Carmarthen to Dublin.
Christian	United Kingdom	The ship was lost near Memel, Prussia. She was on a voyage from Dublin to Memel.
Diligence	United Kingdom	The ship was wrecked on a reef 10 nautical miles (19 km) off Hogland, Russia. She was on a voyage from Leith, Lothian to Saint Petersburg.
Einigheid	(Denmark) Norway	The ship was wrecked on the coast of Holland. She was on a voyage from Bergen to Naples, Kingdom of Sicily.
Europa	Danzig	The ship struck the quayside at Liverpool, Lancashire, United Kingdom and sank. She was on a voyage from Danzig to Liverpool.
Jane	United Kingdom	The ship foundered in the Kattegat. Her crew were rescued.
Jupiter	United Kingdom	The ship sprang a leak and was abandoned off Skagen. she was on a voyage from Memel to London.
Les Bons Enfans	Danzig	The ship foundered in the North Sea off Great Yarmouth. Her crew were rescued. She was on a voyage from Danzig to London.
Mary	United Kingdom	The ship was driven ashore at Portland, Dorset. She was on a voyage from Plymouth, Devon to Sunderland, County Durham.
Nylpferd	Batavian Republic	The ship was lost on the coast of Holland. She was on a voyage from Liverpool to Rotterdam.
Olive Branch	United Kingdom	The ship was driven ashore at Bridlington.
Otter	United Kingdom	The ship foundered off North Foreland, Kent. Her crew survived. She was on a voyage from Wisbech, Cambridgeshire to Rye, Sussex.
Princess of Wales	United Kingdom	The ship was wrecked on the Wicklow Banks, in the Irish Sea with the loss of all but six of her crew. One survivor was rescued by Hope (United States); five more reached Llanhearn, Caernarfonshire in a boat.
San Francisco Xavier	Spain	The ship was wreecked near Rye. She was on a voyage from Cádiz to Antwerp, Deux-Nèthes, France.
Speedwell	United Kingdom	The ship was wrecked near Plymouth, Devon.
Wisselvellaligheid de Byer	Batavian Republic	The ship was wrecked near Ostend, Lys, France. Her crew were rescued.

== November ==
=== 1 November ===
List of shipwrecks: 1 November 1804
Ship	State	Description
Neptunus	Batavian Republic	The ship was wrecked off Brassay, Shetland Islands, United Kingdom with the loss of all hands.
William and Mary	United Kingdom	War of the Third Coalition: The brig was damaged in an encounter with a French privateer and consequently foundered in the North Sea off the mouth of the River Tyne. All eleven people on board survived.

=== 2 November ===
List of shipwrecks: 2 November 1804
Ship	State	Description
Ann	United Kingdom	The ship was driven ashore and wrecked at Great Yarmouth, Norfolk. Her crew were rescued. She was on a voyage from Danzig to London.
Courier	Sweden	The ship was driven ashore and wrecked east of Calais, France.
Die Erndte	Prussia	The ship was driven ashore and wrecked at Sullom Voe, Shetland Islands, United Kingdom. Her crew were rescued. She was on a voyage from Pillau to London.
Duke of Clarence	United Kingdom	The cutter was driven ashore and wrecked east of Calais. All twenty people on board were rescued. She was on a voyage from Saint Petersburgh, Russia to Guernsey, Channel Islands.
Exchange	United Kingdom	The ship was driven ashore and wrecked at Great Yarmouth. Her crew were rescued.
George	United Kingdom	The ship ran aground on the Home Sand, in the North Sea off Great Yarmouth. Her twelve crew were rescued. She later refloated and came ashore at Pakefield, Suffolk, where she was wrecked. George was on a voyage from Danzig to London.
Le Formazura	Portugal	The ship was driven ashore and wrecked east of Calais, She was on a voyage from Saint Petersburgh to Porto.
Olive	United Kingdom	The ship was driven ashore and wrecked at Great Yarmouth. She was on a voyage from Hull, Yorkshire to Great Yarmouth.
Olive	United Kingdom	The ship departed from Harwich, Essex for Exeter, Devon. No further trace, presumed foundered with the loss of all hands.
Phœnix	Danzig	The ship was driven ashore and wrecked east of Calais. She was on a voyage from Danzig to Barcelona, Spain.
Wilhelmina	Prussia	The galiot was driven ashore and wrecked east of Calais, She was on a voyage from Danzig to Bilboa, Spain.

=== 3 November ===
List of shipwrecks: 3 November 1804
Ship	State	Description
HMS Adder	Royal Navy	The sloop-of-war was driven ashore near New Romney, Kent and was wrecked. Her crew survived.
Betsey	United Kingdom	The ship was run down and sunk in the English Channel off Dungeness, Kent by HMS Bold (Royal Navy). Her crew were rescued. She was on a voyage from Poole, Dorset to Hull, Yorkshire.
Betsey	United Kingdom	The ship was driven ashore near Dublin with the loss of her captain. She was on a voyage from Rothesay, Bute to Ballyshannon, County Donegal.
Friendship	United Kingdom	The ship was wrecked at "Lavens Karen". She was on a voyage from Saint Petersburg, Russia to Cork.
Koning van Prussen	Prussia	The ship collided with another vessel in the North Sea 4 nautical miles (7.4 km) off Nieuwpoort, Lys, France and sank with the loss of all hands. She was on a voyage from Marennes, Charente-Inférieure, France to Ostend, Lys.
L'Athenaise	United Kingdom	The ship was wrecked at the mouth of the New River, Spanish Florida while on a voyage from Port Royal, Jamaica to Morlaix, Finistère, France with the loss of about ten lives. Over 170 people were rescued by an American ship.
Sally	United Kingdom	The sloop was wrecked south of the mouth of the New River.
Three Brothers	United Kingdom	The ship was wrecked off Dublin. Her crew were rescued by the Dublin Lifeboat. She was on a voyage from Bristol, Gloucestershire to Dublin.
Unnamed	United Kingdom	The collier, a brig, was driven ashore and wrecked between Dungeness and New Romney with the loss of three of her crew.
Unnamed	Sweden	The brig was driven ashore and wrecked near the Dungeness Lighthouse.

=== 4 November ===
List of shipwrecks: November 1804
Ship	State	Description
Bourdeaux	United Kingdom	The yacht departed from Cork for Barbados. No further trace, presumed foundered in the Atlantic Ocean with the loss of all hands.
Cadiz Packet	United Kingdom	The ship ran aground on the Wallet, in the North Sea. She was on a voyage from London to Hull, Yorkshire.
Neptune	United Kingdom	The brig was wrecked on Courtmasherry Bay. Her crew were rescued.

=== 5 November ===
List of shipwrecks: 5 November 1804
Ship	State	Description
HM Hired armed vessel Duchess of Bedford	Royal Navy	The armed defence ship was driven ashore near Sandown Castle, Kent. She was refloated with assistance on 12 November and taken to Ramsgate for repairs.
Cecelia Margaretha	Duchy of Holstein	The ship was driven ashore and wrecked at Mappleton, Yorkshire, United Kingdom with the loss of seven of her eight crew. She was on a voyage from Liepāja, Russia to Lisbon, Portugal.
James	United Kingdom	The ship was wrecked on the West Burrows Sand, in the North Sea off the coast of Essex. She was on a voyage from Boston, Lincolnshire to Rotterdam, South Holland, Batavian Republic.
Recovery	United Kingdom	The brig sank in the Bristol Channel off The Mumbles, Glamorgan. She was later refloated.
Union	United Kingdom	The packet ship was wrecked off Dublin. All on board were rescued.

=== 6 November ===
List of shipwrecks: 6 November 1804
Ship	State	Description
Catharina	Sweden	The ship foundered while on a voyage from Strömstad to Saint Petersburg, Russia.
Elizabeth	Russia	The ship was destroyed by fire in the North Sea off Cromer, Norfolk, United Kingdom with the loss of fourteen of her eighteen crew. Survivors were rescued by HMS Ranger (Royal Navy). She was on a voyage from Riga to Morlaix, Finistère, France.
Leicester	United Kingdom	The packet ship was driven ashore and wrecked at Dublin. All on board were rescued.

=== 7 November ===
List of shipwrecks: 7 November 1804
Ship	State	Description
Doncaster	United Kingdom	The ship foundered off Hollesley Bay, Suffolk. Her crew were rescued. She was on a voyage from Thorne, Yorkshire to London.
Flaxton	United Kingdom	The ship ran aground on the Herd Sand, in the North Sea of the coast of County Durham. She was on a voyage from Memel, Prussia to Hull Yorkshire. Flaxton was later refloated and came ashore at North Shields, Northumberland where she was wrecked.
Justina Maria	Duchy of Holstein	The ship was wrecked at Wicklow, United Kingdom. She was on a voyage from Liverpool, Lancashire, United Kingdom to Tönning.
Maria	United Kingdom	The ship was driven ashore att Orfordness, Suffolk.
Stranger	United Kingdom	The ship was wrecked at Rochester, Kent. She was on a voyage from Saint Petersburg, Russia to Chatham, Kent.

=== 8 November ===
List of shipwrecks: 8 November 1804
Ship	State	Description
Fair American	United States	The ship departed from New York for Cádiz, Spain. She had not arrived by 8 March 1805. Presumed foundered with the loss of all hands.
William and Mary	United Kingdom	War of the Third Coalition: The ship was sunk in the North Sea off the mouth of the Tees in an engagement with a lugger privateer.

=== 10 November ===
List of shipwrecks: 10 November 1804
Ship	State	Description
Elizabeth and Margaret	United Kingdom	The ship foundered in the Irish Sea off Dungarvan, County Waterford. She was on a voyage from Swansea, Glamorgan to Waterford.
Graces	United Kingdom	The brig was driven ashore at Dublin. She was on a voyage from Bristol, Gloucestershire to Dublin. Graces was later refloated.
Joseph and Mary Ann	United Kingdom	The ship foundered in the Irish Sea off Wexford. She was on a voyage from Poole, Dorset to Liverpool, Lancashire.
Melina Elizabeth	(Denmark) Norway	The ship was wrecked on the Gaw Bank, in the River Tay. She was on a voyage from Kristiansand to Dundee, Forfarshire, United Kingdom.
Ranger	United Kingdom	The ship was driven ashore and wrecked at Portland, Dorset. She was on a voyage from Weymouth, Dorset to London.
Two Sisters	Sweden	The ship was driven ashore on the coast of Norfolk, United Kingdom. She was on a voyage from Gothenburg to London.

=== 11 November ===
List of shipwrecks: 11 November 1804
Ship	State	Description
Elizabeth	United Kingdom	The ship was driven ashore at Wells-next-the-Sea, Norfolk. Her crew were rescued. She was on a voyage from Hull, Yorkshire to Great Yarmouth, Norfolk.

=== 12 November ===
List of shipwrecks: 12 November 1804
Ship	State	Description
Elizabeth	United Kingdom	The ship was wrecked at Memel, Prussia. Her crew were rescued.

=== 13 November ===
List of shipwrecks: 13 November 1804
Ship	State	Description
Mary	United Kingdom	The ship struck a rock and foundered off Belfast, County Antrim with the loss of all but one of her crew. She was on a voyage from Liverpool, Lancashire to Southwold, Suffolk.

=== 14 November ===
List of shipwrecks: 14 November 1804
Ship	State	Description
America	United States	The ship foundered while on a voyage from Baltimore, Maryland to Charleston, South Carolina. Her crew were rescued.
Venus	United Kingdom	The ship was driven ashore at Mundesley, Norfolk and was wrecked. Her crew were rescued. She was on a voyage from Danzig, to Plymouth, Devon.

=== 15 November ===
List of shipwrecks: 15 November 1804
Ship	State	Description
Lady Nelson	United Kingdom	The whaler was wrecked in the Galapagos Islands. Her crew were rescued. She was on a voyage from the South Seas to London.
Nancy Bull	United States	The ship was wrecked off the Currituck Inlet. All on board were rescued. She was on a voyage from Saint Jago de Cuba, Cuba to Baltimore, Maryland.

=== 16 November ===
List of shipwrecks: 16 November 1804
Ship	State	Description
Albson	United Kingdom	The ship was wrecked on the Home Sand, in the North Sea off Great Yarmouth, Norfolk. Her crew were rescued. She was on a voyage from Newcastle upon Tyne, Northumberland to London.

=== 17 November ===
List of shipwrecks: 17 November 1804
Ship	State	Description
Hired armed ship Hannibal	Royal Navy	The ship was driven ashore north of Sandown Castle, Kent, and was wrecked.
Jenny	United Kingdom	The collier, a brig, was driven ashore at Sandwich, Kent and was wrecked. She was on a voyage from London to Weymouth, Dorset.
Unnamed	Flag unknown	The brig was driven ashore between Deal and Walmer Castle, Kent.

=== 19 November ===
List of shipwrecks: 19 November 1804
Ship	State	Description
HMS Romney	Royal Navy	War of the Third Coalition: HMS Romney. The fourth-rate ship of the line ran aground in the North Sea off Texel, North Holland, Batavian Republic and was wrecked with the loss of 28 of her crew. Twelve survivors were rescued by the cutter Alert (United Kingdom). The rest were taken as prisoners of war.
Three Sisters	United Kingdom	The transport ship, a smack, was wrecked on Hayling Island, Hampshire with the loss of six lives. She was on a voyage from Gibraltar to Portsmouth, Hampshire.

=== 22 November ===
List of shipwrecks: 23 November 1804
Ship	State	Description
Onderneeming	Batavian Republic	The ship was wrecked near Hellevoet, Zeeland.

=== 23 November ===
List of shipwrecks: 23 November 1804
Ship	State	Description
Catherine	United Kingdom	The ship foundered in the Baltic Sea east of Bornholm, Denmark, Her crew were rescued. She was on a voyage from Danzig to Kirkcaldy, Fife.
Swan	United Kingdom	The ship collided with Qork and sank off Grimsby, Lincolnshie. Swan was on a voyage from South Shields, Countyb Durham to London[.

=== 24 November ===
List of shipwrecks: 24 November 1804
Ship	State	Description
Hired armed cutter Duke of Clarence	Royal Navy	The hired armed cutter sank after striking a submerged rock off Granville, France. The hired armed cutter Albion rescued her entire crew.
Nelly	United Kingdom	The brig was driven ashore and wrecked in Tor Bay. She was on a voyage from Teignmouth, Devon to Liverpool, Lancashire.
HMS Venerable	Royal Navy	HMS Venerable. The third-rate ship-of-the-line was driven ashore and wrecked in Tor Bay with the loss of three or four of her crew.

=== 26 November ===
List of shipwrecks: November 1804
Ship	State	Description
Ancient Briton	United Kingdom	The ship struck an anchor and sank at Milford, Pembrokeshire.

=== 27 November ===
List of shipwrecks: 27 November 1804
Ship	State	Description
Contre Amiral Magon	France	War of the Third Coalition: The brig, a prize of Cruizer (United Kingdom, was driven ashore at Great Yarmouth, Norfolk, United Kingdom and was damaged. She was repaired.
Eliza	United Kingdom	The ship was driven ashore in North Bay, Dublin. Her crew were rescued.
Triumph	United Kingdom	The ship was driven ashore in North Bay, Dublin. Her crew were rescued.

=== 28 November ===
List of shipwrecks: 28 November 1804
Ship	State	Description
General Wayne	United Kingdom	The ship was driven ashore in the Eyder. She was later refloated.
Hambro Packet	United Kingdom	The ship was driven ashore in the Eyder.

=== 30 November ===
List of shipwrecks: 30 November 1804
Ship	State	Description
Supply	United Kingdom	The ship was run down and sunk in the River Thames. Her crew were rescued. She was on a voyage from Sunderland, County Durham to London.

=== Unknown date ===
List of shipwrecks: Unknown date in November 1804
Ship	State	Description
Accomplished Quaker	United Kingdom	The ship foundered in the North Sea off Trondheim, Norway. Her crew were rescued. She was on a voyage from Arkhangelsk, Russia to London.
Amphion	United States	The ship was wrecked on the Haaks Bank, in the North Sea off the coast of Holland. She was on a voyage from New York to Amsterdam, North Holland, Batavian Republic.
Ann	United Kingdom	The ship foundered at sea. She was on a voyage from New York, United States to Hull, Yorkshire.
Anna Catherina	Prussia	The ship was wrecked on Terschelling, Friesland, Batavian Republic. She was on a voyage from Riga, Russia to Varel.
Anna Charlotta	Prussia	The ship was driven ashore at Lymington, Hampshire while on a voyage from Bristol, Gloucestershire, United Kingdom to Emden, Duchy of Schleswig. She was later refloated and taken in to Cowes, Isle of Wight.
Boa Uriano	Portugal	The ship was driven ashore in the Cape Verde Islands. She was on a voyage from Cape Verde to Lisbon.
Canaren	Spain	The schooner foundered with the loss of all but three of her crew. Survivors were rescued by Polly (United Kingdom).
Catherina	Sweden	The ship was lost off "Helingford". She was on a voyage from Stralsund to Saint Petersburg.
Cecelia	Lübeck	The whaler was driven ashore on the Holderness coast, United Kingdom and was wrecked.
Charlotta	Duchy of Holstein	The ship was driven ashore at Broadstairs, Kent, United Kingdom. She was on a voyage from Tönningen to Seville, Spain.
Charlotte and Ann	United Kingdom	The ship foundered in Tramore Bay. She was on a voyage from Liverpool, Lancashire to Galway.
Duke of Kent	United Kingdom	The ship ran aground on the Gavin Spit, off Sheerness, Kent before 19 November.
Endeavour	United Kingdom	The ship was driven ashore near Great Yarmouth, Norfolk. She was on a voyage from Dysart, Fife to Weymouth, Dorset.
Eurydice	Prussia	The ship was driven ashore at Dungeness, Kent, United Kingdom. She was on a voyage from Valencia, Spain to Emden, Duchy of Schleswig.
Fanny	United Kingdom	The ship was driven ashore and wrecked near Pillau, Prussia. She was on a voyage from London to Königsburg, Prussia
Friendship	United Kingdom	The ship was wrecked on Hainan, China. Her crew were rescued.
George & Francis	United Kingdom	War of the Third Coalition: The ship was captured off Land's End, Cornwall by the privateer General Pirignen (France). She subsequently foundered.
Hannah Maria	United Kingdom	The ship was wrecked at Rush, County Dublin.
Hope	United Kingdom	The ship was run down and sunk in the English Channel off Beachy Head, Sussex. Her crew were rescued.
Johannes der Taufer	Prussia	The ship was wrecked on Terschelling. She was on a voyage from Riga to Varel.
John	United Kingdom	The ship was driven ashore and wrecked at Bridlington, Yorkshire with the loss of two of her crew, She was on a voyage from Danzig to London.
John and Mary	United Kingdom	The brig foundered off Sanday, Orkney Islands.
Lucy	United Kingdom	The ship was driven ashore in the Belfast Lough. She was on a voyage from Liverpool to Barbados. She was refloated and put back to Liverpool.
Margaretta	Lübeck	The whaler was driven ashore on the Holderness coast and was wrecked.
Martin	United Kingdom	The ship foundered while on a voyage from Selby, Yorkshire to London. Her crew were rescued.
Mary	United Kingdom	The ship was driven ashore at Orfordness, Suffolk. Her crew were rescued.
Mary	United Kingdom	The ship foundered off Dundrum, County Antrim. She was on a voyage from Liverpool to London.
Monton	United Kingdom	The ship foundered in the North Sea while on a voyage from Selby, Yorkshire to London. Her crew were rescued.
Morg	United Kingdom	The ship foundered in Dundrum Bay while on a voyage from Liverpool, Lancashire to London.
Nancy	United Kingdom	The ship ran aground on the West Bank, off New York, United States before 10 November. She was on a voyage from Liverpool to New York. She was refloated.
Neptune	United Kingdom	The ship was wrecked in Courtmasherry Bay. Her crew were rescued.
Nile	United Kingdom	The brig was driven ashore and wrecked at Spurn Point, Yorkshire with the loss of all hands. She was on a voyage from Danzig to London.
Polly	United Kingdom	The ship foundered in the Atlantic Ocean off Lisbon, Portugal. All on board weerre rescued by a Spanish vessel. She was on a voyage from Gibraltar to London.
Squirrel	United Kingdom	The ship was driven ashore at Dragør, Denmark. She was on a voyage from Stettin to London.
St Rosa	Spain	The ship was lost near Wilmington, North Carolina, United States in mid-November. She was on a voyage from Havana, Cuba to Bilbao.
Thetis	United Kingdom	The ship was driven ashore and wrecked at Trondheim, Norway.
Tyne	United Kingdom	The ship was driven ashore at Newcastle upon Tyne, Northumberland while bound from that port to Southampton, Hampshire.
Union	United Kingdom	The ship was wrecked on the Falsterbo Reef, off the coast of Sweden.
Union	United Kingdom	The ship was driven ashore near Grimsby, Lincolnshire with the loss of her captain. She was on a voyage from Saint Petersburg to London. Union was later refloated and taken in to Hull for repairs.
Unnamed	United Kingdom	Several vessels were driven ashore in Dundrum Bay.
Unnamed	Flag unknown	The ship foundered in the Baltic Sea 6 nautical miles (11 km) off Stolpemünde, Prussia with the loss of a crew member.

== December ==
=== 1 December ===
List of shipwrecks: 1 December 1804
Ship	State	Description
HMS Hawk	Royal Navy	The sloop-of-war parted company with the frigate HMS Boadicea (Royal Navy) in the English Channel to pursue a strange ship and was never seen or heard from again.

=== 3 December ===
List of shipwrecks: 3 December 1804
Ship	State	Description
Amadis	Stralsund	The yacht ran aground off the coast of Sweden. She was refloated and put back to Stralsund.
Industry	United Kingdom	The ship foundered in the North Sea off the mouth of the River Humber. Her crew were rescued. She was on a voyage from Grangemouth, Stirlingshire to London.

=== 5 December ===
List of shipwrecks: 5 December 1804
Ship	State	Description
Betsey	United Kingdom	The brig departed from St. John's, Newfoundland, British North America. No further trace, presumed foundered with the loss of all hands.

=== 6 December ===
List of shipwrecks: 6 December 1804
Ship	State	Description
HMS Morne Fortunee	Royal Navy	The brig was wrecked on Atwood's Key, Bahamas. All 53 crew were rescued by two American schooners.
Unnamed	Batavian Republic	The ship ran aground off Terschelling, Friesland. She was on a voyage from Saint Petersburg, Russia to Amsterdam, North Holland. She was refloated and taken in to West-Terschelling.

=== 8 December ===
List of shipwrecks: 8 December 1804
Ship	State	Description
Svyatoy Aleksandr (Святой Александр, 'St. Alexander')	Imperial Russian Navy	The brig was driven ashore and wrecked at the mouth of the Khobi, Mingrelia, after losing her anchors when the broken-off aft section of Tolskaya Bogoroditsa (see below) collided with her. Seven of her 78 crew were lost.
Tolskaya Bogoroditsa (Тольская Богородица, 'Theotokos of Tolga')	Imperial Russian Navy	The Svyatoi Pyotr-class ship of the line was driven ashore and wrecked at the mouth of the Khobi, Mingrelia, with the loss of 164 of her 263 crew. Her aft section broke off and precipitated the wrecking of Svyatoy Aleksandr (see above).
Unnamed	Royal Navy	War of the Third Coalition: The fireship was expended off Calai, France.

=== 10 December ===
List of shipwrecks: 10 December 1804
Ship	State	Description
Louisa Ulrika	Sweden	The ship ran aground at Chatham, Kent, United Kingdom. She was on a voyage from Sheerness, Kent to Chatham.

=== 11 December ===
List of shipwrecks: 11 December 1804
Ship	State	Description
Grace	United Kingdom	The ship was wrecked in Lagan Bay, Islay, Inner Hebrides. Her crew were rescued.
Unnamed	United Kingdom	The brigh was wrecked in Lagan Bay with the loss of all hands.

=== 12 December ===
List of shipwrecks: 12 December 1804
Ship	State	Description
Rover	United Kingdom	The transport ship was wrecked at Plymouth, Devon with the loss of three of her crew.

=== 13 December ===
List of shipwrecks: 13 December 1804
Ship	State	Description
Beaver or Rover	United Kingdom	The transport ship was wrecked at Yealm Point, Devon, England, with the loss of four or five lives.
Gustaf Adolph	Batavian Republic	The ship was driven ashore and wrecked on Eierland, North Holland.
Jane	United Kingdom	The ship sprang a leak and foundered in the North Sea off Whitby, Yorkshire with the loss of a crew member.

=== 14 December ===
List of shipwrecks: 14 December 1804
Ship	State	Description
Elizabeth	United Kingdom	The ship was driven ashore and wrecked 6 nautical miles (11 km) west of Boulogne, Pas-de-Calais, France. Her crew were rescued.
Fame	United Kingdom	The corvette, a captured French privateer, was driven ashore at Devil's Point, Plymouth. She was refloated.
Sarah	United Kingdom	The ship was driven ashore and wrecked 6 nautical miles (11 km) west of Boulogne with the loss of all but three of her crew.

=== 15 December ===
List of shipwrecks: 15 December 1804
Ship	State	Description
HM Hired armed schooner Gertrude	Royal Navy	The schooner was run down and sunk by the frigate HMS Aigle (Royal Navy), which rescued her crew.
Industry	United Kingdom	The ship was driven ashore at Easington, County Durham and was wrecked. Her crew were rescued. She was on a voyage from Grangemouth, Stirlingshire to London.
Magdelina	United Kingdom	The ship departed from Gijón, Spain for London. No further trace, presumed foundered with the loss of all hands.
Mary	United Kingdom	The ship was driven ashore on the Dutch coast. Her crew were rescued. She was on a voyage from Demerara to London.
Unnamed	Bremen	The ship ran aground near "Warsbergen". She was on a voyage from Riga, Russia to Bremen. She was refloated and taken in to "Warsbergen".

=== 17 December ===
List of shipwrecks: 17 December 1804
Ship	State	Description
Ann	United Kingdom	The ship foundered in the Atlantic Ocean off Madeira. Her crew survived. She was on a voyage from Liverpool, Lancashire to Africa.
Nelly	United Kingdom	The ship struck the North Sand Head, in The Downs and capsized. Her crew were rescued. She was on a voyage from Great Yarmouth, Norfolk to Gibraltar.
Venus	United Kingdom	The ship capsized in the English Channel east of the Isle of Wight with the loss of three of her crew. She was on a voyage from London to Guinea.

=== 18 December ===
List of shipwrecks: 18 December 1804
Ship	State	Description
Vrouw Peterke	Batavian Republic	The ship was driven ashore near Cuxhaven, Kingdom of Hanover. She was on a voyage from Hamburg to Amsterdam, North Holland.
Unnamed	Flag unknown	The ship was driven ashore near Minten, Kingdom of Hanover. She was on a voyage from Hamburg to Emden, Duchy of Schleswig.

=== 19 December ===
List of shipwrecks: 19 December 1804
Ship	State	Description
HMS Blonde	United Kingdom	The frigate was driven ashore and wrecked at Goodrington, Devon. All on board were rescued.
Endeavour	United Kingdom	The ship was driven ashore and wrecked at Weymouth, Dorset.
Fanny	United Kingdom	The ship was driven ashore near St. Ives, Cornwall. Her crew were rescued. She was on a voyage from Caernarfon to London.
HMS Malta	Royal Navy	The Tonnant-class ship of the line ran aground in Tor Bay. She was refloated.
Marengo	French Navy	The Téméraire-class ship of the line ran aground at Île Bourbon. She was refloated and taken in to Île Bourbon for repairs.
Pygmy	United Kingdom	The cutter was driven ashore on Guernsey, Channel Islands.
Unnamed	United Kingdom	The sloop was driven ashore and wrecked at Livermead, Devon. Her crew were rescued.
Unnamed	United Kingdom	The sloop was driven ashore and wrecked in Start Bay with the loss of all hands.

=== 20 December ===
List of shipwrecks: 20 December 1804
Ship	State	Description
Catherine	United Kingdom	The ship was driven ashore and wrecked at Howth, County Dublin with the loss of all hands.
Harmony	United States	The East Indiaman was driven ashore at Deal, Kent, United Kingdom, and wrecked. She was on a voyage from Sumatra. A small part of her cargo was saved.
Polly & Peggy	United Kingdom	The ship was lost whilst on a voyage from Antigua to Virginia, United States.
HMS Tartarus	Royal Navy	The bomb vessel was wrecked at Margate, Kent with the loss of a crew member.

=== 21 December ===
List of shipwrecks: 21 December 1804
Ship	State	Description
Mercator	United Kingdom	The ship was abandoned. She was on a voyage from Limerick t London.
Polly and Mary	United Kingdom	The ship foundered in Rosslare Bay. Her crew were rescued. She was on a voyage from Glasgow, Renfrewshire to Wexford,
HMS Severn	Royal Navy	The Adventure-class frigate was driven ashore and wrecked on Jersey, Channel Islands. Her crew were rescued.
Speculation	Sweden	The ship foundered in the English Channel off South Foreland, Kent, United Kingdom. Her crew were rescued. She was on a voyage from Uddevalla to Liverpool, Lancashire, United Kingdom.
HMS Thunderer	Royal Navy	The Culloden-class ship of the line ran aground off Bere Island, County Cork. She was refloated on 12 January 1805 and returned to service.

=== 22 December ===
List of shipwrecks: 22 December 1804
Ship	State	Description
Nelson	United Kingdom	The ship was driven ashore at Kinsale, County Cork. she was on a voyage from Demerara to Liverpool, Lancashire.
Neptune	United Kingdom	The ship was driven ashore and wrecked at Aveiro, Portugal. Her crew were rescued. She was on a voyage from London to Lisbon, Portugal.

=== 23 December ===
List of shipwrecks: 23 December 1804
Ship	State	Description
Die Jonge Lotte	Denmark-Norway	The ship was driven ashore near Bridlington, Yorkshire, United Kingdom and was wrecked. She was on a voyage from Helsingør to Lisbon, Portugal. The wreck was burnt on 27 December.
Union	United Kingdom	The brig was driven ashore and wrecked at Camden Fort, Crosshaven, County Cork. She was on a voyage from Bangor, Caernarfonshire to London.

=== 24 December ===
List of shipwrecks: 24 December 1804
Ship	State	Description
Alert	United States	The ship was lost near Boston, Massachusetts. She was on a voyage from Nantes, Loire-Inférieure, France to Boston.
Alexander I	Russia	The ship was holed by an anchor at Den Helder, North Holland, Batavian Republic and became severely leaky.
Charlotte	Courland Governorate	The ship was drive ashore. She was on a voyage from Ventspils to Rotterdam, South Holland, Batavian Republic. She was refloated and taken in to Harwich, Essex, United Kingdom.
Hero	United Kingdom	The ship was driven ashore and wrecked at Ayr. She was on a voyage from Quebec, British North America to Greenock, Renfrewshire.

=== 25 December ===
List of shipwrecks: 25 December 1804
Ship	State	Description
Endeavour	United Kingdom	The sloop was wrecked near Falmouth, Cornwall with the loss of all hands. She was on a voyage from Exeter, Devon to Falmouth.
HMS Starling	Royal Navy	War of the Third Coalition: The gun-brig ran aground off Calais, France and was set afire to prevent her capture by the French. Her crew survived.
Unnamed	Batavian Republic	The schuyt departed from Katwijk, South Holland for Cork, United Kingdom. No further trace, presumed foundered with the loss of all on board.

=== 27 December ===
List of shipwrecks: 27 December 1804
Ship	State	Description
Commerce	United Kingdom	The ship was driven ashore whilst on a voyage from Liverpool, Lancashire to New York, United States.
Commerce	United Kingdom	The transport ship was lost in Galway Bay. She was on a voyage from Plymouth, Devon to Limerick.
Elizabeth	United Kingdom	The ship was sighted off Beachy Head, Sussex whilst on a voyage from Dublin to London. No further trace, presumed foundered with the loss of all hands.
Familian	Denmark-Norway	The ship ren aground and was wrecked on the Stoney Binks, at the mouth of the Humber. Her crew were rescued by a pilot boat. She was on a voyage from Longsound to Hull, Yorkshire, United Kingdom.
Sarah	United Kingdom	The ship was sighted on Beachy Head whilst on a voyage from Dublin to London. No further trace, presumed foundered with the loss of all hands.
William	United Kingdom	War of the Third Coalition: The ship was captured by a French privateer. She was wrecked on the Colorados, off the coast of Cuba two days later. Her crew were rescued. William was on a voyage from Jamaica to London.

=== 29 December ===
List of shipwrecks: 29 December 1804
Ship	State	Description
Active	United Kingdom	The full-rigged ship was wrecked in the Isles of Scilly. Her crew were rescued.
Antelope	United States	The ship capsized off Calais, France. Her crew were rescued. She was on a voyage from Virginia to Dunkirk, Nord, France.
Rochdale	United Kingdom	The ship was driven ashore near Lowestoft, Suffolk. She was on a voyage from London to Selby, Yorkshire.
Padstow	United Kingdom	The brig was wrecked in the Isles of Scilly. She was on a voyage from Cardiff, Glamorgan to London.

=== 31 December ===
List of shipwrecks: 31 December 1804
Ship	State	Description
Wasanden or Wasa Orden	Sweden	The ship ran aground on the Cork Sand, in the Irish Sea and was wrecked. Her crew were rescued. She was on a voyage from Stockholm to Dublin, United Kingdom.

=== Unknown date ===
List of shipwrecks: Unknown date in December 1804
Ship	State	Description
Adler	(Denmark) Norway	The ship was driven ashore near Limerick, United Kingdom. She was on a voyage from Norway to Galway, United Kingdom.
Admiral Nelson	United Kingdom	The ship was driven ashore and wrecked at Salthouse, Norfolk. She was on a voyage from Copenhagen, Denmark to London.
Agenoria	United Kingdom	The ship was driven ashore near Grimsby, Lincolnshire. she was on a voyage from King's Lynn, Norfolk to Plymouth, Devon.
Anna Bella	United Kingdom	The ship was driven ashore at Liverpool, Lancashire. she was on a voyage from Jamaica to Liverpool.
Anne	United Kingdom	The ship departed from São Miguel Island, Azores for London. No further trace, presumed foundered with the loss of all hands.
Betsey	United Kingdom	The sloop departed from Dundee, Perthshire for Leith, Lothian. No further trace, presumed foundered in the North Sea with the loss of all hands.
Brothers	United Kingdom	The ship foundered in the Irish Sea off Beaumaris, Anglesey. She was on a voyage from Drogheda, County Louth to Liverpool.
Carl Ludwig	Austrian Empire	The ship was driven ashore near Venice. She was on a voyage from Padstow, Cornwall, United Kingdom to Venice.
Dædalus	United Kingdom	The ship was driven ashore near Königsburg, Prussia. She was on a voyage from London to Königsburg.
Flora	Portugal	The ship was wrecked on São Miguel Island, Azores.
Fortuna	Hamburg	The ship was driven ashore at Gravelines, Nord, France. She was on a voyage from Hamburg to Liverpool, Lancashire, United Kingdom.
Geode Speculant	Batavian Republic	The ship struck a sunken wreck off Bornholm, Denmark and was damaged. She was on a voyage from Libau, Courland Governorate to Schiedam, South Holland. She put in to Griefswald for repairs.
George	United Kingdom	The ship was driven ashore near Grimsby, Lincolnshire. She was on a voyage from Sunderland to London.
Grace	United Kingdom	The ship was wrecked in Loch Indaal. She was on a voyage from Limerick to Liverpool.
Hanbel	Prussia	The ship was driven ashore on Juist, Denmark and was wrecked. She was on a voyage from Copenhagen to Emden, Duchy of Schleswig.
HMS Hawk	Royal Navy	The Sloop-of-War was presumed to have foundered in the English Channel with the loss of all hands.
Jenny	United Kingdom	The ship foundered in the North Sea off Staithes, Yorkshire with the loss of a crew member.
Malvina	United Kingdom	The brig was wrecked on the China Rock, in The Nore. She was on a voyage from London to South Shields, County Durham.
Maryann	United Kingdom	The ship was wrecked in the Orkney Islands. She was on a voyage from "Wyburg" to Liverpool.
HMS Mignonne	Royal Navy	The Etna-class corvette ran aground at Port Royal, Jamaica and was declared a total loss.
Milnes	United Kingdom	The ship was driven ashore near Ramsgate, Kent. She was later refloated and taken in to Ramsgate.
Moreaux	Spain	The ship was driven ashore at Margate, Kent. She was on a voyage from Tenerife, Canary Islands to London.
Morning Star	United Kingdom	The ship ran aground on the North Bull, in the Irish Sea off the coast of County Dublin. Her crew were rescued by the Dublin Lifeboat. She was later refloated.
Neptune	United Kingdom	The ship was driven ashore at Ayr and was wrecked. She was on a voyage from Quebec City, Lower Canada, British North America to the Clyde.
Nova Alliance	United Kingdom	The ship departed from São Miguel Islands, Azores for London. No further trace, presumed foundered with the loss of all hands.
Pelican	United Kingdom	The schooner was wrecked at Falmouth, Cornwall.
Progress	United Kingdom	The ship was driven ashore on Saltholm, Denmark. She was on a voyage from Saint Petersburlater refloated.
Ranger	Denmark	The ship ran aground in The Swinebottoms, in the Baltic Sea. She was later refloated and taken in to Copenhagen.
HMS Severn	Royal Navy	The Adventure-class frigate was driven ashore and wrecked at Grouville, Jersey, Channel Islands. Her crew were rescued.
Skene	United Kingdom	The ship was driven ashore near Saltfleet, Lincolnshire. She was on a voyage from South Shields, County Durham to London.
Vrow Magdalena	Prussia	The ship was driven ashore near "Norden". She was on a voyage from London to Emben.
Zemeuco	Batavian Republic	The ship was driven ashore on "Eckholm", Russia. She was on a voyage from Saint Petersburg to Amsterdam. She was refloated and taken in to the Bay of Mainicowiort in a leaky condition.
Unnamed	Flag unknown	The brig foundered in the North Sea off Flamborough Head, Yorkshire with the loss of all hands.
Unnamed	Batavian Republic	The ship sank in the Gironde. She was on a voyage from Bordeaux, Gironde to the Maas.

== Unknown date ==
List of shipwrecks: Unknown date in 1804
Ship	State	Description
Abeona	United Kingdom	The ship was lost whilst on a voyage from Labrador to Quebec City, Lower Canada, British North America.
Active	United Kingdom	The ship was lost in the Bahamas. Her crew were rescued.
Atlas	United Kingdom	The ship was driven ashore on Cape Breton Island, Nova Scotia, British North America. She was on a voyage from Liverpool, Lancashire to Nova Scotia.
Calliope	United Kingdom	The ship was wrecked on the Florida Reef. She was on a voyage from Jamaica to Virginia, United States.
Catherine	United Kingdom	The ship foundered in the Gulf of Mexico. She was on a voyage from New Orleans, District of Louisiana to London.
Charlotte	United Kingdom	The ship was lost in the Cayman Islands. Her crew were rescued. She was on a voyage from Jamaica to Liverpool.
Clyde	United Kingdom	The merchant ship was lost during a voyage between the United Kingdom and China.
Constantine	United Kingdom	The ship was wrecked at Cape Antonio, at the mouth of the Río de la Plata. Her crew were rescued. She was on a voyage from Africa to the Río de la Plata.
Defiance	United Kingdom	The ship was driven ashore near Quebec City. She was on a voyage from Quebec City to Porto.
East Lothian	United Kingdom	The whaler was lost off Greenland. Her crew were rescued.
Echo	United Kingdom	The ship foundered off Jamaica.
Enterprize	United States	The brig was lost near Surinam.
Fanny	British East India Company	The ship was lost whilst on a voyage from Bombay, India to China.
Farmer	United Kingdom	The ship foundered whilst on a voyage from Jamaica to Philadelphia, Pennsylvania, United States.
Fortune	Prussia	The ship capsized in the Delaware River, United States. She was on a voyage from Emden, Duchy of Schleswig to Philadelphia.
Francizhena	Portugal	The ship was wrecked at Barbados while on a voyage from Brazil to Lisbon.
Friendship	United Kingdom	The ship foundered while on a voyage from Saint Kitts to London. Her crew were rescued by Gute Hanna (Flag unknown).
General Moore	United Kingdom	The ship was wrecked in the Mediterranean Sea. Her crew were rescued.
George	United Kingdom	The ship was driven ashore at Saint Thomas, Virgin Islands.
Hardy	United Kingdom	The ship a cartel, was lost near Havana. All on board were rescued. She was on a voyage from Jamaica to Bordeaux, Gironde, France.
Harriet	United States	The ship was dismasted and abandoned in the Atlantic Ocean. She was on a voyage from Demerara to New York.
Hercules	(United Kingdom of Great Britain and Ireland) Guernsey	The ship was lost near British Honduras. She was on a voyage from Guernsey to British Honduras.
James	(United Kingdom of Great Britain and Ireland) New South Wales	The ship was wrecked before 6 May.
Jeune Emilie	United Kingdom	War of the Third Coalition: The privateer was driven ashore on the coast of British Honduras in an action with a Royal Navy vessel. She was set afire by her crew to prevent capture.
Juno	United Netherlands Navy	The frigate foundered off Amboyna with the loss of a crew member. She was on a voyage from Batavia to Amboyna.
Lady Bruce	United Kingdom	The ship was lost in the Bay of Honduras. She was on a voyage from Jamaica to Greenock, Renfrewshire.
Lady Hobart	United Kingdom	The ship was wrecked on Heneaga with some loss of life.
Laurel	United States	The ship was driven ashore and wrecked at Salem, Massachusetts. She was on a voyage from Bengal, India to Salem.
Louisa	United Kingdom	The ship was wrecked on the coast of Africa. Her crew were rescued. She was on a voyage from Liverpool to Africa.
Lydia	United Kingdom	The ship was wrecked on the coast of North Carolina, United States while on a voyage from Wilmington, North Carolina to Falmouth, Cornwall.
Margaret	United Kingdom	The ship was lost 220 nautical miles (410 km) north east of Otaheite.
Mary Anne	United Kingdom	The ship was run down and sunk in the North Sea off Cromer, Norfolk.
Mary Ellen	United Kingdom	The ship was lost in the Bahamas Strait. She was on a voyage from Africa to Demerara and Havana, Cuba.
Mentor	United Kingdom	The ship was wrecked on the Main Reef. She was on a voyage from British Honduras to Jamaica.
Mercury	United Kingdom	The ship foundered in the Old Streights of Bahama. She was on a voyage from Africa to Havana, Cuba.
Mercury	(United Kingdom of Great Britain and Ireland) British North America	The ship was wrecked on Miquelon. She was on a voyage from Miramichi, New Brunswick to Newfoundland.
Messenger	United Kingdom	The ship was wrecked near Buenos Ayres, Viceroyalty of the Río de la Plata. She was on a voyage from Buenos Ayres to London.
Molly	United States	The brig was wrecked on the coast of Carolina.
Neptune	United States	The ship was lost in the Cayman Islands. Her crew were rescued. She was on a voyage from Jamaica to Baltimore, Maryland.
Nile	United Kingdom	The ship foundered off Saint Thomas while on a voyage from that island to Liverpool.
Peggy	United Kingdom	The ship foundered off Demerara while on a voyage from London to Demerara.
Protector	United States	The ship was lost at Cape Cod, Massachusetts. She was on a voyage from New York to Boston, Massachusetts and Lima, Viceroyalty of Peru.
Rambler	United States	The ship was run down and sunk off Newfoundland, British North America by Ulysses (United Kingdom). Rambler was on a voyage from Boston, Massachusetts to Rotterdam, South Holland, Batavian Republic.
Samuel Smith	United States	The ship was wrecked on the Virginia Capes. She was on a voyage from Batavia, Dutch East Indies to the United States.
San Demetrio di Rostovi	Ottoman Empire	The ship foundered in the Black Sea.
Spartan	United Kingdom	The ship was wrecked at Cape Cod. She was on a voyage from the Jade to Boston, Massachusetts.
Surprize	United States	The ship was lost off Bermuda. She was on a voyage from the Cape of Good Hope to Philadelphia.
Surprize	United Kingdom	The brig was lost near Grenada. She was on a voyage from Grenada to Trinidada.
Sv. Olga	Russia	The single-masted, single-deck vessel was wrecked at Yakutat in Russian Alaska. The Russian-American Company′s first governor of Russian America, Alexander Andreyevich Baranov, later had her wreck destroyed by cannon fire to celebrate peace with the Alaska Natives.
Two Brothers	United Kingdom	The ship foundered in the Atlantic Ocean off Cape Breton Island, British North America, She was on a voyage from Liverpool, Lancashire to Pictou.
Two Sisters	United Kingdom	The ship was wrecked near Whitford Point, Glamorgan.
Union	United Kingdom	The ship was wrecked on "La Bradne". Her crew were rescued. She was on a voyage from Quebec City to the Clyde.
Urania	United Kingdom	War of the Third Coalition: The slave ship was severely damaged in an engagement with a French privateer. She was on a voyage from Africa to Demerara. Urania was reported as likely to be condemned due to damage sustained.
Warren Hastings	United Kingdom	The ship was wrecked in the Hooghly River with loss of life.
William	United Kingdom	The ship was lost on a voyage from New York, United States to British Honduras.
William	United States	The ship was lost near Sandy Hook, New Jersey.
Young William	United Kingdom	The Guineaman foundered in the Irish Sea 2 nautical miles (3.7 km) off the coast of Anglesey.
