= The Capture of the El Gamo =

1845 painting by Clarkson Frederick Stanfield

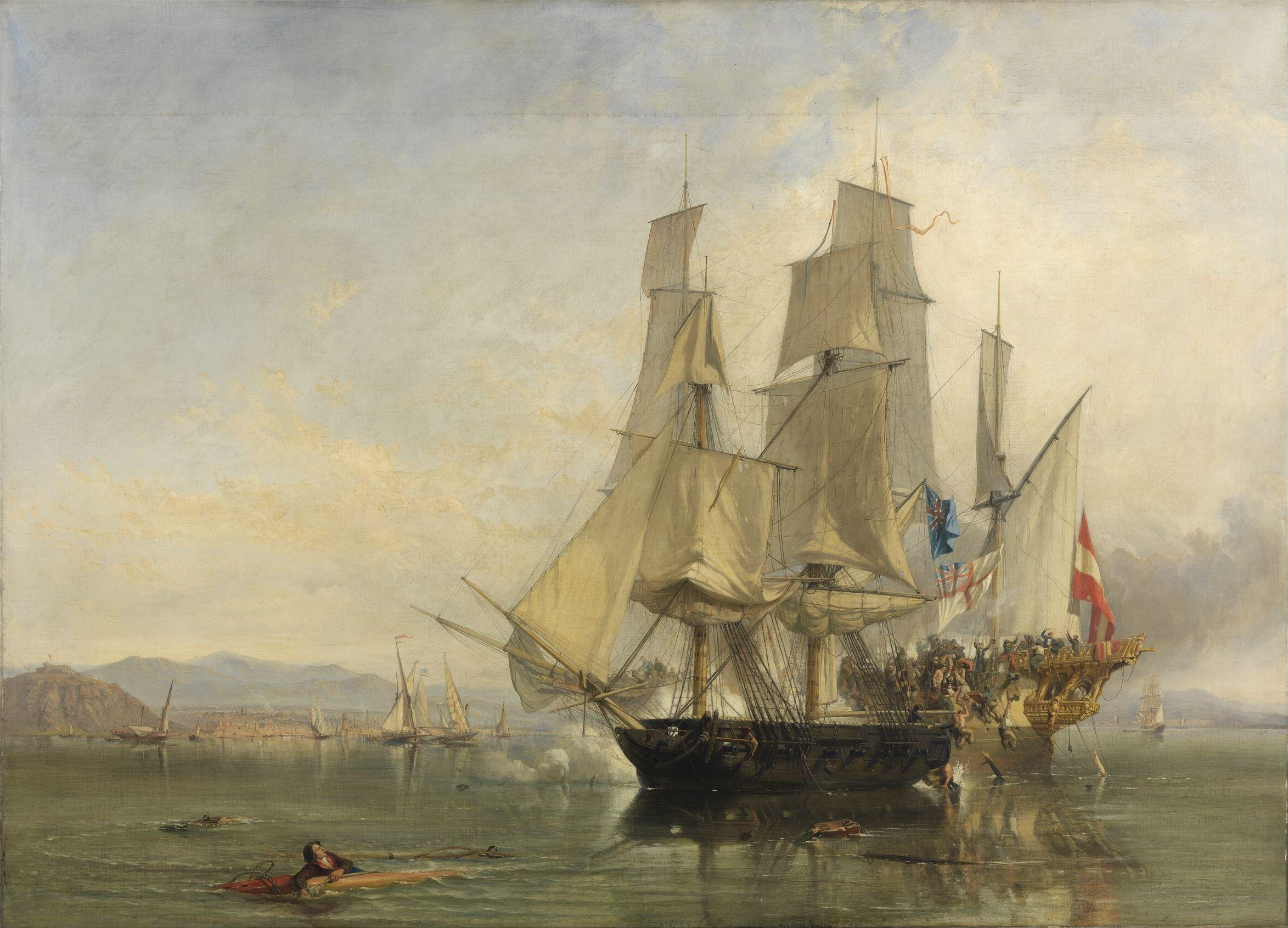
- Artist: Clarkson Stanfield
- Year: 1845
- Medium: Oil on canvas, marine painting
- Dimensions: 132.1 cm × 183.9 cm (52.0 in × 72.4 in)
- Location: Victoria and Albert Museum, London

The Capture of the El Gamo is an 1845 oil painting by the English painter Clarkson Frederick Stanfield. Combining marine art and history painting, it depicts the action of 6 May 1801, which was fought between the British brig-sloop HMS Speedy and the Spanish xebec-frigate El Gamo off Barcelona during the War of the Second Coalition. Despite being much weaker in terms of her size, crew and firepower, Speedy captured El Gamo. The battle boosted the reputation of Speedy's young commander, Lord Cochrane.

Stanfield was a former sailor who specialised in marine art, having painted The Battle of Trafalgar in 1836. The work was commissioned by Commander Charles Spencer Ricketts, who had served in the battle, and was displayed at the Royal Academy of Arts' Summer Exhibition of 1845 at the National Gallery. The painting is currently in the collections of the Victoria and Albert Museum, which acquired it in 1901.

== Bibliography ==
- Cordingly, David. Cochrane the Dauntless: The Life and Adventures of Thomas Cochrane, 1775-1860. Bloomsbury Publishing, 2013.
- Isham, Howard F. Image of the Sea: Oceanic Consciousness in the Romantic Century. Peter Lang, 2004.
- Parkinson, Ronald. Catalogue of British Oil Paintings 1820-1860. Victoria and Albert Museum, 1990.
- Roe, Sonia. Oil Paintings in Public Ownership in the Victoria and Albert Museum. Public Catalogue Foundation, 2008.
- Tomlinson, Barbara. Commemorating the Seafarer: Monuments, Memorials and Memory. Boydell Press, 2015.
- Van der Merwe, Pieter & Took, Roger. The Spectacular career of Clarkson Stanfield. Tyne and Wear County Council Museums, 1979.
