= 1801 =

1801 in various calendars
- Gregorian calendar: 1801; MDCCCI
- French Republican calendar: 9–10; IX–X
- Ab urbe condita: 2554
- Armenian calendar: 1250; ԹՎ ՌՄԾ
- Assyrian calendar: 6551
- Balinese saka calendar: 1722–1723
- Bengali calendar: 1207–1208
- Berber calendar: 2751
- British Regnal year: 41 Geo. 3 – 42 Geo. 3
- Buddhist calendar: 2345
- Burmese calendar: 1163
- Byzantine calendar: 7309–7310
- Chinese calendar: 庚申年 (Metal Monkey); 4498 or 4291 — to — 辛酉年 (Metal Rooster); 4499 or 4292
- Coptic calendar: 1517–1518
- Discordian calendar: 2967
- Ethiopian calendar: 1793–1794
- Hebrew calendar: 5561–5562
- Hindu calendars
- Vikram Samvat: 1857–1858
- Shaka Samvat: 1722–1723
- Kali Yuga: 4901–4902
- Holocene calendar: 11801
- Igbo calendar: 801–802
- Iranian calendar: 1179–1180
- Islamic calendar: 1215–1216
- Japanese calendar: Kansei 13 (寛政１３年)
- Javanese calendar: 1727–1728
- Julian calendar: Gregorian minus 12 days
- Korean calendar: 4134
- Minguo calendar: 111 before ROC 民前111年
- Nanakshahi calendar: 333
- Thai solar calendar: 2343–2344
- Tibetan calendar: ལྕགས་ཕོ་སྤྲེ་ལོ་ (male Iron-Monkey); 1927 or 1546 or 774 — to — ལྕགས་མོ་བྱ་ལོ་ (female Iron-Bird); 1928 or 1547 or 775

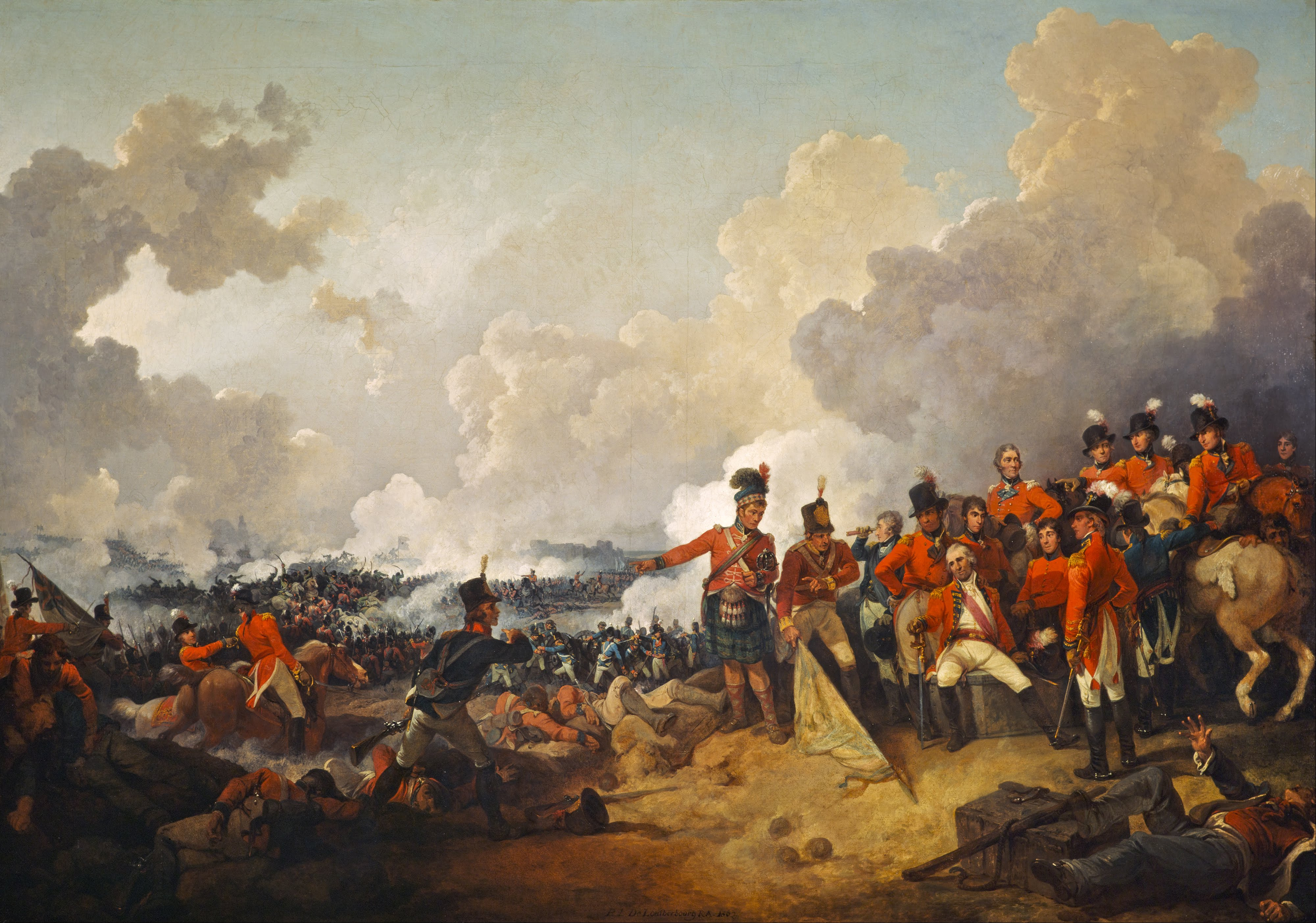
March 21: Battle of Alexandria. Depicted in Philip James de Loutherbourg's The Battle of Alexandria.

1801 (MDCCCI) was a common year starting on Thursday of the Gregorian calendar and a common year starting on Tuesday of the Julian calendar, the 1801st year of the Common Era (CE) and Anno Domini (AD) designations, the 801st year of the 2nd millennium, the 1st year of the 19th century, and the 2nd year of the 1800s decade. As of the start of 1801, the Gregorian calendar was 12 days ahead of the Julian calendar, which remained in localized use until 1923.

== Events ==
=== January–March ===
January 1: The United Kingdom of Great Britain and Ireland is formed.

- January 1
  - The legislative union of Great Britain and Ireland is completed under the Act of Union 1800, bringing about the United Kingdom of Great Britain and Ireland, and the abolition of the Parliament of Ireland.
  - Giuseppe Piazzi discovers the asteroid and dwarf planet Ceres.
- January 3 – Toussaint Louverture triumphantly enters Santo Domingo, the capital of the former Spanish colony of Santo Domingo, which has become a colony of Napoleonic France.
- January 31 – John Marshall is appointed Chief Justice of the United States.
- February 4 – William Pitt the Younger resigns as Prime Minister of the United Kingdom.
- February 9 – The Treaty of Lunéville ends the War of the Second Coalition between France and Austria. Under the terms of the treaty, all German territories left of the Rhine are officially annexed by France while Austria also has to recognize the Batavian, Helvetian, Cisalpine and Ligurian Republics.
- February 17 – An electoral tie between Thomas Jefferson and Aaron Burr is resolved, when Jefferson is elected President of the United States and Burr Vice President by the United States House of Representatives.
- February 27 – Washington, D.C. is placed under the jurisdiction of the United States Congress.
- March 10 – The first census is held in Great Britain. The population of England and Wales is determined to be 8.9 million, with London revealed to have 860,035 residents. 1.5 million people live in cities of 20,000 or more in England and Wales, accounting for 17% of the total English population.
- March 14 – Henry Addington becomes First Lord of the Treasury and Chancellor of the Exchequer, effectively Prime Minister of the United Kingdom.
- March 21 – Battle of Alexandria in Egypt: British troops defeat the French, but the British commander, Sir Ralph Abercromby, dies later of a wound received in the action.
- March 23 – Tsar Paul I of Russia is murdered; he is succeeded by his son Alexander I.

=== April–June ===
- April 2 – War of the Second Coalition: First Battle of Copenhagen – The British Royal Navy, under Admiral Sir Hyde Parker, forces the Royal Dano-Norwegian Navy to accept an armistice. Vice-Admiral Horatio Nelson leads the main attack, deliberately disregarding his commander's signal to withdraw. He is created a Viscount on May 19; Denmark-Norway is forced to withdraw from the Second League of Armed Neutrality.
- April 21 – Ranjit Singh is invested as Maharaja of Punjab.
- May 6 – French Revolutionary Wars: Action of 6 May 1801 off Barcelona – British Royal Navy brig HMS Speedy, although outmanned and outgunned, captures the 32-gun Spanish frigate El Gamo.
- May 10 – The pascha of Tripoli declares war on the United States, by having the flagpole on the consulate chopped down.
- June 7 – War of the Oranges ends: Portugal and Spain sign the Treaty of Badajoz; Portugal loses the city of Olivenza.
- June 15 – A bull breaks through barriers at a bullfight in Madrid, killing two people (including the mayor of Torrejón de Ardoz) and injuring a number of other spectators.
- June 27 – Siege of Cairo ends: Cairo falls to British troops.

=== July–September ===
- July 6 – First Battle of Algeciras: The French fleet defeats the British fleet.
- July 7 – Toussaint Louverture promulgates a reforming constitution for Santo Domingo, declaring himself emperor for life of the entire island of Hispaniola, and nominally abolishing slavery.
- July 12 – Second Battle of Algeciras: The British fleet defeats the French and Spanish fleets.
- July 18 – Napoleon signs a Concordat with Pope Pius VII.
- August 1 – First Barbary War: Action of 1 August 1801 – United States Navy schooner USS Enterprise (1799) captures the 14-gun Tripolitan corsair polacca Tripoli off the north African coast, in a single-ship action.
- September 2 - Siege of Alexandria: French troops (some 10,000 men) under General Jacques-François Menou surrender to the British after a siege of 17 days. According to the terms, the French are allowed to keep their personal weapons and baggage.
- September 9 – Alexander I of Russia confirms the privileges of the Baltic provinces.
- September 24 – Joseph Marie Jacquard exhibits his new invention, a loom where the pattern being woven is controlled by punched cards, at the National Exposition in Paris.
- September 30 – The Treaty of London is signed for preliminary peace between the French First Republic and the United Kingdom of Great Britain and Ireland.

=== October–December ===
- October 17 – A coup d'état is staged in the Batavian Republic.
- November 16 – The first edition of the New-York Evening Post is printed.
- December 15 – Hadži Mustafa Pasha, Ottoman commander and politician, is assassinated in Belgrade, Sanjak of Smederevo, by Kučuk-Alija.
- December 19 – South Carolina College, a precursor to The University of South Carolina, is established in Columbia, South Carolina.
- December 24 – Cornish engineers Richard Trevithick and Andrew Vivian demonstrate "Puffing Devil", their steam-powered road locomotive, in Camborne. The trial is successful but Trevithick realizes the limitations of steam power in a road-running vehicle and turns his attention to rail, introducing the world's first steam railway locomotive in 1804.

=== Date unknown ===
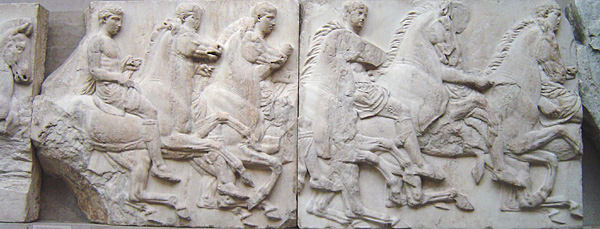
The Elgin Marbles are removed from the Parthenon.

- The first of a continuous series of censuses is held in France.
- Thomas Bruce, 7th Earl of Elgin, British ambassador to the Ottoman Empire, begins removal of the Elgin Marbles from the Parthenon in Athens.
- Philippe Pinel publishes Traité médico-philosophique sur l'aliénation mentale; ou la manie, presenting his enlightened humane psychological approach to the management of psychiatric hospitals. Translated into English by D. D. Davis as Treatise on Insanity in 1806, it is influential on both sides of the Atlantic during the nineteenth century.
- Ultraviolet radiation is discovered by Johann Wilhelm Ritter.
- The magnum opus Disquisitiones Arithmeticae of Carl Friedrich Gauss is published.
- The Supreme Council, Scottish Rite (Southern Jurisdiction, USA) is founded within Freemasonry.

== Births ==
=== January–June ===
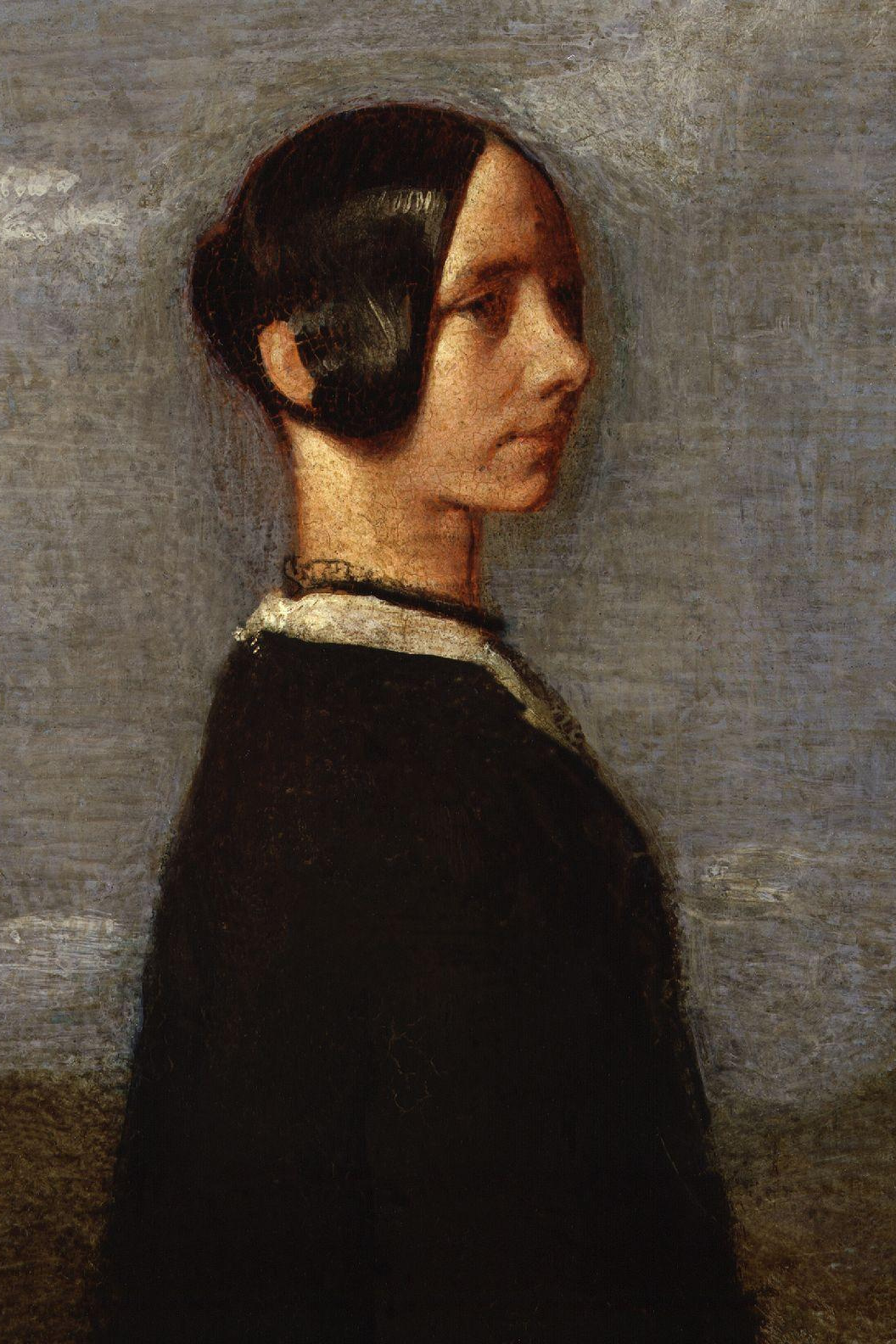
Jane Welsh Carlyle

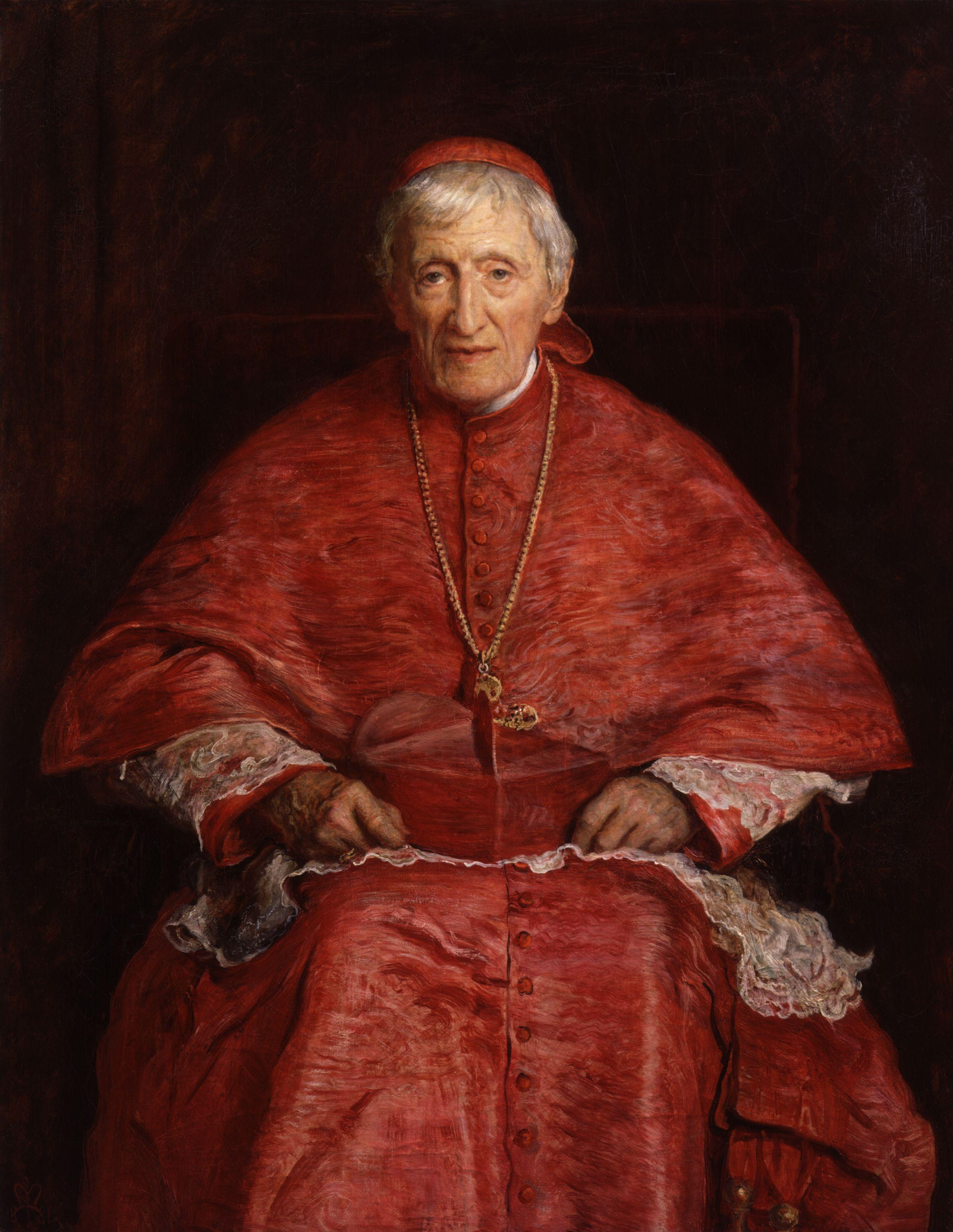
John Henry Newman

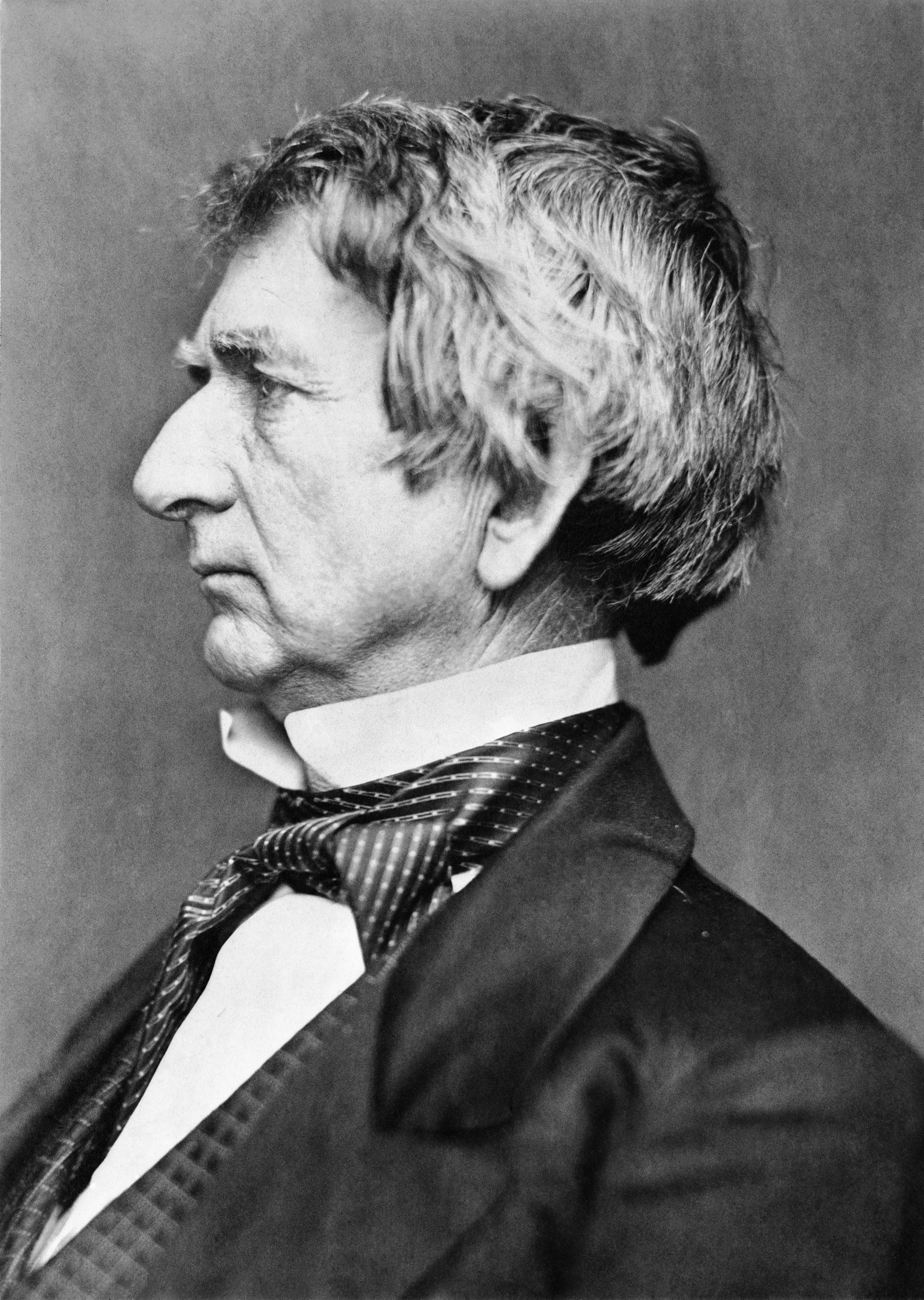
William H. Seward

- January 3 – Gijsbert Haan, Dutch-American religious leader (d. 1874)
- January 10 – Thierry Hermès, German-born French businessman, founder of Hermès (d. 1878)
- January 11 – Honório Hermeto Carneiro Leão, Marquis of Paraná, Brazilian politician (d. 1856)
- January 14 – Jane Welsh Carlyle, Scottish writer, wife of Thomas Carlyle (d. 1866)
- February 1
  - Jean-Baptiste Boussingault, French chemist (d. 1887)
  - Thomas Cole, American artist (d. 1848)
- February 21 – John Henry Newman, English cardinal (d. 1890)
- March 15 – George Perkins Marsh, American diplomat, philologist and pioneer environmentalist (d. 1882)
- May 5 – Pío Pico, last Governor of Alta California (d. 1894)
- May 11 – Henri Labrouste, French architect (d. 1875)
- May 16 – William H. Seward, 24th United States Secretary of State (d. 1872)
- May 17 – Lovisa Åhrberg, first woman doctor, surgeon in Sweden (d. 1881)
- June 1 – Brigham Young, American Mormon leader, colonizer (d. 1877)
- June 5 – William Scamp, English architect and engineer (d. 1872)
- June 4 – James Pennethorne, English architect (d. 1871)
- June 14 – Heber C. Kimball, American religious leader (d. 1868)
- June 16 – Julius Plücker, German mathematician, physicist (d. 1868)
- June 30 – Frédéric Bastiat, French philosopher (d. 1850)

=== July–December ===
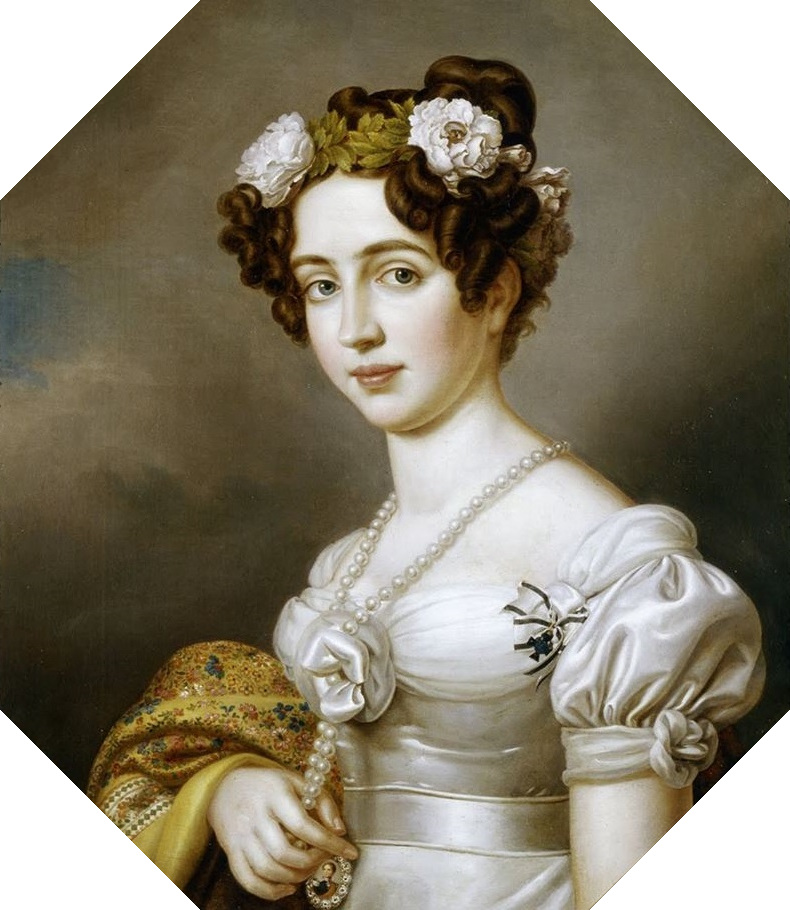
Elisabeth Ludovika of Bavaria

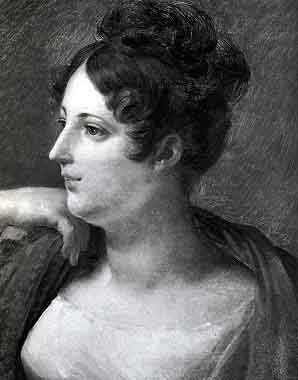
Hortense Allart

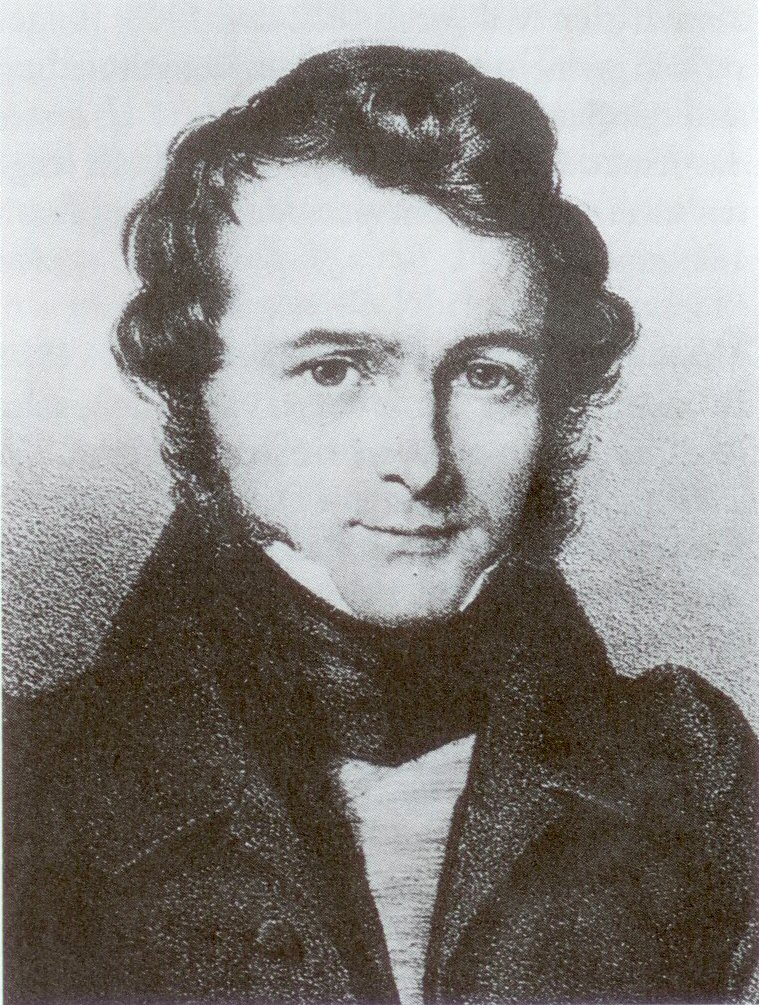
Christian Erich Hermann von Meyer

- July 5 – David Farragut, American admiral (d. 1870)
- July 14 – Johannes Peter Müller, German physiologist, comparative anatomist, ichthyologist, and herpetologist (d. 1858)
- July 27 – George Biddell Airy, English mathematician, astronomer (d. 1892)
- September 1 – Hortense Allart, French writer (d. 1879)
- September 3 – Christian Erich Hermann von Meyer, German palaeontologist (d. 1869)
- October 12
  - Friedrich Frey-Herosé, member of the Swiss Federal Council (d. 1873)
  - Carl August von Steinheil, German engineer, astronomer (d. 1870)
- October 23 – Albert Lortzing, German composer (d. 1851)
- November 3
  - Karl Baedeker, German author, publisher (d. 1859)
  - Vincenzo Bellini, Italian composer (d. 1835)
- November 10 – Vladimir Dal, Russian lexicographer (d. 1872)
- November 13 – Queen Elisabeth Ludovika of Bavaria, queen of Prussia (d. 1873)
- December 11 – Christian Dietrich Grabbe, German writer (d. 1836)
- December 14 – Joseph Lane, American politician and general, 1st Governor of Oregon (d. 1881)

=== Date unknown ===
- Dai Xi, Chinese painter (d. 1860)
- Brita Sofia Hesselius, Swedish photographer (d. 1866)

== Deaths ==
=== January–June ===
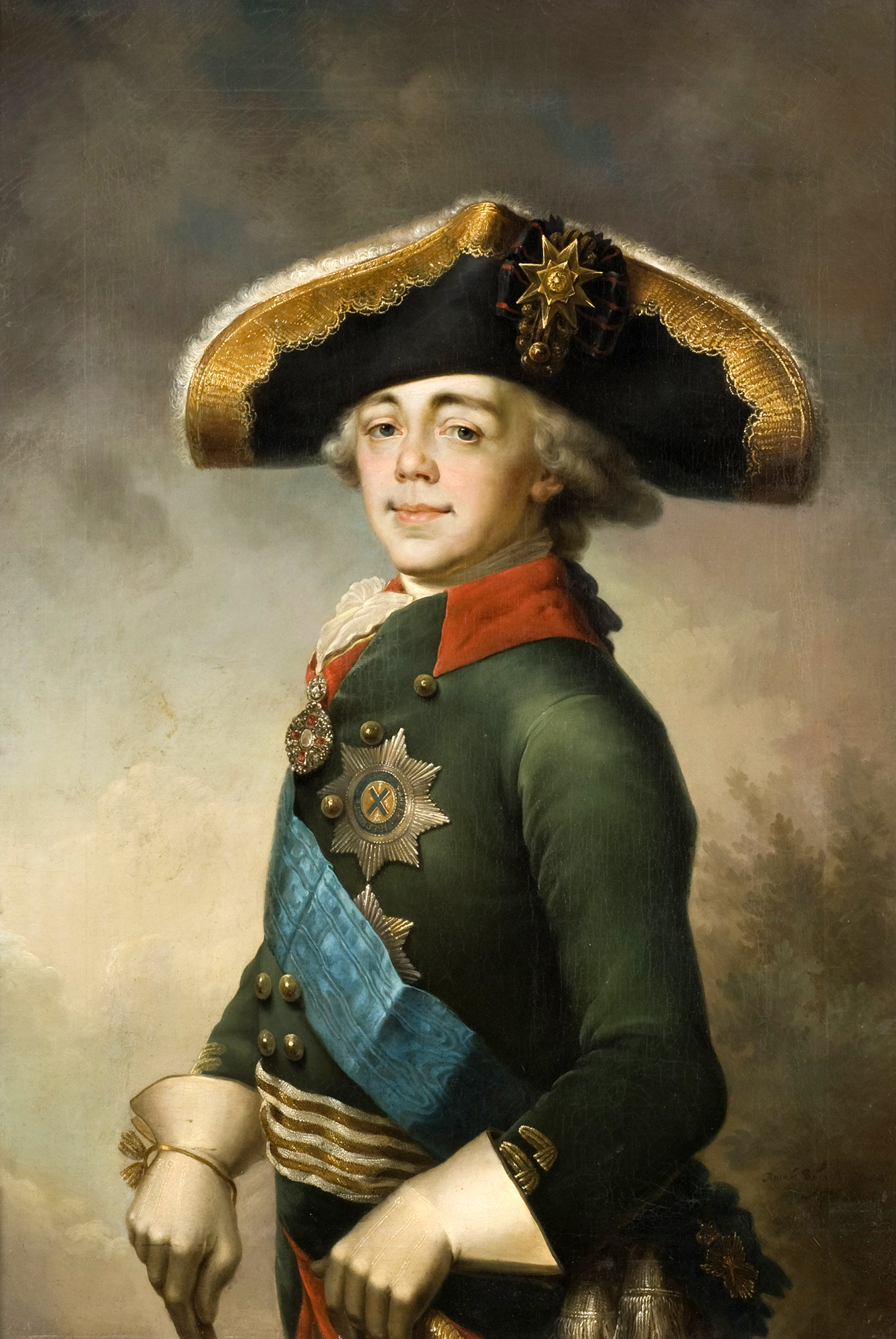
Paul I of Russia

- January 2 – Johann Kaspar Lavater, Swiss physiognomist (b. 1741)
- January 11 – Domenico Cimarosa, Italian composer (b. 1749)
- February 7 – Daniel Chodowiecki, Polish painter (b. 1726)
- February 17 – Princess Philippine Charlotte of Prussia (b. 1716)
- March 14 – Margarita "Peggy" Schuyler Van Rensselaer, American socialite, Angelica Schuyler Church's sister (b. 1758)
- March 16 – Grand Duchess Alexandra Pavlovna of Russia, daughter of Paul I of Russia (b.1783)
- March 19 – Ambrosio O'Higgins, 1st Marquis of Osorno, Spanish viceroy of Peru and Governor of the Captaincy General of Chile, father of Bernardo O'Higgins, (b. c. 1720)
- March 21 – Andrea Luchesi, Italian composer (b. 1741)
- March 23 – Tsar Paul I of Russia (b. 1754)
- March 25 – Novalis, German poet (b. 1772)
- March 28 – Ralph Abercromby, British general (b. 1734)
- April 2 – Thomas Dadford, Jr., British engineer (b. ca. 1761)
- April 7 – Noël François de Wailly, French lexicographer (b. 1724)
- May 3 – Cyrus Trapaud, British Army general (b. 1715)
- May 17 – William Heberden, English physician (b. 1710)
- June 4 – Frederick Muhlenberg, first Speaker of the U.S. House of Representatives (b. 1750)
- June 14 – Benedict Arnold, American Revolution hero, then traitor (b. 1741)

=== July–December ===
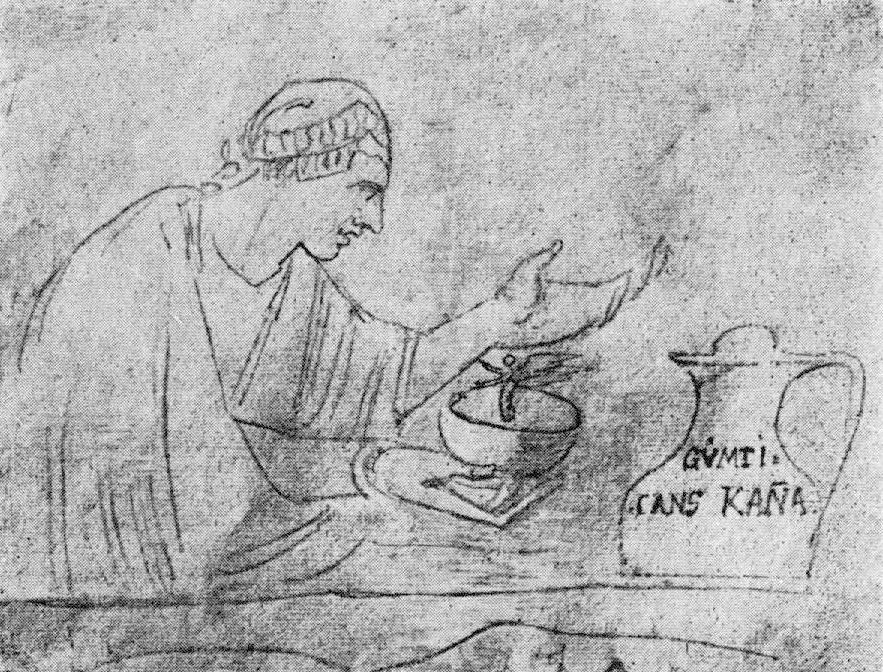
Ulrica Arfvidsson

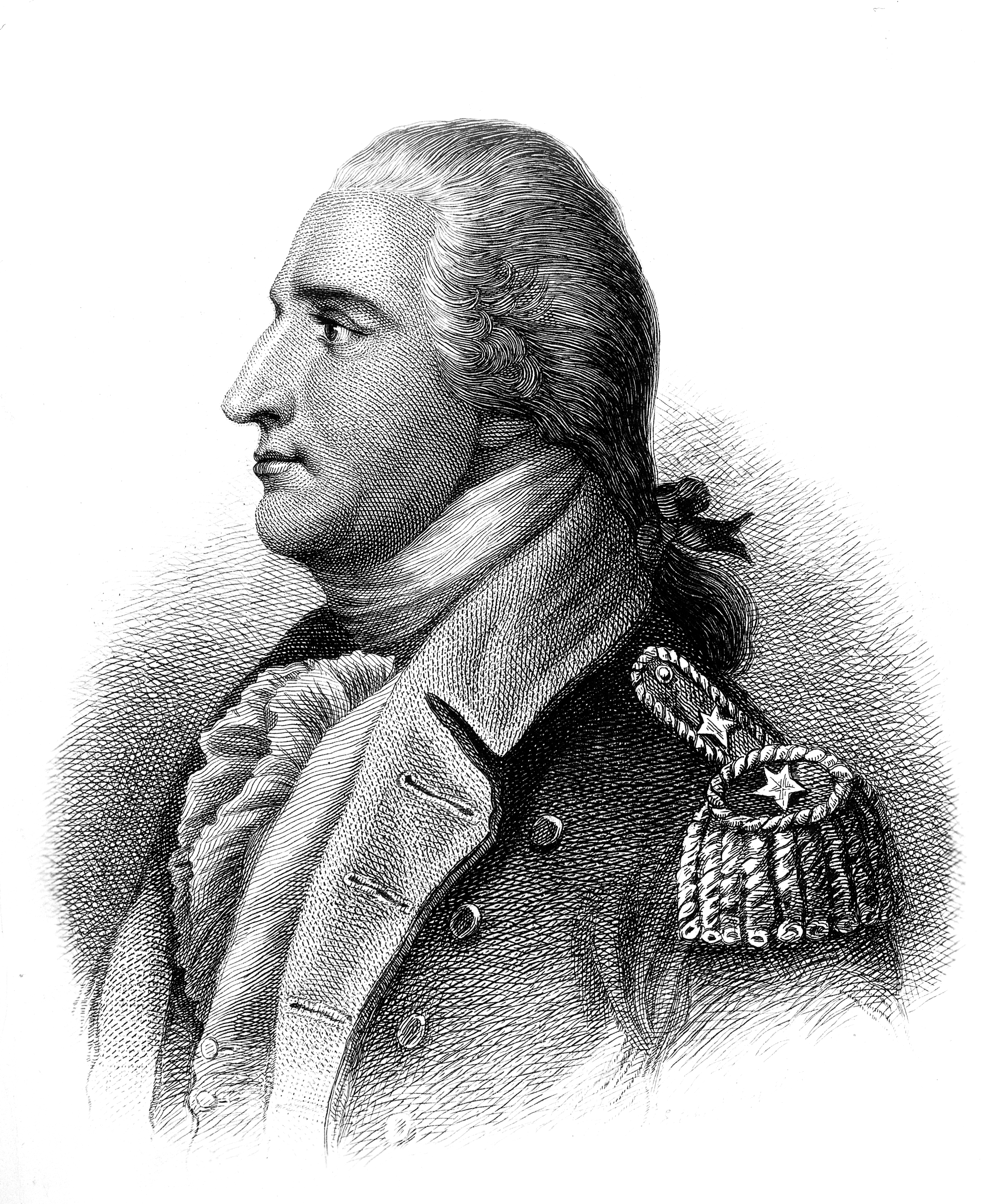
Benedict Arnold

- July 4 – Leendert Viervant the Younger, Dutch architect (b. 1752)
- August 13 – George Gordon, 3rd Earl of Aberdeen (b. 1722)
- August 31 – Nicola Sala, Italian opera composer (b. 1713)
- September 19 – Johann Gottfried Koehler, German astronomer (b. 1745)
- October 3 – Philippe Henri, marquis de Ségur, Marshal of France (b. 1724)
- November 4 – William Shippen, American physician, Continental Congressman (b. 1712)
- November 5
  - Humphry Marshall, American botanist (b. 1722)
  - Motoori Norinaga, Japanese philologist and scholar (b. 1730)
- November 24
  - Franz Moritz von Lacy, Austrian field marshal (b. 1725)
  - Philip Hamilton, son of American soldier and statesman, Alexander Hamilton (b. 1782)

=== Date unknown ===
- Ulrica Arfvidsson, Swedish fortune teller (b. 1734)
- Frances Williams, Welsh convict (b. c. 1760)
