= Master and Commander =

1969 novel by Patrick O'Brian

- First US edition (Lippincott, 1969)
- Author: Patrick O'Brian
- Language: English
- Series: Aubrey–Maturin series
- Genre: Historical novel, sea novel
- Set in: 18 April 1800 – mid 1801
- Publisher: Lippincott (US), Collins (UK)
- Publication date: 1969 (US), 1970 (UK)
- Media type: Print
- Pages: 384 (US), 350 (UK)
- ISBN: 0-00-221526-8 First edition, Collins
- OCLC: 31728441
- Followed by: Post Captain

Master and Commander is a nautical historical novel by the English author Patrick O'Brian, first published in 1969 in the US and 1970 in the UK. The book proved to be the start of the 20-novel Aubrey–Maturin series, set largely in the era of the Napoleonic Wars, on which O'Brian continued working until his death in 2000.

The novel is set at the turn of the 19th century. It focuses on two characters: the young Jack Aubrey, a Royal Navy lieutenant who has just been promoted to the rank of Master and Commander, effectively a captain, and Stephen Maturin, a destitute physician and naturalist whom Aubrey appoints as his naval surgeon. They sail in HM sloop-of-war Sophie with first lieutenant James Dillon, a wealthy and aristocratic Irishman. The naval action in the Mediterranean is closely based on the real-life exploits of Lord Cochrane, including a battle modelled after Cochrane's spectacular victory in the brig HMS Speedy over the vastly superior Spanish frigate El Gamo.

Master and Commander met with mixed reviews on its first publication. Although UK sales were respectable enough for O'Brian to continue with the series, it was not initially a success in the US. In Britain and Ireland, however, voices of praise gradually became dominant. The novel has been lauded for having "a brilliant sense of period," and for O'Brian's "easy command of the philosophical, political, sensual and social temper of the times [that] flavors a rich entertainment," putting the reader into the times in every aspect, from exceptional detail on the practices of the Royal Navy on sailing ships to the states of science, medicine, and society during the Napoleonic era.

In 1990, the US publisher W. W. Norton & Company re-issued the book and its sequels, which was an almost immediate success and drew O'Brian a new and large readership. O'Brian's biographer has placed the novel at the start of what he called the author's magnum opus, a series that has become perhaps the best-loved book series of the 20th century.

== Setting ==
The novel opens on 18 April 1800 and covers the period until mid 1801, the action being portrayed within the historical setting of War of the Second Coalition, one phase in Britain's long and continuing war against the French following Nelson's victories in the Mediterranean, including the British victory at the 1798 Battle of the Nile. Events in the novel also largely take place in the Mediterranean, with the French, British, and Spanish navies attempting to capture and disrupt the merchant shipping of their enemies.

A significant subplot of the novel concerns the divided loyalties of two Irishmen, Dillon and Maturin, following their involvement in the unsuccessful Irish Rebellion of 1798. Ireland was then under the domination of the Protestant Ascendancy, and political dissent in the country had been increasing for some time. Irish Protestants bemoaned the lack of an effective political voice and the fact that much of the best agricultural land was held by absentee landlords, while Irish Catholics, who formed the majority of the population, were excluded from political participation and respectable professions. The United Irishmen was formed in the late 18th century to tackle these grievances, leading ultimately to rebellion. In the rebellion's aftermath many disaffected Irishmen (such as Maturin in the novel) had left the island to seek their fortunes elsewhere.

== Plot ==
The novel opens in April 1800. Jack Aubrey, a shipless lieutenant wasting away in the Royal Navy port of Mahon in Minorca, meets Stephen Maturin, a destitute Irish-Catalan physician and natural philosopher, at a concert at the Governor's Mansion. During the performance, Maturin elbows Aubrey who is beating the measure "half a beat ahead". The men, both at personal low points, treat the matter as one of honour; they exchange names and anticipate a duel.

Later that evening, Aubrey learns that he has been promoted to the rank of commander and has been given command of the 14-gun sloop-of-war HMS Sophie. Meeting Maturin in the street the next day, Aubrey's joy overcomes his animosity and he invites Maturin to dine. The men discover a shared love of music, Aubrey playing the violin and Maturin the cello. On learning Maturin's profession, Aubrey asks him to join his ship. Although as a physician Maturin's expertise goes far beyond that normally expected of a naval surgeon, he agrees.

Sophie is sent to accompany a small convoy of merchant ships in the Mediterranean. Aubrey takes the opportunity to get to know his sailors and work them into a fighting unit with the aid of his new first lieutenant, James Dillon, a wealthy and aristocratic Irishman. Dillon and Maturin recognize each other, having previously met (a fact they keep to themselves) as members of the United Irishmen, a society dedicated to Irish home rule and Catholic emancipation. Dillon suffers a crisis of conscience when ordered to intercept an American ship thought to be harbouring Irish rebels, and he works to help them avoid capture.

Maturin, who has never been aboard a man-of-war, struggles to understand nautical customs, and the crew explain to him (and to the reader) naval terminology and the official practice whereby prize money can be awarded for captured enemy vessels. Maturin is treated by the crew as a landsman, though without offence. As a natural philosopher he relishes the opportunity to study rare birds and fish.

His convoy duties complete, Aubrey is permitted by Admiral Lord Keith to cruise the Mediterranean independently, looking to capture French and Spanish merchant vessels, at which he is very successful, taking many prizes. Sophie meets and defeats the much larger and better-armed Cacafuego, a Spanish 32-gun xebec-frigate, though a number of the crew, including Dillon, die in the bloody action. A victory against such odds would normally bring official recognition, promotion, and significant prize money, but Captain Harte, his superior at Mahon, has a grudge against Aubrey, who has been having an affair with his wife. While Harte ensures that Aubrey receives none of those things, he cannot prevent Aubrey gaining a reputation within the Royal Navy as one of its great, young fighting captains.

On escort duty, Sophie is captured by a squadron of four large French warships, and the crew is taken prisoner. The French Captain Christy-Pallière is courteous; he feeds Aubrey well and tells him of his own cousins in Bath. During the crew's confinement, the French are attacked by a British squadron in what becomes the First Battle of Algeciras. Several days later the officers are paroled to Gibraltar from where they are able to witness from afar the second battle. Aubrey faces a court-martial for the loss of his ship and is acquitted.

== Principal characters ==
- Jack Aubrey: Royal Navy lieutenant, newly appointed Master and Commander of Sophie.
- Stephen Maturin: Irish-Catalan physician, natural philosopher and musician, taken on as surgeon of Sophie.
- Captain Harte: Station commandant at Port Mahon.
- Molly Harte: Wife of the station commandant, lover of Aubrey.
- Lord Keith: Admiral in the Mediterranean, recently married to Queeney.
- Queeney: Wife of Lord Keith, in earlier days neighbour and tutor to the young Jack Aubrey.
- William Marshall: Master in Sophie.
- Tom Pullings: Master's mate in Sophie.
- William Mowett: Master's mate in Sophie.
- Barret Bonden: Coxswain and captain of the maintop in Sophie.
- Preserved Killick: Aubrey's personal steward
- Mr William Babbington: Midshipman in Sophie.
- Mr James Dillon: First lieutenant in Sophie.
- Captain Heneage Dundas: Captain of the sloop Calpe and friend of Aubrey.
- Captain Christy-Pallière: Captain of the French ship Desaix.
- Admiral Sir James Saumarez: Rear Admiral of the squadron that succeeds in the Algeciras Campaign.

== Ships ==
- British
  - HM Sloop Sophie – 14 gun brig sloop, modelled by O'Brian on Thomas Cochrane's HMS Speedy
  - HMS Audacious – ship of the line and flagship
  - HMS Niobe – frigate
  - HMS Pallas – frigate
  - HMS Burford
  - HMS Généreux – 74-gun third rate
  - HMS Tartarus – bomb-ketch
  - HMS Calpe – brig sloop
- Spanish:
  - Cacafuego – 32 gun xebec frigate, modelled on the Spanish ship El Gamo
- Norwegian:
  - Dorothe Engelbretsdotter - merchantman
- French:
  - Desaix – ship of the line
In addition, O'Brian names all of the British, French and Spanish ships present in the Algeciras Campaign.

== O'Brian's sources ==
=== Background ===
In an introductory Author's Note to the novel, O'Brian sets out his approach to historical accuracy, noting that historic records of naval battles are filled with "actions that few men could invent". He goes on to say, "That is why I have gone straight to the source for the fighting in this book ... and so when I describe a fight I have log-books, official letters, contemporary accounts or the participants' own memoirs to vouch for every exchange ... Yet, on the other hand, I have not felt slavishly bound to precise chronological sequence; ... within a context of general historical accuracy I have changed names, places and minor events". He considers that "authenticity is a jewel", and that "the admirable men of these times ... are best celebrated in their own splendid actions rather than in imaginary contests".

The naval actions of the novel are closely based on the exploits of Thomas Cochrane (1775–1860), 10th Earl of Dundonald, a notoriously fiery naval captain and later admiral. Cochrane's own ship, HMS Speedy, forms the basis for Aubrey's Sophie.

Although Aubrey's exploits are historically sourced, his personality is O'Brian's own invention and differs significantly from that of the real Cochrane, a Scot who could at times be rash, confrontational and disagreeable. The character of Maturin is likewise of O'Brian's devising, though it has been said that the author's own personality, attitudes, interests and even appearance are closely reflected in his character's persona.

=== Specific events ===
The capture in the novel of the Spanish Cacafuego by the vastly inferior Sophie is based on the real-life capture on 6 May 1801 of the Spanish frigate El Gamo by the British brig-sloop HMS Speedy. One of the most spectacular single-ship victories in British Naval history, the El Gamo incident captured the public imagination and founded the reputation of the Speedy's commander, Thomas Cochrane. Like Aubrey in the book, however, Cochrane did not receive from the Admiralty the promotion and prize money he might have expected from so spectacular a victory.

The capture of Sophie by Christy-Pallière of the Desaix parallels the experience of Cochrane aboard the Speedy, down to the detail of the real Christy-Pallière refusing to accept the vanquished captain's sword: "I will not accept the sword of an officer who has for so many hours struggled against impossibility".

The exploit of deceiving a ship at night by attaching lights to a decoy was executed by Cochrane and was described in his Autobiography of a Seaman. A similar exploit was reported to have been used by the French privateer Joseph-Marie Potier to escape a British frigate near Quiberon Bay in January 1809.

For the Algeciras Campaign O'Brian studied the dispatches of admiral Sir James Saumarez along with other contemporary reports of the battle.

== Publication history ==
Geoff Hunt cover used on reissues

=== First US and UK publications 1969 / 70 ===
In the 1960s two of O'Brian's seafaring books for children, The Golden Ocean (1956) and The Unknown Shore (1959), caught the attention of a US publisher, J B Lippincott, who were seeking an author to follow in the footsteps of C S Forester, creator of the Hornblower series of novels. Forester had died in 1966 and a year later, at the age of 53, O'Brian started work on Master and Commander. The novel was first published in the US by Lippincott in 1969.

O'Brian's then UK publisher Macmillan, who had originally agreed to jointly commission the book, rejected it as too full of jargon. It was taken up and published by Collins in 1970.

The novel did respectably in Britain ("selling a most surprising number" according to O'Brian), but was not initially successful in the US. O'Brian later commented, "I am sorry to say that the Americans did not like it much at its first appearance (they have changed their minds since, bless them)".

Lippincott persevered in the US with publication of the next two novels in the series, Post Captain (1972) and HMS Surprise (1973), though sales remained slow. A change of US publisher to Stein and Day for The Mauritius Command did not help, and US publications ceased with Desolation Island in 1978.

=== Norton US reissue 1990 ===
In 1989, Starling Lawrence, an editor with the American publisher W. W. Norton & Company, borrowed a copy of The Reverse of the Medal from O'Brian's London literary agent to read on his flight home to New York. Lawrence persuaded Norton that in spite of the failed attempts of two previous US publishers Master and Commander and the subsequent novels were worth re-publishing. Norton's re-issued series (from 1990) was an almost immediate success and drew a new, large readership.

== Literary significance and criticism ==
This section concentrates on reviews of this specific novel. For more general reviews of the series as a whole, see Aubrey–Maturin series literary significance and criticism

=== First US and UK publications 1969 / 70 ===
C S Forester having died just a few years earlier, some critics were left bewildered and disappointed by the complexity of O'Brian's creation after the predictability of the Hornblower series. "Not, I think, memorable, at least in the Hornblower way" wrote the Irish Press, while according to the Library Journal, "Mourning Hornblower fans may prefer to read a good if disappointing new book rather than to reread one of the master's epics".

The reception of other critics was more positive. In the US, The New York Times Book Review noted the author's "delightful subtlety", and his "easy command of the philosophical, political, sensual and social temper of the times [that] flavors a rich entertainment", while Kirkus Reviews said that the book was "A welcome treat for sea hounds who care more for belaying pins than ravaged bodices below decks".

Several UK press reviewers were also impressed. The Sunday Mirror said "Nothing is glamourised. The press gangings, the squalor are all here....The battle scenes are tremendous...This is not secondhand Forester, but a really fine piece of writing", while Benedict Nightingale writing in The Observer called the book "Dashing, well-timbered, pickled in the period, and with strong human tensions and cross-currents". According to Tom Pocock in The Evening Standard, "It is as though, under Mr O'Brian's touch, those great sea-paintings at Greenwich had stirred and come alive".

The sailor Sir Francis Chichester, recently returned from his 1967 single-handed voyage round the world, described the book as "the best sea story I have ever read", a quote which the publishers adopted for use on the novel's front cover. Also used on the book's jacket in Britain was a heartfelt quote from the author Mary Renault, "A spirited sea-tale with cracking pace and a brilliant sense of period. In a highly competitive field it goes straight to the top. A real first-rater".

=== Later reviews ===
As the series of novels expanded, single-volume reviews became less common and reviewers tended to prefer retrospectives of the entire series to date. As one reviewer noted, "The best way to think of these novels is as a single 5,000-page book".

Although Master and Commander and its immediate sequels had received at first a somewhat muted reception in the US, in Britain and Ireland the voices of praise continued to increase and gradually became dominant. By 2000, O'Brian's reputation was such that his American biographer Dean King was able to place Master and Commander at the start of what he called the author's magnum opus, a twenty-novel series that has become perhaps the best-loved roman fleuve of the twentieth century: "[an] epic of two heroic yet believably realistic men that would in some ways define a generation".

Following O'Brian's death in 2000, Kevin Myers recalled in The Daily Telegraph his first reading of this and the subsequent two novels in the series: "the most glorious literary mixture ever – Jane Austen meets Gray's Anatomy meets John Buchan meets Apothecaries' Gazetteer. The author's cast of characters is Dickensian in its scope, but of greater subtlety and sophistication in its portrayal."

According to Richard Snow in 2004, the first meeting between Aubrey and Maturin (with which the novel opens) led to "the greatest friendship of modern literature". Snow quotes Fredric Smoler, professor of history and literature, in a Shakespearean comparison: "It's like Prince Hal meeting Falstaff".

Writing in 2013, the author Nicola Griffith professed herself smitten: "In these books every reader who loves fiction both intellectually and viscerally will find something to treasure – and every writer something to envy. They will sweep you away and return you delighted, increased and stunned". She noted that while many reviewers have compared O'Brian to C S Forester, such comparisons are 'nonsense' – "This is Jane Austen on a ship of war, with the humanity, joy and pathos of Shakespeare".

== Film adaptation ==
The 2003 Peter Weir film Master and Commander: The Far Side of the World, starring Russell Crowe and Paul Bettany, uses some of the characters, dialogue and events from the Aubrey–Maturin series, but does not faithfully reproduce the plot of the books.

== Bibliography ==
- Bennett, Stuart (1994). "Four Decades of Reviews". In Cunningham, A. E. (ed.). Patrick O'Brian: Critical Appreciations and a Bibliography. Boston Spa: The British Library. pp. 149–171. ISBN 0-7123-1070-3.
- Brown, Anthony Gary (2006). The Patrick O'Brian Muster Book (2nd ed.). Jefferson, NC: MacFarland and Company. ISBN 978-0-7864-9385-2.
- O'Brian, Patrick (1994). "Black, Choleric & Married?". In Cunningham, A. E. (ed.). Patrick O'Brian: Critical Appreciations and a Bibliography. Boston Spa: The British Library. pp. 15–21. ISBN 0-7123-1070-3.
- Harvey, Robert (2000). Cochrane: The Life and Exploits of a Fighting Captain. London: Robinson. ISBN 1-84119-398-4.
- King, Dean (2000). Patrick O'Brian: A life revealed. London: Hodder & Stoughton. ISBN 0-340-792558.
- Ollard, Richard (1994). "The Jack Aubrey Novels: an editorial report". In Cunningham, A. E. (ed.). Patrick O'Brian: Critical Appreciations and a Bibliography. Boston Spa: The British Library. pp. 23–31. ISBN 0-7123-1070-3.
