= HMS Pasley =

Two ships of the Royal Navy have been named HMS Pasley, after Admiral Sir Thomas Pasley. A third was planned, but renamed before entering service.

- HMS Pasley (1916) was an Admiralty M-class destroyer launched in 1916 and sold in 1921.
- HMS Pasley was to have been a frigate. She was renamed HMS St. Helena before her launch in 1943 and became one of the Colony class. She was returned to the US Navy in 1946.
- HMS Pasley (K564) was a Captain-class frigate launched in 1943. She was transferred to the Royal Navy under lend-lease, and was returned to the US Navy in 1945.

== See also ==
HM Hired armed vessel Sir Thomas Pasley
