= USS Champion (1777) =

History

United States
- Name: Champion
- Launched: 1777
- Out of service: 21 November 1777
- Fate: Scuttled on 21 November 1777

General characteristics
- Propulsion: Sail
- Armament: 8 Guns

USS Champion was an 8-gun xebec of the Continental Navy. Commanded by Captain James Josiah, she served in the Delaware River in a force composed of ships of the Continental and Pennsylvania State navies during the American Revolutionary War. It was this force that contested British efforts to establish sea communications with their forces in Philadelphia in the fall of 1777.

After several months of fighting against heavy odds, the American ships attempted to run past Philadelphia. The Pennsylvania State galleys succeeded but the Continental fleet, including Champion, was burned by its own officers on 21 November 1777, when tide and winds turned against them.
