= Action of 6 May 1801 =

1801 naval battle of the War of the Second Coalition

- Part of the War of the Second Coalition
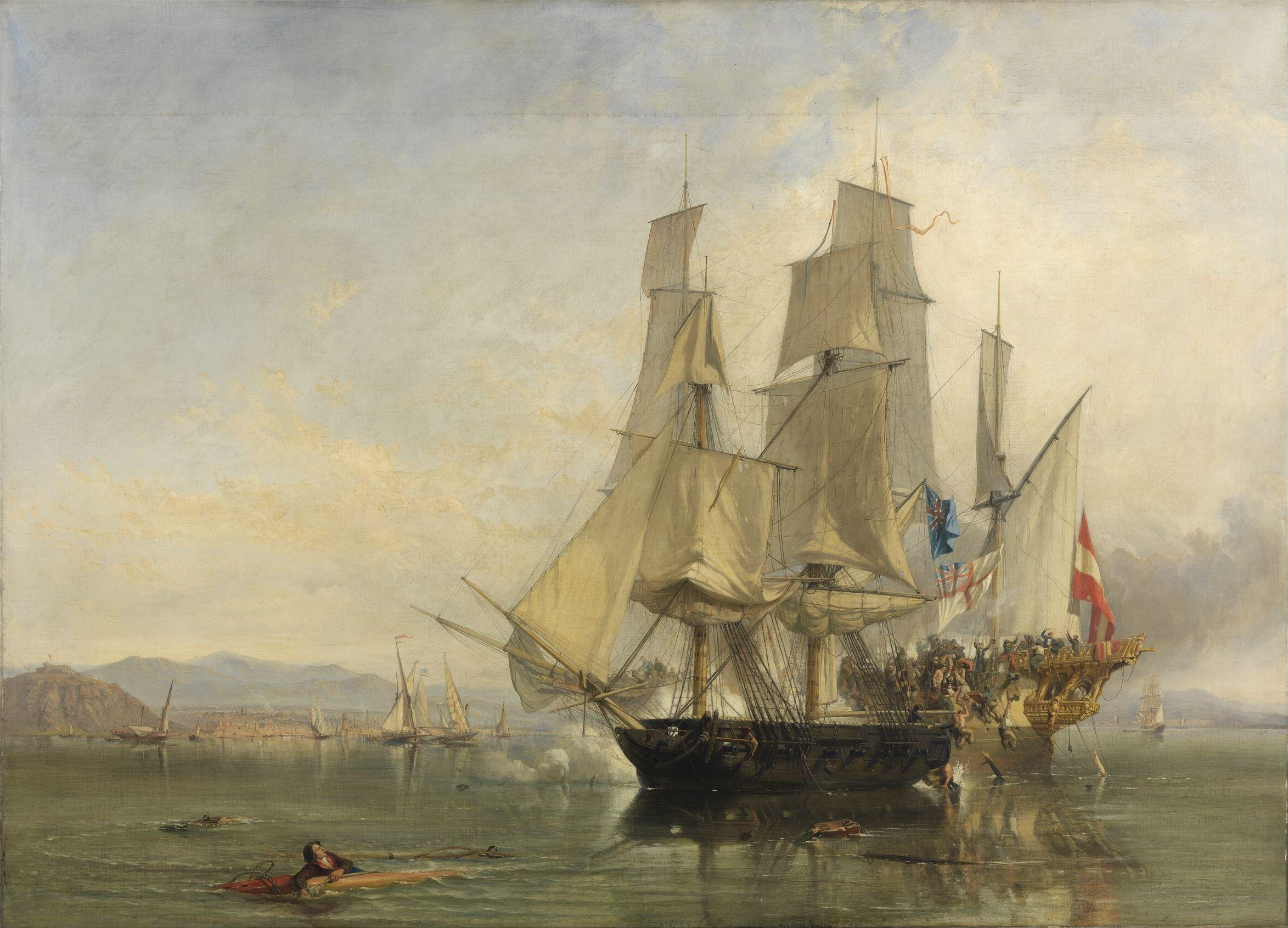
- The Capture of the El Gamo (1845)
Date	6 May 1801
Location	Off Barcelona, Mediterranean Sea
Result	British victory

Belligerents
United Kingdom	Spain

Commanders and leaders
Lord Cochrane	Francisco de Torres †

Strength
1 brig	1 xebec-frigate

Casualties and losses
3 killed 9 wounded	14 killed 305 captured 1 xebec-frigate captured

The action of 6 May 1801 was a single-ship action fought between the Spanish xebec-frigate El Gamo and the British brig-sloop HMS Speedy during the War of the Second Coalition. Under the command of Commander Lord Cochrane, Speedy, with a crew of 54 and mounting 14 guns, captured El Gamo, which mounted 32 guns and had a crew of 319. The Spanish ship's captain, Francisco de Torres, was one of 14 Spaniards killed during the engagement, with the British capturing the rest of El Gamo's crew and eventually selling the ship to the Regency of Algiers.

== Background ==
In March 1800, Commander Lord Cochrane of the Royal Navy, who had been operating in the Mediterranean and fought numerous actions from the British base at Port Mahon, Minorca, took command of the 14-gun brig-sloop HMS Speedy. On 6 May 1801, Speedy was cruising off Barcelona at dawn when she sighted a large ship, which turned out to be El Gamo, a 32-gun xebec-frigate of the Spanish Navy crewed by 318 men under Francisco de Torres. El Gamo was armed with 8- and 12-pounder long guns along with 24-pounder carronades, which amounted to a total broadside of 190 pounds, more than seven times that of Speedy. At the time of the engagement, Speedy only had 54 men onboard, as Cochrane had detached members of the ship's crew as prize crews.

== Battle ==
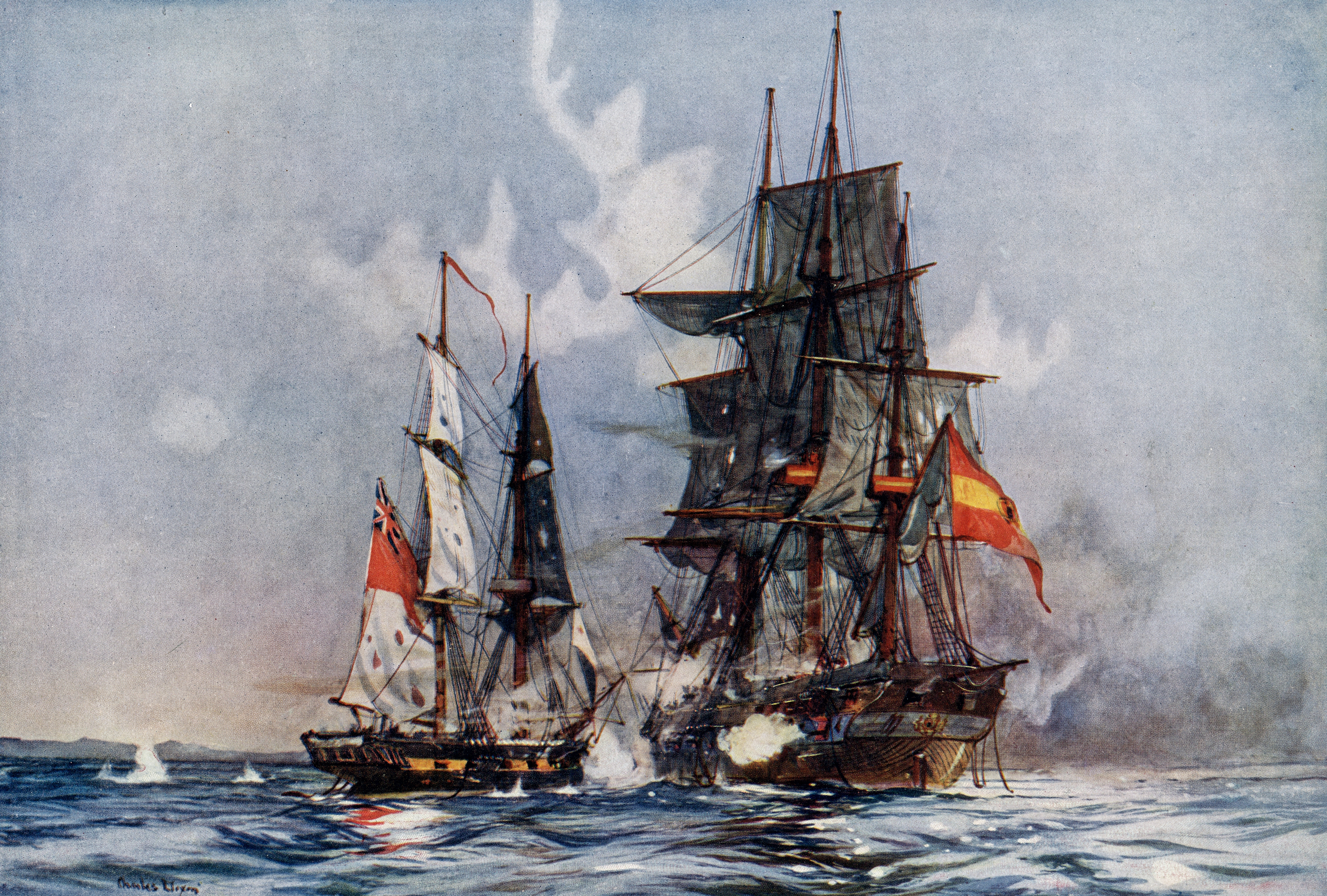
Illustration of the action by Charles Dixon

Instead of evading the Spanish ship, Cochrane ordered his crew to close on her, and at 9.30 a.m. El Gamo fired a warning shot at Speedy and hoisted Spanish colours. In response, Cochrane ordered American colours to be hoisted. The Spanish hesitated, allowing Speedy to get closer, hoist British colours, and evade El Gamo's first broadside. Speedy evaded another broadside, holding her fire until she ran alongside the Spanish ship and locked her yards in El Gamo's rigging. The Spanish ship's guns were mounted high and could not be depressed sufficiently to hit Speedy's deck or crew at this distance; their shots passed through sails and rigging. Cochrane's crew opened fire with 4-pounder guns loaded with double and triple shot, their shots passing up through El Gamo's sides and decks; the first British broadside killed de Torres and the Spanish ship's boatswain.

Seeing their disadvantage, El Gamo's second-in-command mustered a boarding party, which the crew of Speedy responded to by drawing off, pounding the party's massed ranks with cannon shot and musket fire, and then closing in again. After thrice having their attempts to board the British ship frustrated, the Spanish returned to their guns. Cochrane decided to board El Gamo, and assembled his remaining crew into two parties, leaving only Speedy's surgeon to command and crew Speedy. The first boarding party, consisting of 20 men under Cochrane's brother Archibald, boarded the Spanish ship from her bow after having darkened their faces to resemble Barbary corsairs. The Spanish rushed to repulse them, but were then attacked by the second party which boarded via El Gamo's stern. A hard-fought battle ensued between the two crews, until Cochrane called down to Speedy's surgeon, ordering him to send the rest of the crew over. The surgeon was the only man left on Speedy; the order was given to make the Spaniards think they were outnumbered. At the same time, Cochrane ordered the Spanish ensign to be torn down. Thinking that their own officers had struck the colours, the remaining Spaniards stopped fighting.

== Aftermath ==
British casualties during the engagement were only three men killed and nine wounded, while the Spanish lost 14 men, with the remaining 305 crewmembers of El Gamo, 41 of whom were wounded, becoming prisoners of war; a total casualty list that exceeded Speedy's entire complement. The British secured the Spanish prisoners below deck and made their way back to Port Mahon. Anguished that he had been defeated by such an inferior foe, Torres' second-in-command asked Cochrane for a certificate assuring him that he had done all he could to defend his ship. Cochrane obliged, with the equivocal wording that he had "conducted himself like a true Spaniard". El Gamo was not incorporated into the British navy, which resulted in Cochrane only receiving a small amount of prize money; he was promoted to captain by the British Admiralty in August 1801. The Spanish ship was subsequently sold by the British to the Regency of Algiers as a merchant ship.

== In literature ==
Patrick O'Brian's 1969 novel Master and Commander, the first in the Aubrey-Maturin series, is closely based on the engagement between HMS Speedy and El Gamo.

== Bibliography ==
- Adkins, Roy; Adkins, Lesley (2007). The War for all the Oceans: From Nelson at the Nile to Napoleon at Waterloo. Abacus. ISBN 978-0-349-11916-8.
- Cordingly, David (2007). Cochrane: The Real Master and Commander. London: Bloomsbury Publishing. ISBN 978-1-58234-534-5. "UK title: Cochrane The Dauntless: The Life and Adventures of Thomas Cochrane, 1775–1860"
- Henderson, James (2005) [1975]. Frigates, Sloops and Brigs: An Account of the Lesser Warships of the Wars from 1793 to 1815. Barnsley, England: Pen and Watch. ISBN 1-84415-301-0.
