= HMS Pasley (K564) =

Frigate of the Royal Navy

History

United States
- Name: unnamed (DE-519)
- Builder: Boston Navy Yard, Boston, Massachusetts
- Laid down: 18 July 1943
- Launched: 30 August 1943
- Renamed: Allocated to United Kingdom as USS Lindsey (DE-519) 19 October 1943
- Namesake: British name assigned in anticipation of transfer to United Kingdom
- Renamed: USS Pasley (DE-519) 1943
- Namesake: British name assigned in anticipation of transfer to United Kingdom
- Completed: 20 November 1943
- Fate: Transferred to United Kingdom 20 November 1943
- Acquired: Returned by United Kingdom 20 August 1945
- Commissioned: 20 August 1945
- Decommissioned: 26 October 1945
- Stricken: 16 November 1945
- Fate: Scrapped

United Kingdom
- Name: HMS Pasley (K564)
- Namesake: Admiral Sir Thomas Pasley (1734-1808), British naval officer
- Sponsored by: Mrs. Marjorie Rush
- Christened: 20 November 1943
- Acquired: 20 November 1943
- Commissioned: 20 November 1943
- Fate: Returned to United States 20 August 1945

General characteristics
- Displacement: 1,140 long tons (1,158 t)
- Length: 289.5 ft (88.2 m)
- Beam: 35 ft (11 m)
- Draught: 9 ft (2.7 m)
- Propulsion: Four General Motors 278A 16-cylinder engines; GE 7,040 bhp (5,250 kW) generators (4,800 kW); GE electric motors for 6,000 shp (4,500 kW); Two shafts
- Speed: 20 knots (37 km/h)
- Range: 5,000 nautical miles (9,260 km) at 15 knots (28 km/h)
- Complement: 156
- Sensors & processing systems: SA & SL type radars; Type 144 series Asdic; MF Direction Finding antenna; HF Direction Finding Type FH 4 antenna
- Armament: 3 × 3 in (76 mm) /50 Mk.22 guns; 1 × twin Bofors 40 mm mount Mk.I; 7–16 × 20 mm Oerlikon guns; Mark 10 Hedgehog antisubmarime mortar; Depth charges; QF 2-pounder naval gun

HMS Pasley (K564), ex-Lindsay, was a Captain-class frigate of the Evarts-class of destroyer escort, originally commissioned to be built for the United States Navy. Before she was finished in 1943, she was transferred to the Royal Navy under the terms of Lend-Lease, and saw service during the World War II from 1943 to 1945. She was the third ship of the Royal Navy to be named Pasley, after Admiral Sir Thomas Pasley (1734–1808), who commanded aboard his flagship HMS Bellerophon at the Glorious First of June in 1794.

== Construction and transfer ==
The still-unnamed ship was laid down as the U.S. Navy destroyer escort DE-519 at the Boston Navy Yard in Boston, Massachusetts, on 18 July 1943 and was launched on 30 August 1943. On 19 October 1943, she was allocated to the United Kingdom and received the British name Lindsay, but the British soon changed her name to Pasley to avoid confusion with the Royal Canadian Navy corvette HMCS Lindsay. Upon completion on 20 November 1943, she was christened, sponsored by Mrs. Marjorie Rush, and transferred to the United Kingdom.

== Service history ==
=== Royal Navy, 1943-1945 ===
Commissioned into service in the Royal Navy as HMS Pasley (K564) on 20 November 1943 simultaneously with her transfer, the ship served on patrol and escort duty for the remainder of World War II. The Royal Navy returned her to the U.S. Navy in England on 20 August 1945.

=== U.S. Navy, 1945 ===
Retaining her British name, the ship was commissioned into the U.S. Navy as USS Pasley (DE-519) on 20 August 1945 simultaneously with her return to U.S. custody. She soon steamed to the Philadelphia Navy Yard at Philadelphia, Pennsylvania, where she was decommissioned on 26 October 1945.

== Disposal ==
The U.S. Navy struck Pasley from its Naval Vessel Register on 16 November 1945. She subsequently was scrapped.
