= Xebec =

Mediterranean sailing ship

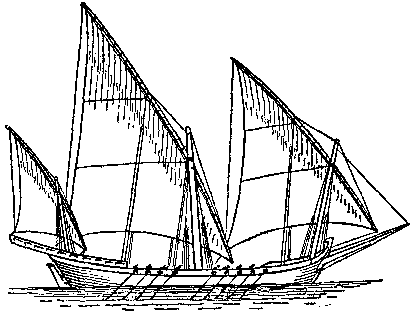
- A xebec with three lateens and oars
- Type: Sailing vessel
- Place of origin: Algeria

Service history
- In service: 16th to mid-19th century
- Used by: (Regency of Algiers) Algiers (Beylik of Tunis) Tunis (Ottoman Tripolitania) Tripolitania; Ottoman Empire; Morocco; Sometimes used in Europe

Specifications
- Mass: 100–200 tons, in some cases up to 600 t
- Crew: 90 to 400

A xebec (/ˈziːbɛk/ or /zɪˈbɛk/), also spelled zebec, was a Mediterranean sailing ship that originated in the Barbary states (Algeria). It was used mostly for trading. Xebecs had a long overhanging bowsprit and aft-set mizzen mast. The term can also refer to a small, fast vessel of the sixteenth to nineteenth centuries, used almost exclusively in the Mediterranean Sea.

== Description ==
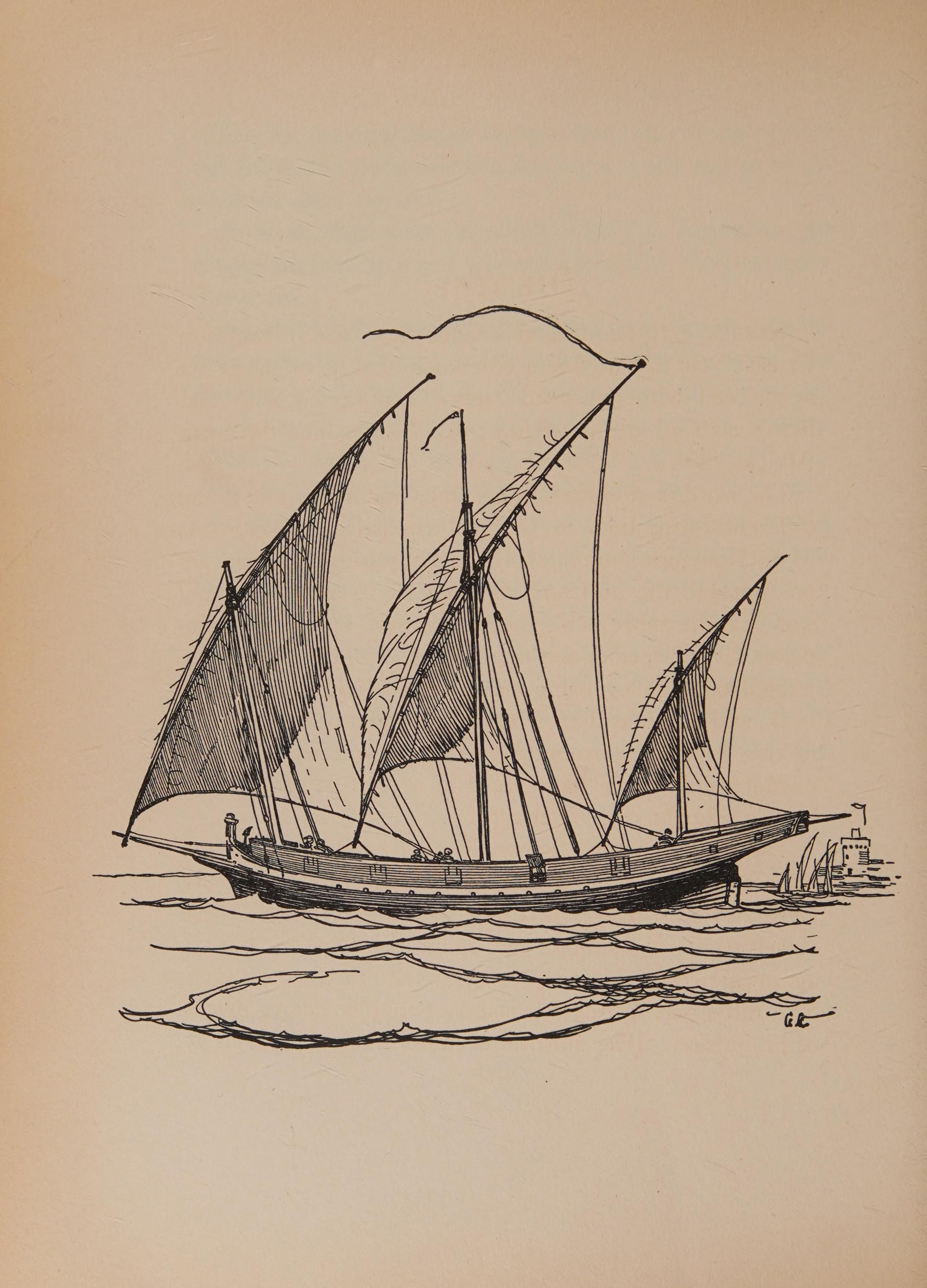
A xebec; pen-and-ink plate by Gordon Grant from The Book of Old Ships (1924).

Xebecs were ships similar to galleys primarily used by Barbary pirates, which have both lateen sails and oars for propulsion. Early xebecs had two masts while later ships had three. Xebecs featured a distinctive hull with pronounced overhanging bow and stern, and rarely displaced more than 200 tons, making them slightly smaller and with slightly fewer guns than frigates of the period.

=== Use by Barbary corsairs ===
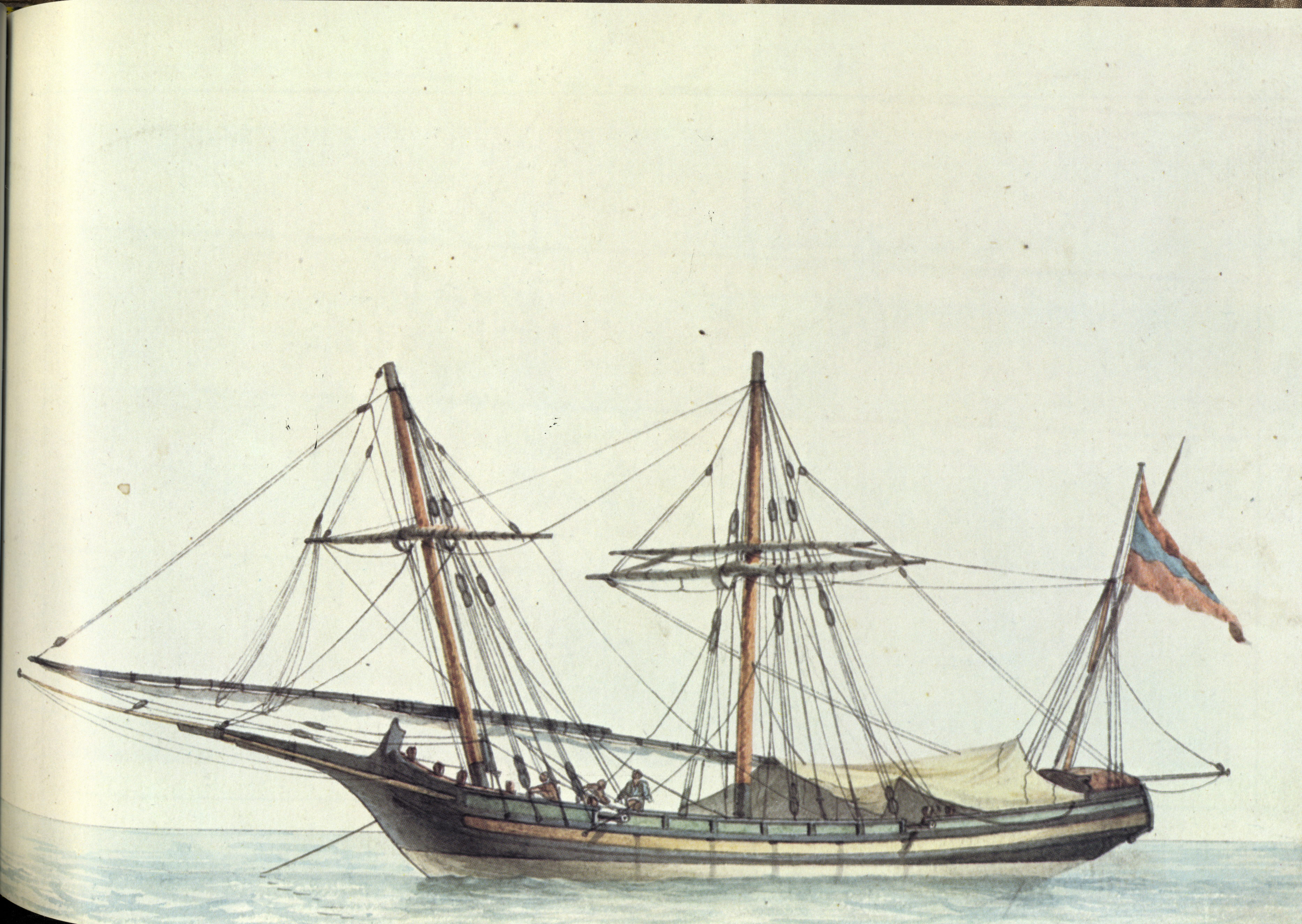
Greek-Ottoman xebec

These ships were easy to produce and were cheap, and thus nearly every corsair captain (Raïs) had at least one xebec in his fleet. They could be of varying sizes. Some ships had only three guns while others had up to forty. Most xebecs had around 20–30 cannons, and the overwhelming majority had swivel guns equipped.

After the 18th century, galleys became increasingly outdated and xebecs became the preferred ships of Barbary pirates thanks to their heavy and effective use of wind power, reduced need for slaves to row, ability to carry more cannons than a galley, and overall cheapness, speed, and maneuverability.

Xebecs were generally faster than contemporary ship types until the introduction of steamships.

Corsairs built their xebecs with a narrow floor to achieve a higher speed than their victims, but with a considerable beam in order to enable them to carry an extensive sail-plan. The lateen rig of the xebec allowed the ship to sail close hauled to the wind, often giving it an advantage in pursuit or escape. The use of oars or sweeps allowed the xebec to approach vessels which were becalmed. When used as corsairs, the xebecs carried a crew of between 90 and 400 men.

The use of square rig among pirates was initially rare, although after the 1750s a mix between lateen and square rigs became much more widespread.

=== Use by European powers ===
Some xebecs of the Spanish Navy, about 1770 (see Antonio Barceló campaigns... in the Spanish version of the page of Wikipedia):

- Andaluz, 30 guns (4 × 8-pounders)
- Africa, 18 guns (4-pounders)
- Atrevido, 20 guns
- Aventurero, 30 guns (3 × 8-pounders)
- Murciano, 16 guns, 4 pedreros (light swivel guns)
- San Antonio

Notable xebecs of the French Navy include four launched in 1750:

- Ruse, 160 tons, 18 guns
- Serpent, 160 tons burthen, 18 guns
- Requin, 260 tons burthen, 24 guns
- Indiscret, 260 tons burthen, 24 guns

In the eighteenth and early nineteenth centuries, a large polacre-xebec carried a square rig on the foremast, lateen sails on the other masts, a bowsprit, and two headsails. The square sail distinguished this form of a xebec from that of a felucca which is equipped solely with lateen sails. The last of the xebecs in use by European navies were fully square-rigged and were termed xebec-frigates.

The British brig-sloop Speedy's (14 guns, 54 men) defeat of the Spanish xebec-frigate El Gamo (32 guns, 319 men) on 6 May 1801 is generally regarded as one of the most remarkable single-ship actions in naval history. It was the foundation of the legendary reputation of the Speedy's commander, Lord Cochrane, which has in turn provided the inspiration for sea fiction such as Patrick O'Brian's Master and Commander.

== Etymology ==
Xebec is also written as xebeck, xebe(c)que, zebec(k), zebecque, chebec(k), shebeck (/ʃɪˈbɛk/); from (Catalan: xabec, French: chabec, now chebec, Spanish: xabeque, now jabeque, Portuguese: enxabeque, now xaveco, Italian: sciabecco, zambecco, stambecco, Maltese: xambekk, Greek: σεμπέκο, sebeco Ligurian: sciabécco, Arabic: شبكة, shabaka and Turkish: sunbeki). Words similar in form and meaning to xebec occur in Catalan, French, Spanish, Portuguese, Italian, Arabic and Turkish. The Online Etymology Dictionary regards the Arabic shabaka (meaning "a small warship") as the source form; however, the Arabic root means 'a net', implying the word originally referred to a fishing boat.

== See also ==
- Polacca
- USS Champion
- Dhow
