= Spanish frigate El Gamo =

19th-century Spanish ship

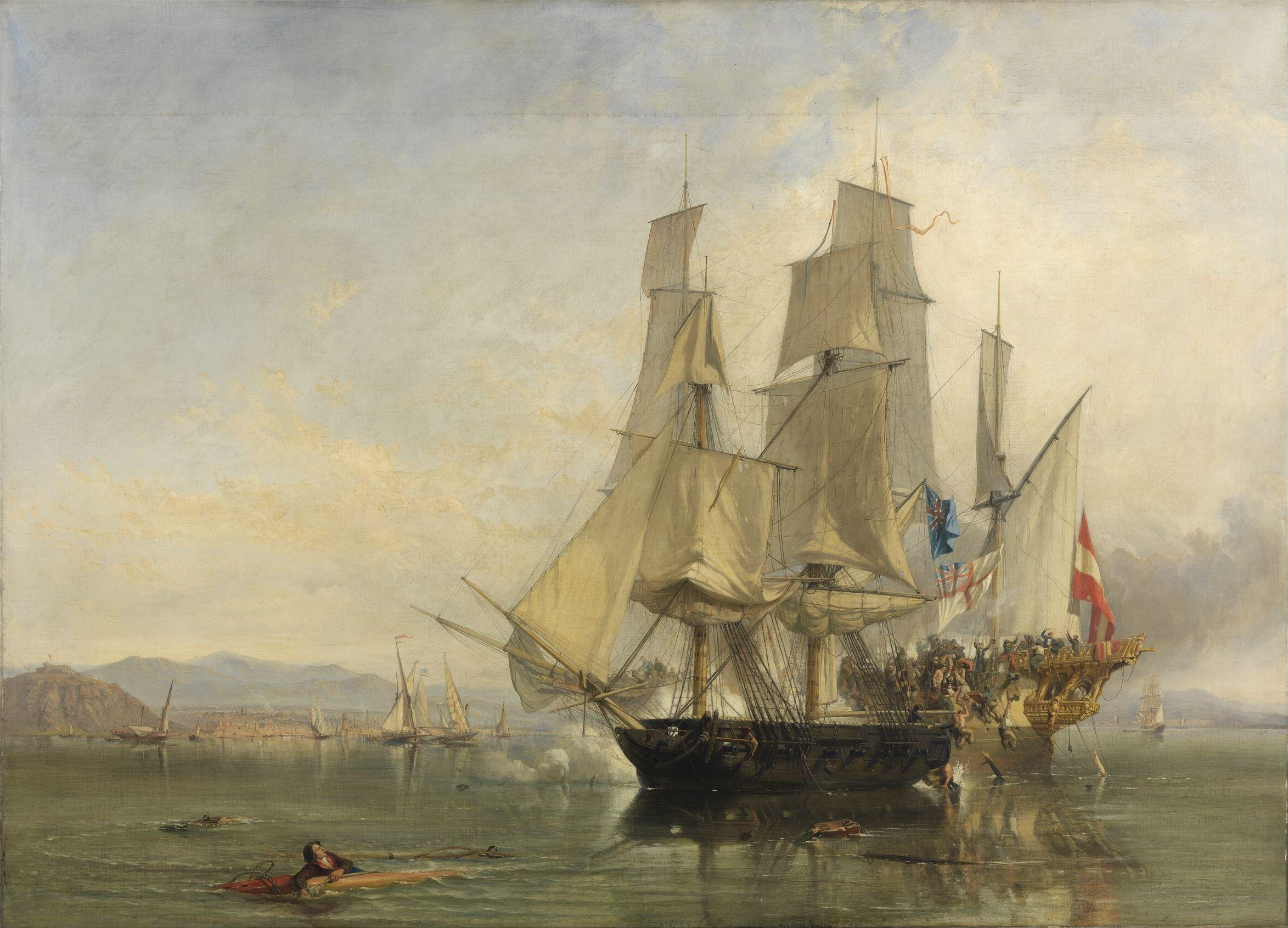
- El Gamo (first from right, foreground) at the action of 6 May 1801

History

Spain
- Name: El Gamo
- Namesake: Spanish for "the fallow deer"
- Captured: 6 May 1801 by HMS Speedy
- Fate: Sold to the Regency of Algiers as a merchant ship

General characteristics
- Class & type: 32-gun xebec-frigate
- Displacement: ≈600 tons
- Sail plan: Interchangeable xebec-rigged and ship-rigged
- Complement: 319
- Armament: 32 guns: 22 × 12-pounder guns; 8 × 8-pounder guns; 2 × 24-pounder carronades

El Gamo was a 32-gun xebec-frigate of the Spanish Navy captured by the Royal Navy sloop-of-war HMS Speedy in the action of 6 May 1801. The engagement was notable for the large disparity between the size and firepower of El Gamo and Speedy; the former was around four times the size, had much greater firepower and a crew six times the size of Speedy, which had a reduced crew of 54 at the time. After her capture, the British sold El Gamo to the Regency of Algiers as a merchant ship.

== Bibliography ==
- Winfield, Rif; Tredrea, John M.; García-Torralba Pérez, Enrique & Blasco Felip, Manuel (2023). Spanish Warships in the Age of Sail 1700—1860: Design, Construction, Careers and Fates. Seaforth Publishing. ISBN 978-1-5267-9078-1.
