= HMS Dolphin =

Numerous Royal Navy vessels have been named HMS Dolphin after the dolphin.

- The first seven Dolphins were small ketches and fireships.
- HMS Dolphin (1731), launched in 1731, was a 20-gun post ship, renamed Firebrand in 1755 and Penguin in 1757.
- HMS Dolphin (1751), launched in 1751, was a 24-gun post ship. She was used as a survey ship from 1764 and made two circumnavigations under the command of John Byron and Samuel Wallis. She was broken up in 1777.
- HMS Dolphin (1781) was a 44-gun fifth rate launched in 1781 and broken up in 1817.
- HMS Dolphin (1799) was originally the Dutch 24-gun Dolflin, launched in 1780 at the Amsterdam naval yard, which HMS Wolverine and HMS Arrow captured at Vlie Island in 1799. She became a transport in 1800, a storeship in 1802, and was broken up in 1803.
- HMS Dolphin (1801) was a 10 or 12-gun cutter hired by the Royal Navy in 1793, purchased in 1801, and sold in 1802.
- HMS Dolphin (1813) was the 12-gun American privateer schooner Dolphin captured by Admiral John Borlase Warren's squadron on 13 April 1813.
- HMS Hindostan (1804) was originally the East Indiaman Admiral Rainier, purchased in 1804 and renamed Hindostan, renamed Dolphin in 1819, and Justitia in 1830. She was used as a convict ship and sold in 1855.
- HMS Dolphin (1836) was a 3-gun brigantine launched in 1836 and sold in 1894.
- HMS Dolphin (1882) was a screw sloop launched in 1882. She served as a submarine depot ship in World War I. She foundered in 1925 but was beached and used as a school ship. She was broken up in 1977.
- HMS Dolphin (1924) was originally the depot ship Pandora, purchased in 1914. She was renamed Dolphin in 1924 and was sunk by a mine in 1939.
- HMS Dolphin (shore establishment), the spiritual home of the Royal Navy's submarine service at Fort Blockhouse in Gosport, and was a submarine base until 1994 and training school to 1999.
  - HMS Dolphin (1938) was the former HMS Aberfoyle transferred in 1938 as tender to the submarine base until 1947.

== Also ==
- HMS Dolphins Prize, a brig-sloop that was formerly the French privateer La Marquise de Cavalaire, captured by HMS Dolphin on 19 September 1747
- In 1803 Salvador del Mundo, anchored in Portsmouth, had a cutter Dolphin that made two captures in company with the privateer Henry.
