= HMS Speedy =

Nine ships of the Royal Navy have borne the name HMS Speedy:

- HMS Speedy (1782) was a 14 gun sloop-of-war, launched in 1782. She was captured by the French in 1794, retaken by HMS Inconstant in 1795 and commanded by Thomas Cochrane in 1801. The French captured her again in 1801, whilst she was in the Mediterranean Sea, and donated her to the Papal Navy, She was struck in 1806.
- HMS Speedy (1798) was a gunboat serving on the Canadian Great Lakes. She was launched in 1798 and foundered in 1804.
- HMS Speedy (1803) was a brig-sloop, formerly George Herbert, purchased in 1803 and sold in 1818 for use as a floating chapel. The chapel was used until 1834 then she was broken up.
- HMS Speedy (1828) was a six-gun cutter launched in 1828, converted to a dockyard mooring lighter in 1853 and renamed YC.11 and broken up in 1866.
- HMS Speedy (1860) was a wood screw gunboat of the Britomart class, launched in 1860 and broken up in 1889.
- HMS Speedy (1893) was a torpedo gunboat launched in 1893 and sunk by a mine in the Humber estuary in 1914.
- HMS Speedy (1918) was an S-class destroyer launched in 1918 and sunk on 24 September 1922 in a collision with a tug in the Sea of Marmara.
- HMS Speedy (J17) was a Halcyon-class minesweeper launched in 1938. She was sold in 1946 and renamed Speedon, and was broken up at Aden in 1957.
- HMS Speedy (P296) was a jetfoil launched in 1979 and sold into mercantile service in 1986.

== See also ==
- Speedy-class brig
- Speedy (disambiguation)
