= Speedy =

Speedy refers to something or someone moving at high speed.

Speedy may refer to:

== People ==
- Speedy (nickname), a list of people
- Speedy Long (1928–2006), American lawyer and politician
- Speedy Mashilo (born 1965), South African politician
- Tristram Speedy or Captain Speedy (1836–1911), English adventurer and explorer and guardian of Prince Alamayou
- Walter Speedy Sr. (1878–1943), American golfer noted for his contributions to African-American golfing
- Yolande Speedy (born 1976), South African mountain biker
- Speedy (musician), Puerto Rican reggaeton artist Juan Antonio Ortiz Garcia (born 1979)
- Speedy Atkins (1875–1928), American tobacco worker Charles “Speedy” Henry Atkins who became a tourist attraction mummy

== Fictional characters and mascots ==
- Speedy Gonzales, a Warner Bros. cartoon character
- Speedy (DC Comics), two DC Comics superheroes, both teenage sidekicks of Green Arrow
- Speed Buggy, an anthropomorphic, fiberglass dune buggy, often nicknamed "Speedy"
- Speedy Alka-Seltzer, the original mascot for the stomach remedy
- Speedy, in two Oz books by L. Frank Baum, The Yellow Knight of Oz and Speedy in Oz
- Speedy, one of the names for Pinky in the game Pac-Man
- Speedy Comet, a type of Prankster Comet from the video game Super Mario Galaxy
- Speedy McAllister, a steam locomotive in the British animated television series Chuggington

== Ships ==
- HMS Speedy, nine ships of the Royal Navy
- Speedy-class brig, a British class of naval ship
- Speedy (1779), a whaler and convict ship despatched in 1799 from England to Australia

== Other uses ==
- Speedy (film), a 1928 silent comedy starring Harold Lloyd
- Speedy (band), a Britpop band
- Speedy (Telkom), an internet broadband access provider of Telkom Indonesia
- Speedy Hire, a British tools and equipment company
- Speedy, a Bulgarian delivery company, which is a subsidiary of Geopost

== See also ==
- SPDY, a networking protocol
- Spee De Bozo, J. Edgar Hoover's Carin terrier
- Speedee, McDonald's original mascot
