= Charles Adkins =

Charles Adkins may refer to:

- Charles Adkins (politician) (1863–1941), American politician from Illinois
- Charles Adkins (boxer) (1932–1993), American Olympic boxer

== See also ==
- Charles "Speedy" Atkins (1875–1928), American folk figure
- Adkins (surname)
