= Young Nicholas (1798 ship) =

History

Dutch Republic & Batavian Republic
- Builder: Holland
- Launched: 1790
- Captured: c.1798

Great Britain
- Name: Young Nicholas
- Owner: Prinsep & Co., equally Prinsep & Saunders
- Acquired: c.1798 by purchase of a prize
- Fate: Wrecked 3 September 1804

General characteristics
- Tons burthen: 392, or 393, or 400(bm)
- Complement: 1799:30; 1803:50
- Armament: 1799:14 × 2&4&6-pounder guns; 1803:10 × 6-pounder guns + 6 × 18-pounder carronades + 6 swivel guns

Young Nicholas was built in Holland in 1790 under another name. The British captured her in 1798 and Prinsep & Saunders purchased her and named her Young Nicholas. She made one voyage under license from the British East India Company (EIC) that resulted in legal difficulties. Next, she had a short, unsuccessful cruise as a privateer that resulted in a French privateer capturing her in a single-ship action, but then releasing her. Lastly, she made a third cruise that resulted in a French privateer capturing her, the Royal Navy recapturing her, and her being wrecked in a hurricane. This cruise too resulted in legal difficulties culminating in a notable court case.

== Career ==
Young Nicholas entered Lloyd's Register (LR) in 1798 with D. Ferris, master, Prinsep & Co., owners, and trade London-Cape of Good Hope. However, Young Nicholas's first voyage, in 1798, was to St Petersburg. In September she was at Elsinore, and by end-September had returned to Elsinore from there.

=== Cape of Good Hope ===
Captain Daniel Ferris acquired a letter of marque on 16 January 1799. However, Captain Richard Silby (or Tilby), acquired one on 26 January.

Young Nicholas arrived at the Cape on 12 June 1799. It is not clear what Young Nicholas did between her arrival in June and early 1800. She is recorded as arriving again at the Cape from Saldanha Bay on 18 January 1800.

However, in early 1800 Messrs. Walker and Peters purchased 367 bags of Java coffee and one case of gum Benjamin at a prize court sale of the cargo of the Danish ship Christianus Septimus. (Note: In May 1798 the Danish ship Christianus Septimus, Christian Sonningen, master, put into Simon's Bay. She had been sailing from Batavia to Copenhagen but damage from bad weather had rendered her so leaky she could not be repaired and was not seaworthy. On 29 May the squadron stationed at the Cape and under the command of Admiral Hugh Cloberry Christian, detained Christianus Septimus. The case took a year before the Vice admiralty court at the Cape ruled that the vessel and her cargo be restored to her owners. Because much of her cargo was perishable, the court ruled that it could be sold at the Cape, but only for export to Copenhagen, her original destination.) They also purchased three cases of bandannoes and three cases of tamarinds from the prized cargo of the American ship Pacific. (Note: After the French had driven the American ship Pacific onshore at River Noir, Adamant, Jupiter, and Tremendous came on the scene and sent in their boats, which removed much of Pacific's cargo of bale goods and sugar. The British then set Pacific on fire.) Walker and Peters loaded their purchases aboard Young Nicholas as she was preparing to sail to England. However, they could not get permission to export their purchases and requested that they be allowed to unload the cargo and put it under the "King's Locks" until they could the authorities could advise on its export or disposal. They received permission to land the goods.

However, Henry James Jessup, Chief Searcher of His Majesty's Customs at the Cape, on the advice of Peter Mosse, Advocate, requested that W.S. van Ryneveld, the King's Fiscal, detain Young Nicholas and seize the cargo that had come from Christianus Septimus. Because Christianus Septimus had been ruled not a prize, her carrying cargo from east of the Cape, to wit, Batavia, to England represented a violation of the British East India Company's monopoly. When the goods were landed, Jessup seized them. The merchants involved had the authorization under a law of the colony to ship them to England. Charges and counter-charges were made, and several people were relieved of their offices, Jessup among them. They then sailed to England.

The government in May 1800 chartered Young Nicholas for a year in what appeared to have been a highly irregular arrangement. The government agreed with Walker & Robertson to a charter at a rate of £1200 per month. Walker & Robertson agreed on a parallel charter with Captain Selby on a rate of £591 per month. The only other difference between the two charters was that the value in case of the loss of Young Nicholas was stated as £6000 on the charter to the government, and £4000 on the parallel charter to Walker and Robertson.

Next, Young Nicholas was one of 28 vessels that left England between December 1800 and February 1801 to bring back rice from the Cape of Good Hope or beyond. The EIC had a monopoly on such trade and the vessels and sailed under charter to it. Prinsep & Saunders alone tendered 15 vessels, including Young Nicholas, Richard Silby, master.

The government took up Young Nicholas at the Cape in early November 1802 to transport 160 to 170 tons of cannon and some officers and 250 invalids to Spithead. Lieutenant Street, the agent for transports, was placed in charge of her. Young Nicholas arrived at Portsmouth on 18 February 1803. The report of her arrival described her as a hired armed transport under the command of Lieutenant B. Street, and bringing ordnance stores, 200 invalids, and some passengers. Actually, the invalids she had embarked numbered 193 men, 20 men, and 15 children, the women and children presumably the dependents of the men.

=== Privateer ===
In June 1803, after the resumption of war with France, Young Nicholas became a privateer, with Captain John Cunditt acquiring a letter of marque.

On 7 July Young Nicholas encountered the French privateer Blonde, of 22 guns and 100 men. The ensuing engagement lasted an hour and a half before Young Nicholas struck after she had suffered four men killed. Captain Aregnaudeau of Blonde gave Young Nicholas up to Captain Cunditt and his crew in recognition of their "courageous Conduct", and she arrived at Penzance on the 29th.

=== Last voyage ===
On 3 September 1803 Prinsep & Co. and Hunter signed a charter party. Young Nicholas was to sail to Honduras to gather mahogany, 60 tons of dye wood, and logwood or fustic. She gathered 200,000 feet of wood and sailed for London on 29 March 1804. A storm on 21 April so damaged Young Nicholas that she had to put into port to effectuate repairs.

Lloyd's List reported on 29 May that Young Nicholas had been parted with off Charleston in a leaky state. She intended to put into Charleston. Lloyd's List reported about a month later that Young Nicholas, Henry, master, had put into Savannah in distress. She was reported to be sailing from Honduras to London. To pay for the necessary repairs Young Nicholas's master sold part of her cargo.

Young Nicholas, Horry, master, sailed from Savannah on 8 July. The next day a French privateer captured her and sent her to Guadeloupe. Eventually, Captain Horry arrived at Liverpool in Daphne.

On 6 August, HMS Hippomenes recaptured Young Nicholas, which was laden with mahogany. Hippomenes sent her into St Kitts.

On 3 September 1804 a hurricane at St Kitts drove her ashore, wrecking her. She was one of five ships and several small craft that the hurricane destroyed. All crews were saved.

== Court case ==
When Young William came in to St Kitts as a prize, the Vice admiralty court ordered her sold, together with her cargo. Captain Horry/Henry then brought the proceeds home with him and passed them to Princep & Saunders, who deducted freight charges from them. The owners of the cargo sued for the return of the freight charges. The charter party specified that one-third of the freight was due on the cargo's arrival in England, and two-thirds some 90 days later. The court agreed with the plaintiff, Hunter, that as the cargo had not arrived in England no freight was due and so Prinsep & Saunders were required to refund the charges.
