= Culland's Grove (1802 EIC ship) =

History

United Kingdom
- Name: Culland's Grove
- Namesake: Culland's Grove, Southgate, Middlesex
- Owner: 1802:Atty & Co.; Managing owner:William Borradaile
- Builder: Fishburn and Brodrick, Whitby
- Launched: 16 February 1802 (Note: Weatherill gives two years, 1801 and 1802.)
- Captured: 22 July 1803

General characteristics
- Tons burthen: 556, or 57679/94, or 599, or 600 (bm)
- Length: 128 ft 2 in (39.1 m) (overall); 104 ft 0 in (31.7 m) (keel)
- Beam: 32 ft 3 1/2 in (9.8 m)
- Depth of hold: 16 ft 0 in (4.9 m)
- Complement: 56
- Armament: 16 × 6-pounder guns

Culland's Grove was a merchant ship launched in 1802 that the British East India Company (EIC) hired as an "extra ship". On her maiden voyage she sailed to Bengal and Benkulen. The French privateer Blonde captured her on her return voyage.

== Career ==
Culland's Grove enters the shipping registers in 1802, with the entry in the Register of Shipping being earlier than that in Lloyd's Register.

Year	Master	Owner	Trade	Notes	Source
1802	Charter; Anderson	J. Atty; Williamson	Weymouth—London; London—India		Register of Shipping
1802	Anderson	Boradale	London—India	"Cutland's Grove"	Lloyd's Register

Captain Archibald Anderson sailed Culland's Grove from Portsmouth on 20 May 1802. He left during peacetime, but while he was away war with France resumed in early 1803. The EIC arranged for the issuance of a letter of marque that authorized him to engage in offensive action against the French should the opportunity arise. The letter was issued on 20 June 1803.

On 22 July 1803, as Culland's Grove was in the Atlantic on her way home, she had the misfortune to encounter the French 32-gun privateer Blonde, which was under the command of François Aregnaudeau, at 50°21′N 17°0′W. Aregnaudeau had had a successful cruise already, but Culland's Grove, as an Indiaman returning with a valuable cargo, proved to be a particularly attractive prize. Culland's Grove was not in a position to resist and struck. Aregnaudeau took her and another of his prizes, Flirt, a former Royal Navy brig converted to a whaling ship that was returning to London from the South Seas Fisheries, into Pasajes on 3 August. Culland's Grove then sailed from Pasajes to Bordeaux where she was condemned as a prize.

According to French records, Culland's Grove proved to be worth 2.5 million francs in insurance money. The EIC put the value of the cargo lost when the French captured her at £24,640.

== Controversy ==
The Committee of Directors of the EIC prepared a report that they sent to Sir Evan Nepean, Secretary of the Navy, who transmitted it to Admiral sir William Cornwallis, commander-in-chief of the Channel Fleet. The Directors protested that the capture of Culland's Grove was the fault of Captain Charles Paget, captain of HMS Endymion.

Shortly before Culland's Grove was captured, she had encountered Endymion. The officer Paget sent aboard the Indiaman proceeded to press 12 seamen. Culland's Grove's captain and second officer protested vehemently that they were already weakly manned and that this would leave them even more short-handed, but Paget was acting within the law. The Royal Navy was short of men and was in the habit of stopping homecoming merchant vessels and taking some of their best sailors. Paget's position was that the men he took were "surplus company, and that he was authorized to press men out of homeward-bound ships."

All that came of this was that Paget was reminded of his obligations "to protect and assist the trade of His Majesty's subjects." As the privateer Blonde had an armament and complement more than double that of Culland's Grove, even without the impressment, it is not clear that Paget's depredations mattered. One would have to argue that a better-manned Culland's Grove might have outsailed Blonde.
