= Speedy (nickname) =

Speedy is a nickname which may refer to:

- Speedy Atkins (1875–1928), American worker whose corpse was turned into a mummy
- Speedy Claxton (born 1978), American basketball coach and former player
- Speedy Duncan (1942–2021), American football player
- Speedy Haworth (1922–2008), American guitarist and singer
- Gregory S. Martin (born 1948), United States Air Force general
- Speedy Morris (born 1942), American basketball coach
- Jeret Peterson (1981–2011), American aerial skier
- Speedy Smith (born 1993), American basketball player for Hapoel Jerusalem of the Israeli Basketball Premier League
- Speedy Thomas (1947–2003), American football wide receiver
- Speedy Thompson (1926–1972), American racing driver
- Speedy West (1924–2003), American guitarist
- Darren Watkins Jr. (born 2005), American influencer, entrepreneur and online streamer

== See also ==
- Bob Feller (1918–2010), American baseball pitcher nicknamed "Rapid Robert"
- Nick Van Exel (born 1971), American basketball coach and former player nicknamed "Nick the Quick"
