= Blonde (1803 ship) =

History

France
- Name: Blonde
- Builder: Bordeaux
- Launched: 1801 or 1802
- Commissioned: June 1803 (as privateer)
- Fate: Captured by HMS Loire on 17 August 1804

History

United Kingdom
- Name: Fame
- In service: By December 1804
- Out of service: 31 January 1805
- Fate: Wrecked at Guernsey

General characteristics
- Type: Corvette
- Displacement: 550 tons (French)
- Crew: 16 officers and from 190 to 225 men
- Armament: 24 to 26 × 8-pounder long guns; 6 to 8 × 6-pounder long guns

Blonde was a French 32-gun privateer corvette, built in Bordeaux around 1801 and commissioned in 1803 under François Aregnaudeau. She preyed on British and American commerce, notably destroying the Royal Navy corvette HMS Wolverine, before the frigate HMS Loire captured her on 17 August 1804. She became the British private frigate Fame and was wrecked at Guernsey, Channel Islands on 31 January 1805.

== Privateer ==
Blonde started her career in June 1803 under François Aregnaudeau, a promising privateer captain noted for capturing several valuable ships off Dartmouth on Heureux Spéculateur.

Blonde had a successful cruise, notably capturing the former Royal Navy brig Flirt, by then commissioned as a whaling ship and returning to London from the South Seas Fisheries.

On 7 July Blonde encountered the British privateer Young Nicholas, of 18 carriage guns and 50 men. The ensuing engagement lasted an hour and a half before Young Nicholas struck after she had suffered four men killed. Aregnaudeau gave her up to her captain and crew in recognition of their "courageous Conduct", and she arrived at Penzance on the 29th.

On 22 July, at 50°21′N 17°0′W, Blonde encountered the under-manned East Indiaman Culland's Grove, which struck. Culland's Grove was on her return leg from India and carried a valuable cargo amounting to 2.5 million francs in insurance money.

On 24 February 1804, Blonde departed from Santander, Spain, and in the following days captured the ships Diana, Eclipse, Sally and Rebecca, Rollindson, and Zephir. On 24 March she encountered an eight-ship convoy escorted by the corvette HMS Wolverine. Aregnaudeau attacked Wolverine and forced her to surrender. Wolverine sank almost immediately after striking. While Blonde's crew was busy rescuing the survivors, the convoy attempted to escape. Still, Blonde managed to capture two ships, Nelson and Union. Blonde then returned to Pasaia, having captured a total of eight ships and 228 prisoners.

Denis Decrès ordered that the most deserving crew members of Blonde be honoured; Aregnaudeau received a sword of honour from the merchants of Bordeaux, and on 18 July 1804 he was made a Knight in the Legion of Honour.

== Fate ==
On 16 August 1804, at coordinates 47°30′N 12°20′W, Blonde encountered the frigate HMS Loire. After a chase of 20 hours, including a running fight of a quarter of an hour, during which the British had one midshipman and five men wounded, and the French lost two men killed and five wounded, Blonde struck. Loire took her prize in tow to Plymouth where the prisoners were disembarked on 31 August.

Blonde was not commissioned in the Royal Navy, she was sold privately. She was renamed Fame. On 14 December 1804, she drove ashore at Devil's Point, Plymouth. She was refloated. On 31 January 1805, she was driven ashore and wrecked at Guernsey, Channel Islands. Her 150 crew were rescued.
