= Fishburn's shipyard =

Ship-builders in North Yorkshire, England

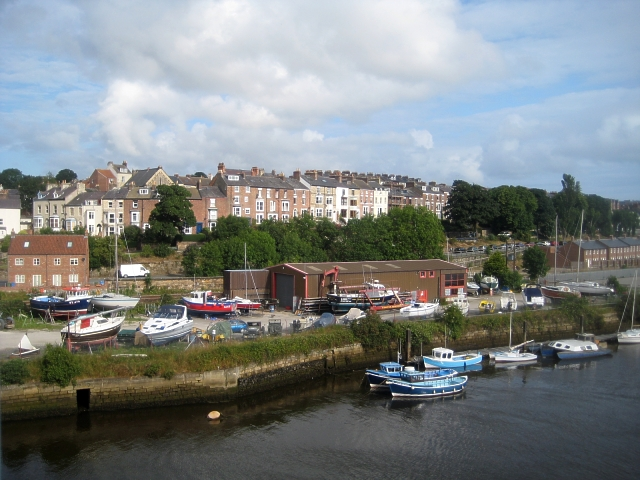
- Marina boatyard, the approximate location of the Fishburn shipyard
- Formerly: Fishburn Yard
- Company type: Private company
- Industry: Shipbuilding
- Predecessor: Fishburn Yard
- Founded: c. 1748
- Founder: Thomas Fishburn
- Defunct: 1830
- Headquarters: Whitby, North Yorkshire, England
- Products: Sailing ships

Fishburn's shipyard was a Shipbuilding enterprise located on the west bank of the River Esk estuary in Whitby, North Yorkshire, England. The yard operated between 1748 and 1830 under three people, but retaining the name of Fishburn throughout. The yard is probably the most famous of all the Whitby shipyards as at least three of the boats the yard built in the 18th century, were renamed by the Royal Navy and sailed by Captain Cook on his voyages to what is now Oceania. The yard remained active into the 19th century producing 60 vessels in 22 years with an average measurement of 241 tons.

== History ==
Thomas Fishburn started his shipbuilding business in the old Jarvis Coates shipyard on the east side of the Esk estuary in Whitby c. 1748 on a site previously used for shipbuilding. It is alleged in various sources that Fishburn was an apprentice at the Coates' yard, before he struck out on his own venture. Fishburn considered himself a Master Builder [of ships], rather than as a shipwright, as the term shipwright was deemed to be a job for someone of a poor skills. However, in an advertisement from 1758, Fishburn was described as a "ship-builder". (Note: The full text of the advert reads: "Thomas Fishburn, Ship-builder, at Whitby, having at a great expence [sic] erected a Dry Dock fit for the Reception of Ships of any burthen, begs leave to acquaint owners and commanders of ships, who will pleaſe (please) to favour him with their commands, that they might be aſſured (assured) of having their Buſineſſ (business) done on the moſt (most) reaſonable (reasonable) Terms." The advert has many Long s' and also has good many capitals of words that would not be capitalised in modern language.) Fishburn was the first to build the dry dock at Bog Hall, later to become part of the railway sidings, though his first dry dock was built on the soft mud of the riverbed, and subsequently sank into the estuary in 1757. In 1784, a ropery covering 300 yards (270 m) was built between the ship yard and the dry dock.

With the land and dock acquisitions that the Fishburn family achieved, they became one of three great shipbuilding families to operate in Whitby in the 18th century (the others being the Barry and the Barrick families). The first mention of Fishburn & Brodrick building ships together is in 1795, (Note: Fishburns launched seven ships in 1790, six in 1791, seven in 1792, six in 1793, one in 1794, two in 1795 under William & Thomas Brodrick, and two in the same year under the name Fishburn & Brodrick.) but by this time, the Thomas Fishburn in question was the son of the founder. As well as building ships, Fishburn and Brodrick owned three whaling ships between at least 1803 and 1816.

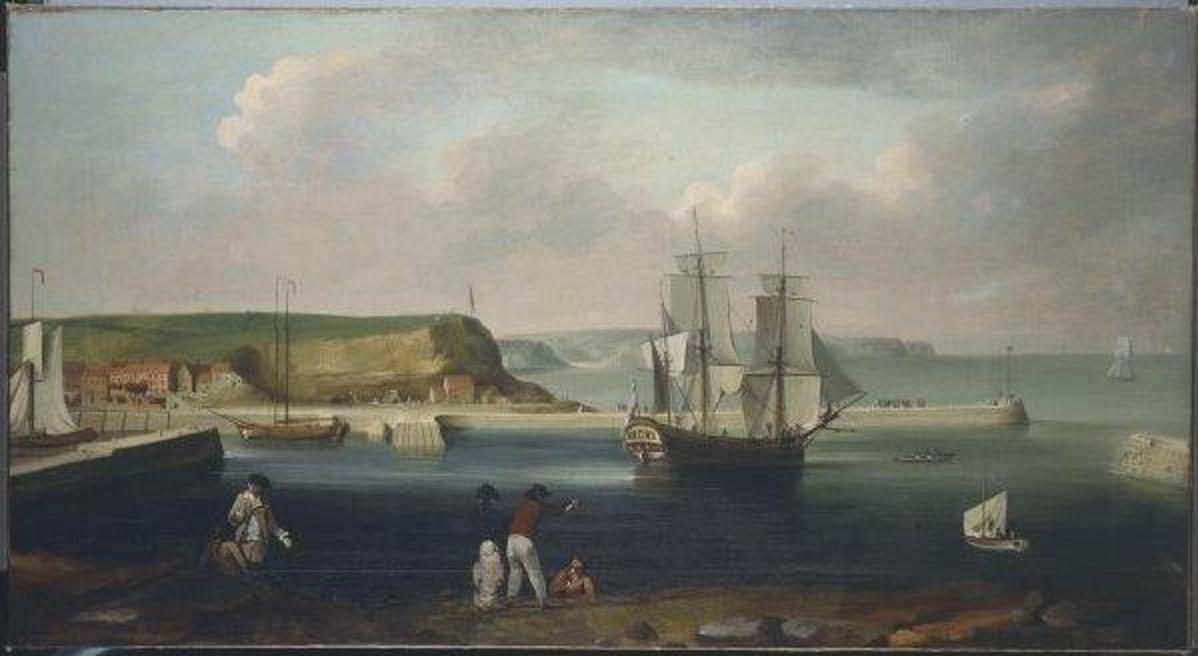
Endeavour, leaving Whitby, Thomas Luny 1768

Perhaps the most famous of any of the ships to leave the Fishburn shipyard was the Earl of Pembroke, later bought by the Royal Navy and renamed Endeavour, then sailed to the South Seas on Cook's voyages. Cook himself, visited the shipyard in 1771 when on shore leave to "report how suitable and seaworthy" Endeavour had been for his trip. He also noted to the shipyard's owners that two more of their ships (The Marquis of Granby and the Marquis of Rockingham) had also been purchased for the next trip. Moore notes that as at least three of Fishburn's ships had been requisitioned into the Royal Navy for trips to the southern seas, his yard was

...far from being an obscure business on a provincial river, Fishburn's shipyard was becoming something of a Georgian Cape Canaveral: a launch site for expeditions to new worlds.

Between 1793 and 1815 when Britain was engaged in various military campaigns, the yard of Fishburn & Brodrick managed to launch over 100 ships, measuring in excess of 30,000 tons. Between 1800 and 1822 when Fishburn and Brodrick stopped building together, they launched 60 ships with a total measurement of 14,457 tons, with an average of 241 tons per vessel.

The partnership between the second Thomas Fishburn and Brodrick was dissolved in August 1822; the yard closed around 1830, with Fishburn dying in 1826, and Brodrick dying in 1829. The area that the shipyard occupied was filled in and converted into the railway approaches and railway station in the town by 1847. The first sod of the new railway was turned at Bog Hall on the site of the old Fishburn & Brodrick shipyard, and another Thomas Fishburn was one of the promoters of the new railway. The sale of the shipyard to railway company yielded him £2,400 (equivalent to £264,000 in 2025). The slipway remained extant after closure and was reused by another Whitby shipbuilder, Hobkirks, until the early 1860s. The dry dock was still in use up until 1902, having been leased by Turnbull and Son in 1843. Part of the former shipyard area has since been converted from railway sidings into a supermarket.

== Ships built ==
A selection of ships built at Fishburn's Shipyard, and then Fishburn & Brodrick listed by year of launch
Launched	Name	Notes	Ref
1752	Liberty & Property	The ship carried coal up and down the east cost of England for at least 102 years; Barker states she disappears from the records after 1854, but Weatherill states she was lost near Xatthammarswick [sic] island (Gotland) in 1856.	
1764	Earl of Pembroke	The ship was rebuilt in the Royal Navy's own yard at Deptford on the River Thames and renamed HMS Endeavour in 1768. It was later renamed Lord Sandwich 2, and scuttled in Newport Harbor during the War of Independence to prevent the French sailing into the harbour.	
1764	Union		
1770	Marquis of Granby	Acquired by the Royal Navy in 1771 and renamed HMS Resolution	
1770	Marquis of Rockingham	The ship was renamed HMS Adventure in 1771	
1776	Chapman	Chapman measured 558 tons burthen and was supposed to be named Sibella, but the name was changed before the ship was launched. She was purchased and used by the East India Company.	
1781	The Esk		
1783	Hope	Weatherill notes she was captured by the French, but does not give a date of when this occurred.	
1789	Middleton		
1790	Adeona	Other ships launched in 1790 include Favourite, Ann, Tyro, Amity, and Esk.	
1791	William	Other ships launched in 1791 include Atty, Canada, and Hannah.	
1791	Melantho	She was wrecked on rocks of the Scilly Isles in 1801.	
1792	Iris	Other ships launched in 1792 include May, Albion, Cygnet, Urania, Mariner, Dolphin, Progress and Crescent.	
1793	William	Other ships launched in 1793 include Eolus, Fidelity, Vesta, Laurel, and John	
1794	Harbinger		
1794	Defence		
1795	Zealous	Other ships launched in 1795 include Desire, Benson, Enterprise, and Nimble	
1795	Nereid	Fist ship listed as being built by Fishburn & Brodrick	
1795	Coverdale		
1796	Acteon	Other ships launched in 1796 include Trident, Aimwell, and Swift.	
1797	Adroit	The one other ship launched in 1797 was Pacific.	
1798	Mary	Other ships launched in 1798 include John, Rover, and Emerald.	
1799	Stranger	Other ships launched in 1799 include Alert, Ann, and Refuge.	
1800	Paragon	Other ships launched in 1800 include Oak, Garland, Spring, Sophia, Alliance, Mentor and Simpson.	
1801	Little Henry	Other ships launched in 1801 include Union, Latona, Standard, and Dorothy.	
1801 (1802)	Culland's Grove	Two launch dates are given	
1802	Neptune	Weatherill lists the Neptune as being "taken by the enemy", but gives no date for the action. Other ships launched in 1802 include Margaret, Agriculture, Chilton, and Galilee.	
1803	Resolution	A whaler, built by and part-owned by Fishburn & Brodrick, not to be confused with HMS Resolution. The 1803 Resolution was 291 tonnes (286 long tons; 321 short tons), and cost £7,791. Other ships built in 1803 were Hebe, and Susanna.	
1804	Lincoln	Other ships launched in 1801 include Idas, Oxford, and Albion.	
1805	Sprightly.	Other ships launched in 1796 include Vine, and King George.	
1806	Ruby	Robust also launched in 1806.	
1807	Planter	Mariner also launched in 1807	
1808	Patriot	Other ships launched in 1808 include Aurora, and Leda.	
1810	Three Brothers		
1811	Centurion	William also launched in 1811	
1812	Bollona	Other ships launched in 1812 include Pomona, and Esk.	
1813	Grantham	The vessel had the official number of 3685, and was registered at South Shields. She disappeared in January 1863 after setting sail from the River Tyne. Other ships launched in 1813 include Flora, Minerva, Violet, and Messina.	
1815	Salus		
1816	Star		
1819	Oswy		
1819	Sovereign	Shipwrecked at Riga in October 1863	

== See also ==
- Ship and boat building in Whitby
