= Raid on Oropesa =

Raid on Oropeso
- Part of the French Revolutionary Wars
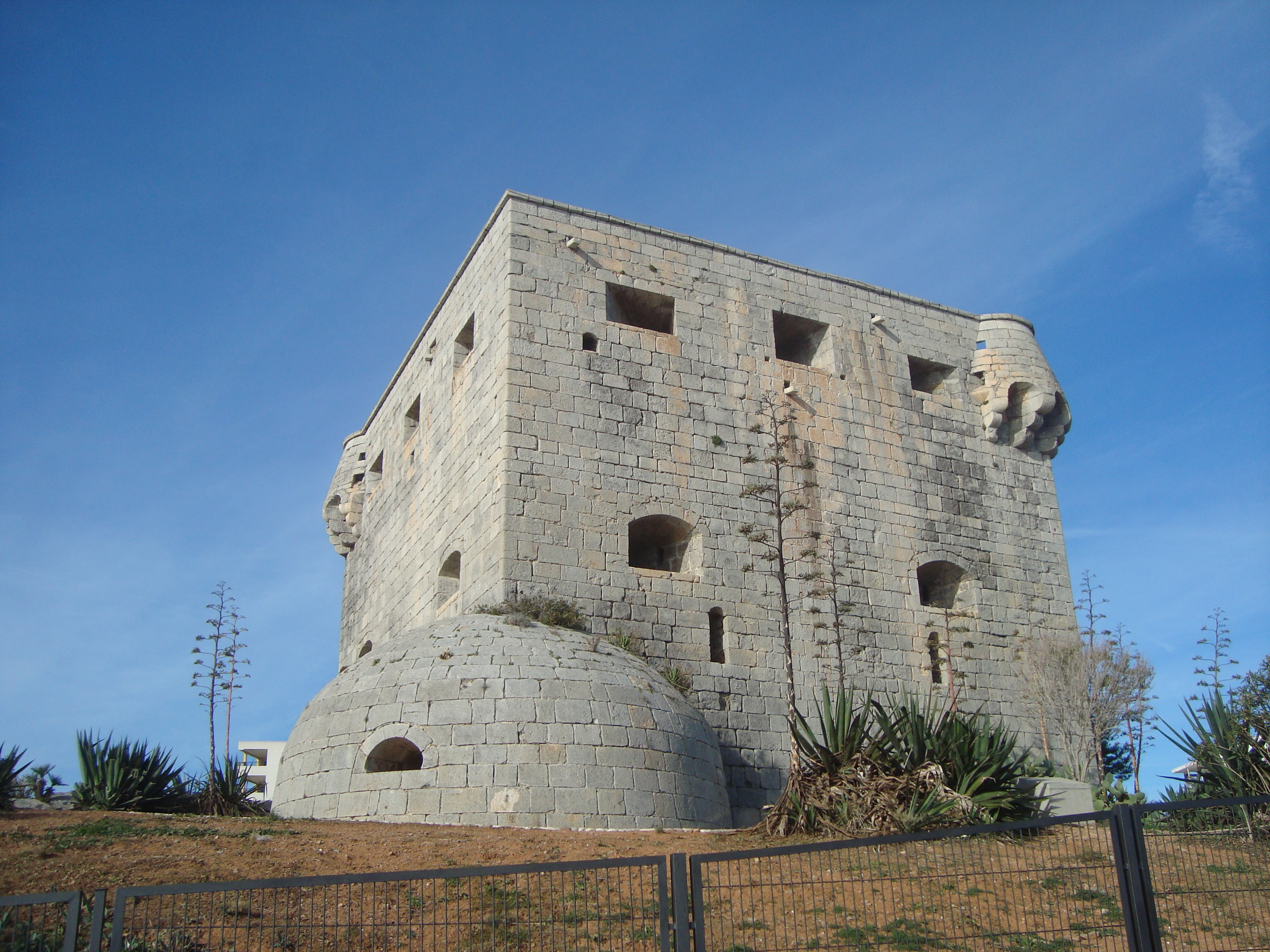
- Torre del Rey, the focal point of the raid
Date	9 June 1801
Location	Oropesa del Mar, Mediterranean Sea 40°4′58″N 0°8′44″E
Result	British victory

Belligerents
United Kingdom	Spain

Commanders and leaders
Thomas Cochrane; George Pulling	unknown

Strength
1 Sloop; 1 Brig	12 gun fortification 1 Xebec; 1 Felucca; 4 gunboats 12 merchant vessels

Casualties and losses
1 killed 7 wounded	1 Xebec and 2 gunboats sunk 3 brigs captured Rest driven ashore Unknown casualties

The Raid on Oropesa took place on 9 June 1801 off the coast of Spain at Oropesa del Mar, when two Royal Navy brigs; HMS Kangaroo and HMS Speedy attacked the port after chasing an armed Spanish convoy. The two British ships took out a fortification of twelve guns and then sank or drove ashore all of the Spanish ships with the exception of three brigs, which they captured.

== Background ==
The 16-gun HMS Kangaroo under Commander George Charles Pulling had been patrolling off Barcelona when she met up with the brig Speedy, under Commander Lord Cochrane on 1 June. Speedy had just pulled off a victory against a much larger opponent, that being the frigate El Gamo which she battled and captured.

They encountered a British privateer from Menorca that informed them that she had sighted a Spanish convoy of twelve vessels and five escorts three days earlier. The two British brigs set out to try to catch up with the convoy.

On 8 June, they landed before the tower of Almanara which protected a Spanish privateer with seven guns. The tower was armed with only two 4-pounder guns, but refused to surrender. The landing party attacked and took the tower following which they demolished it, with only Cochrane and two men being lightly wounded. With the fort demolished Cochrane then boarded and captured the Spanish privateer with only light resistance.

== Raid ==
The next morning Speedy found the convoy sheltering under the guns of a battery at Oropeso. This consisted of a large, square tower, the "Torre del Rey", armed with some twelve guns. The Spanish escorts consisted of a xebec of twenty guns, and three gunboats. Cochrane anchored offshore and wanted to wait until night to send in a cutting out party. However, Kangaroo arrived and Pulling, as the senior commander, decided to wait until the next morning.

The following morning, the two British vessels anchored within gunshot - some 250 yards (230 m) from the shore and 500 yards (460 m) from the town. The vessels opened fire and continued until mid-afternoon when the xebec and two gunboats, which had suffered too much damage, sank. A felucca of twelve guns and two more gunboats joined the defenders.

By 6:30pm the fire from the Spanish defenders slackened and Kangaroo came in close to the tower, silencing its fire by 7pm. At the same time, Speedy engaged the felucca and the surviving gunboats, which then fled. The British continued to undergo small arms fire from the shore until midnight, at which time the boats from the two brigs went in and brought out three Spanish brigs which they found containing wine, rice, and bread. Cochrane then went in with the boats for a second try, but the British found that all their quarry were either sunk or driven ashore. Seeing this the British made away with the prizes they had, and carried on further down the coast.

== Aftermath ==
The next day Kangaroo and Speedy sailed for Menorca with their prizes; Pulling stated that they had expended all their ammunition, otherwise they would have reduced the tower as well. Speedy had expended some 1,400 shot and had less than a broadside left. In the action Kangaroo lost a midshipman killed, and five seamen severely, and two lieutenants and three seamen slightly wounded; Speedy had no casualties. Spanish casualties were unknown and the loss of the ships would have been a blow.

The commander-in-chief Lord Keith sent his congratulations to both Pulling and Cochrane. Three weeks later Cochrane and Speedy were cruising off Alicante when they encountered several merchant vessels, which were driven ashore. Rather than wasting time trying to get them off, he burnt them. Kangaroo was then sailed back to England where the admiralty put her for sail at Deptford in February 1802 and was sold that month. Speedy was captured by a large French Squadron led by Rear-Admiral Charles Linois on their way to Cádiz, which would later be the genesis for the Battle of Algeciras Bay.

== Bibliography ==
- Adkins, Roy; Adkins, Lesley (2007). The War for all the Oceans: From Nelson at the Nile to Napoleon at Waterloo. Abacus. ISBN 978-0-349-11916-8.
- Cordingly, David (2007). Cochrane the Dauntless. London: Bloomsbury. ISBN 978-0-7475-8545-9.
- Lewis, Jon (2014). The Mammoth Book of Pirates. Constable & Robinson. ISBN 9781780332710.
