= Coverdale (1795 ship) =

History

Great Britain
- Name: Coverdale
- Owner: 1795:Norrison Coverdale, London; 1806: Lynie
- Builder: Fishburn and Brodrick, Whitby
- Launched: 29 October 1795
- Fate: Dismasted, abandoned at sea, and burned 24 August 1806

General characteristics
- Tons burthen: 561, or 579, or 57934/94, or 612 (bm)
- Length: Overall: 120 ft 10 1/2 in (36.8 m); Keel: 96 ft 3 in (29.3 m)
- Beam: 33 ft 1 1/2 in (10.1 m)
- Complement: 50
- Armament: 12 × 6-pounder guns
- Notes: Three decks

Coverdale was launched at Whitby in 1795. She made two voyages for the British East India Company (EIC). She then became a West Indiaman. She foundered in 1806 on her way back to England from Jamaica.

== Career ==
EIC voyage #1 (1796–1798): Captain Benjamin Gowland sailed from London on 26 April 1796 and from Portsmouth on 25 May, bound for Bengal. Coverdale was at Gibraltar on 15 June, Tenerife on 8 July, and the Cape of Good Hope on 9 September. She arrived at Calcutta on 11 February 1797. Homeward bound, she was at the Cape on 14 September, reached St Helena on 21 October, and arrived at Long Reach on 4 February 1798.

EIC voyage #2 (1798–1800): Captain Gowland acquired a Letter of marque on 1 August 1798. The EIC also had Cloverdale measured and inspected. He sailed from London on 30 July and from Portsmouth on 27 September, bound for Madras and Bengal. Coverdale reached the Cape on 14 January 1799 and arrived at Madras on 9 May. She then arrived at Calcutta on 25 July. Homeward bound, she was at Saugor on 23 October, reached St Helena on 26 January 1800, and arrived at Long Reach on 9 June.

The Register of Shipping for 1801 showed Coverdale's master as Faulkner and her trade as "London transport".

Coverdale, "M Master", arrived at Jamaica on 25 April 1804. She had parted from the fleet from Portsmouth and its escort, HMS Uranie, on 25 March in a gale.

On 19 November 1805, the Executors of Norrison Coverdale sold Coverdale.

The Register of Shipping for 1806 showed her master as W. Bradley, her owner as Lynie, and her trade as London–Jamaica.

== Fate ==
Coverdale was dismasted in the Atlantic Ocean on 24 August during the 1806 Great Coastal hurricane as she was sailing from Jamaica to London. Her crew abandoned her and set her on fire. Union, Bruce, master, rescued nine crew members and brought them to Virginia. Larkins may have saved the rest of the crew.
