= HMS Flirt (1782) =

Brig of the Royal Navy

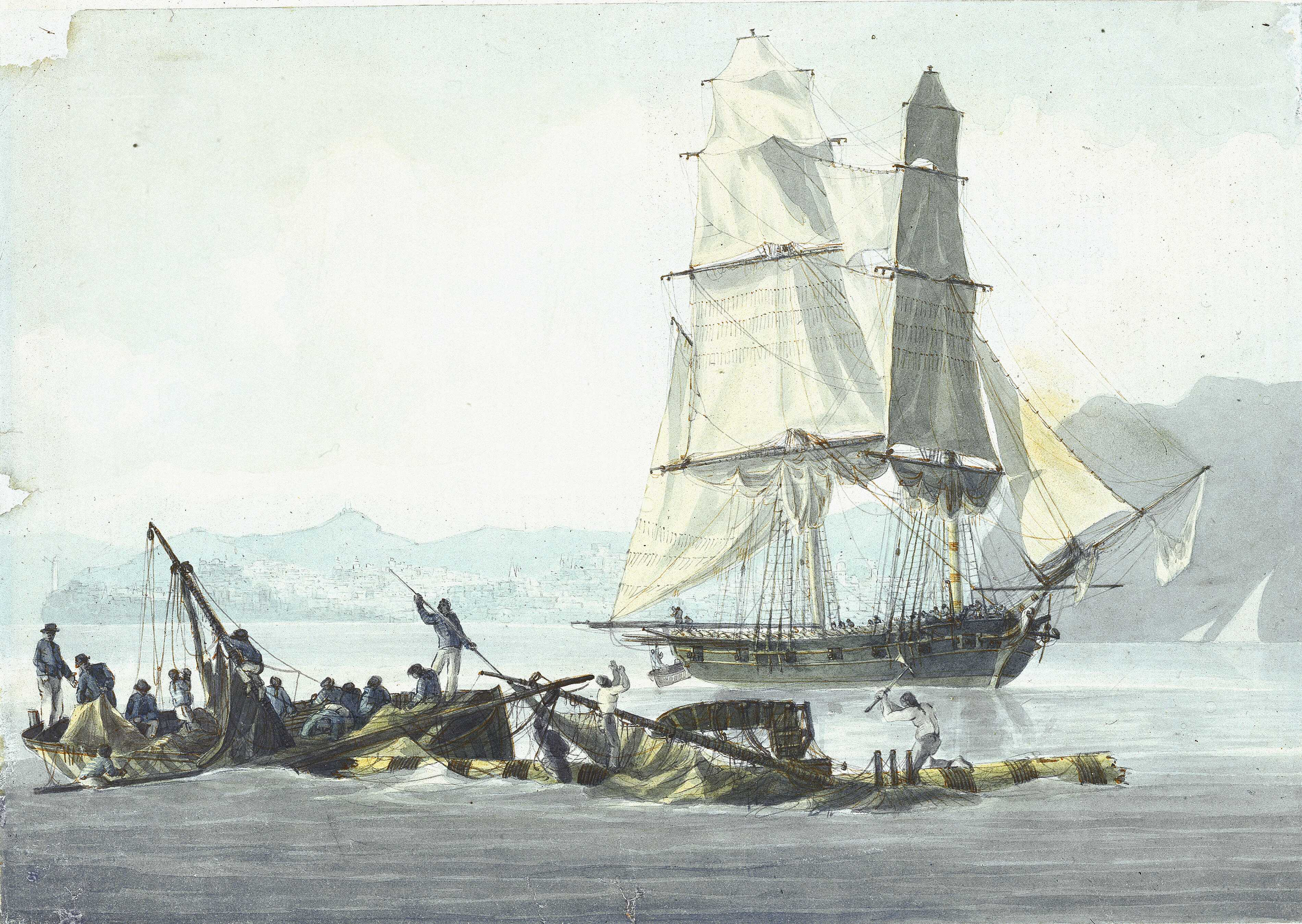
- HMS Speedy, Flirt's sister ship, in 1800

History

Great Britain
- Name: HMS Flirt
- Operator: Royal Navy
- Ordered: 23 March 1781
- Builder: Thomas King, Dover
- Laid down: August 1781
- Launched: 4 March 1782
- Commissioned: March 1782
- Fate: Sold December 1795

Great Britain
- Name: Flirt
- Owner: Daniel Bennett (1796-1802); Warren (1802-3)
- Acquired: 1795 by purchase
- Captured: 22 July 1803

General characteristics
- Class & type: Speedy-class brig-sloop
- Tons burthen: 20886/94, or 189 (bm)
- Length: 78 ft 3 in (23.9 m) (overall); 58 ft 11 3/8 in (18.0 m) (keel)
- Beam: 25 ft 9 3/4 in (7.9 m)
- Depth of hold: 10 ft 10 in (3.3 m)
- Complement: 90
- Armament: Navy brig:14 × 4-pounder guns + 12 swivel guns; Whaler: unarmed
- Notes: Two decks and three masts

HMS Flirt was launched in 1782 but was completed too late to see any significant service in the American War of Independence. She then spent most of the years of peace in British waters. She sailed to Jamaica in 1791, but was laid up in Deptford in November 1792, and did not return to service before being sold in 1795. Daniel Bennett purchased her, had her almost rebuilt, and then employed her as a whaler in the Southern Whale Fishery. A French privateer captured her in 1803 as Flirt was returning to Britain from a whaling voyage.

== Royal Navy ==
Commander Nathan Brunton commissioned Flirt for the North Sea in March 1782. She was then paid off in 1783, but recommissioned in April under Commander William Luke and stationed between Beachy Head and the Isle of Wight. She remained on that station through the tenure of her next two captains.

Flirt was paid off in 1786 before Commander Piercy Brett recommissioned her in May. Commander John Stevens Hall replaced Brett in 1788, only to have Commander James Norman replace him in 1789. Norman recommissioned her in May 1790 for the Spanish Armament. George Bass, who would go on to achieve fame as an explorer, qualified as a surgeon for a first-rate (as a 13-year old), but his first appointment was to Flirt.

Commander James Nicoll Morris recommissioned Flirt in May 1790 for the Channel. He sailed her for Jamaica on 22 November 1791. However, after she returned to Britain she was laid up at Deptford in November 1792.

The Principal Officers and Commissioners of His Majesty's Navy offered the "Hull of His Majesty's Sloop Flirt. Burthen 200 tons, copper fastened, with Copper on her Bottom", for sale at Deptford on 1 December 1795. Flirt sold on that day for £450.

== Whaler ==
Daniel Bennett, the owner of several whalers purchased Flirt and had her almost rebuilt in 1796.

Captain Thomas Dennis first sailed Flirt in the South Seas Whale Fishery in 1796. Between 1796 and 1801 she was reported to be whaling off Walvis Bay. During this period she returned to Britain in January 1798, but sailed again on 2 February for the East Coast of Africa. By May was in Rio de Janeiro replenishing her supplies of water and provisions. She then returned to Britain on 16 November 1799.

On 20 November 1799 Captain Gardner sailed to East Coast of Africa. Flirt left St Helena in August 1800 and was back in London by 16 October.

Captain T. Bunker was reported at Walwich Bay (Walvis Bay) in August 1801. She returned to Britain 4 December.

In 1802 she was again whaling off the East Coast of Africa. At the time she was valued at £8,000.

In August 1802, the Honourable the Court of Directors of the East India Company announced that they had licensed 19 vessels, Albion, Charming Kitty, and Flirt among them, to sail east of the Cape of Good Hope to engage in whaling in the "Southern Whale Fishery".

In 1802 "Warren" replaced Bennett as owner of Flirt. At the time her captain was J. Anthony. This arrangement of Warren as owner and J. Anthony as master continued into 1803.

== Capture ==
In June 1803, the French privateer captain François Aregnaudeau took command of the 32-gun 550-ton corvette Blonde, from Bordeaux. He had a successful cruise, most notably capturing the East Indiaman Culland's Grove on 22 July. He also captured Flirt as she was returning to London from whaling. On 3 August Aregnaudeau took both prizes into Pasajes.
