= HMS Adventure (1771) =

1771 Royal Navy barque

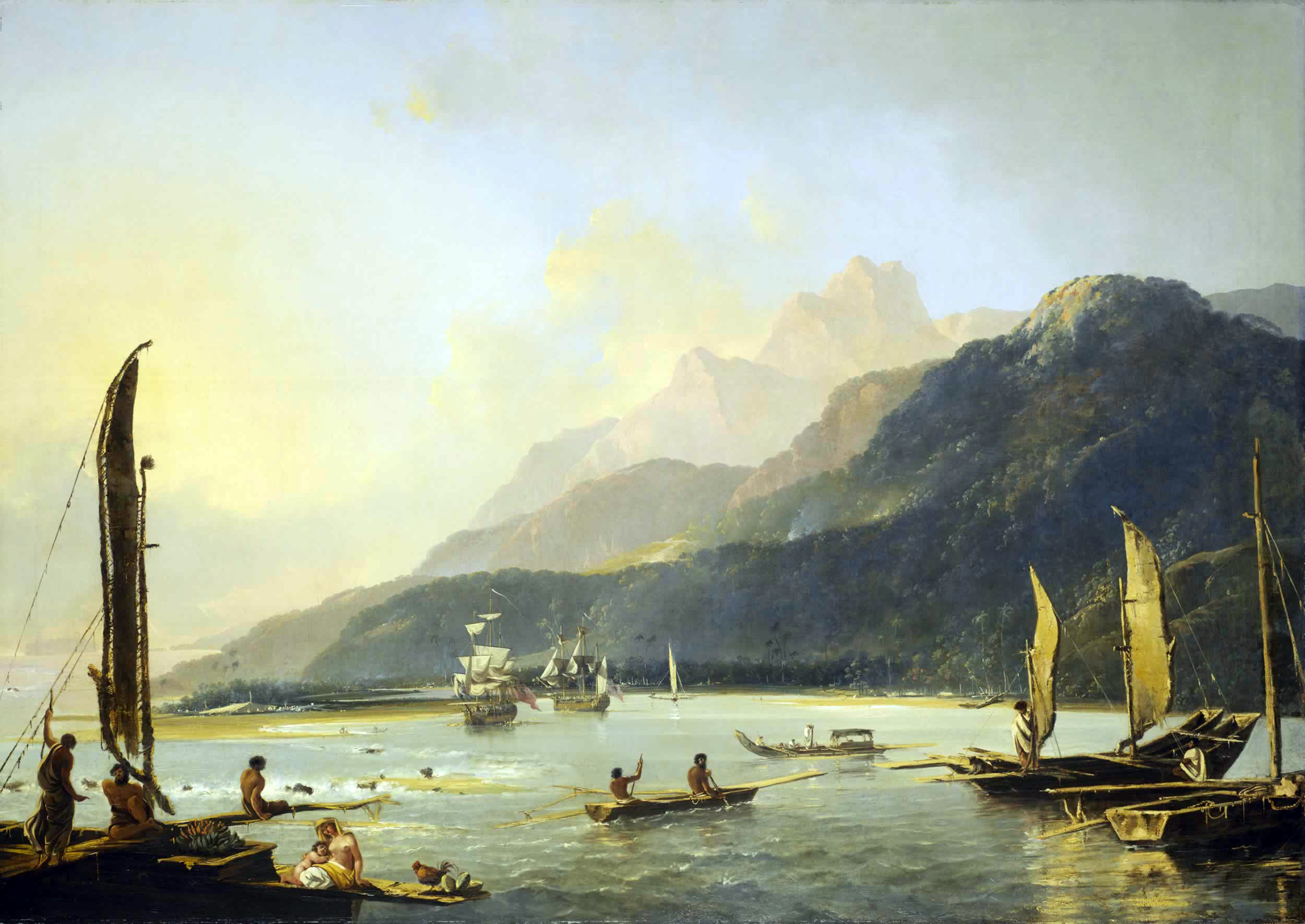
- Resolution and Adventure with fishing craft in Matavai Bay by William Hodges, painted 1776, shows the two ships at anchor in Tahiti.

History

Great Britain
- Name: Marquis of Rockingham
- Owner: Captain William Hammond, of Hull
- Builder: Thomas Fishburn, Whitby
- Launched: 1769, or 1770
- Fate: Sold to Royal Navy, November 1771

Great Britain
- Name: HMS Raleigh
- Operator: Royal Navy
- Acquired: 27 November 1771
- Renamed: HMS Adventure (25 December 1771)
- Fate: Sold to original owner in May 1783

Great Britain
- Name: Adventure
- Owner: Captain William Hammond, of Hull
- Acquired: May 1783 by purchase
- Fate: Sunk in the Saint Lawrence River in May 1811

General characteristics
- Tons burthen: 33641/94 (bm)
- Length: 99 ft 3 in (30.3 m) (overall); 76 ft 9 1/2 in (23.4 m) (keel)
- Beam: 28 ft 4 in (8.6 m)
- Depth of hold: 13 ft (4.0 m)
- Propulsion: Sail
- Sail plan: Barque
- Range: Limited only by water and provisions
- Complement: 80
- Armament: Royal Navy: 10 × 4-pounder guns + 8 × 1/2-pounder swivel guns; 1811: 6 × 6-pounder guns

HMS Adventure was a barque that the Royal Navy purchased in 1771. She had been the merchant vessel Marquis of Rockingham, launched in 1770 at Whitby. In naval service she sailed with Resolution on James Cook's second expedition to the Pacific in 1772–1775. She was the first ship to circumnavigate the globe from west to east. After her return she served as a store ship until 1779. The navy sold her in 1783 and she resumed a civilian career, but retaining the name Adventure. She was lost in May 1811.

== Career ==
She began her career as the North Sea collier Marquis of Rockingham, launched at Whitby in 1770.

Soon after his return from his first voyage in 1771, Commander Cook was commissioned by the Royal Society of London to make a second voyage in search of a supposed southern continent, Terra Australis Incognita. He arranged for the Navy to purchase two ships, the second and smaller of which was Marquis of Rockingham.

The Navy purchased her in 1771 and first named her Raleigh or Rayleigh, and then Adventure. The Navy commissioned her under Joseph Shank.

Cook was given the command of Resolution, with Commander Tobias Furneaux accompanying him in Adventure, having replaced Shank. Furneaux was an experienced explorer, having served on Samuel Wallis's circumnavigation in Dolphin in 1766–1768.

Resolution and Adventure left Plymouth on 13 July 1772 and on 17 January 1773 were the first European ships to cross the Antarctic Circle. On 8 February 1773 the two ships became separated in a fog and Furneaux directed Adventure towards the prearranged meeting point of Queen Charlotte Sound (New Zealand), charted by Cook in 1770.

On the way to the rendezvous, Adventure surveyed the southern and eastern coasts of Tasmania (then known as Van Diemen's Land), where Adventure Bay was named for the ship. Furneaux made the earliest British chart of this shore, but as he did not enter Bass Strait he assumed Tasmania to be part of Australia. Most of his names here survive; Cook, visiting this shore-line on his third voyage, confirmed Furneaux's account and delineation of it, and named after him the islands in Banks Strait.

Adventure arrived at Queen Charlotte Sound on 7 May 1773 and Resolution followed on 17 May. From June to October the two ships explored the southern Pacific, reaching Tahiti on 15 August, where Omai of Ra'iatea embarked on Adventure (Omai later became the first Pacific Islander to visit Europe before returning to Tahiti with Cook in 1776). After calling at Tonga in the Friendly Islands the ships returned to New Zealand but were separated by a storm on 22 October. This time the rendezvous at Queen Charlotte Sound was missed — Resolution departed on 26 November, four days before Adventure arrived. Cook had left a message buried in the sand setting out his plan to explore the South Pacific and return to New Zealand. Furneaux decided to return home and buried a reply to that effect.

Before he could leave, a fight broke out between Adventure's crew and the local Māori people, in which ten crewmen and two Māoris were killed. This was reportedly prompted by an unknowing breach of tapu by a sailor, who placed a tin can that had held food on a chief's head. Alternatively, it may have been due to a barter gone wrong at Grass Cove on 17 Dec. 1773, and Kahura taking revenge (utu). Adventure set out for home on 22 December 1773 via Cape Horn, She returned to England on 14 July 1774 and entered the double dock in the Royal Dockyard at Deptford where between March and May 1775 she was converted into a store ship for Halifax, Canada.

Lieutenant John Hallum recommissioned Adventure in March 1775. He sailed for North America on 26 June 1775. In November 1777 Lieutenant Hugh Tolken replaced Hallum at Boston. Between January and March 1779 she underwent refitting at Deptford Dockyard.

Henry Trubshaw Bell, coxswain of HMS Robust was appointed as bosun on 30 August 1779, at Halifax. The log for 5 September 1779 shows that "this day 8 men deserted the ship. Ditto took two of them again by information and confined them in irons".

Adventure set sail from Halifax on 26 October 1779, in company with the ships Keppel, Royal Briton and Dunmore. She sailed mainly in fresh or hard gales for most of the 36 days it took to reach Spithead, which is situated at the eastern part of the channel between Hampshire, England, and the Isle of Wight at Portsmouth. The voyage was not without its tensions. The log records that on 6 December 1779, the Captain "punished William Pritt with two dozen lashes for striking the boatswain and carpenter". Adventure arrived at Sheerness in December 1779, and was paid off on 13 January 1780. She underwent fitting as a fireship, but was never employed in that role.

Adventure was laid up at Sheerness until the Navy sold her on 7 May 1783 for £900, apparently to her original owners.

== Merchantman ==
In 1784 an Adventure, of 350 tons (bm), British-built, entered Lloyd's Register (LR). Her trade was London-Davis Strait, signalling that she was a whaler in the northern whale fishery.

Year	Master	Owner	Trade	Source & notes
1784	J.M'Leod	J.Montgomerie	London-Davis Strait	LR; good repair 1784
1787	J.M'Leod; John Burn	J.Montgomery	London-Davis Strait	LR; good repair 1784
1790	John Burn; Stevenson	J.Montgomery	London-Greenland	LR; good repair 1784, repairs 1787 & 1790

She was last listed in 1794.

Adventure reappeared in Lloyd's Register (LR) in 1800 with H. Lisk, master, T.Brown, owner, and trade London transport.

Year	Master	Owner	Trade	Source & notes
1801	H.Lesk	T.Brown	London transport	LR; good repairs 1795 & repairs 1797
1806	Appleton	T.Brown	Hull–Memel	LR;repairs 1795, good repairs 1798, & small repairs 1803
1811	J.Shaw; Snowden	Appleton	Hull–St Johns	LR; repairs 1803; good repairs 1795, 1798, & 1810

== Fate ==
On 24 May 1811, Adventure, Snowden, master, was sailing between Leith and Quebec when she was wrecked in the Saint Lawrence River. All her crew were saved.
