= Trincadour =

19th century coasting vessel

Trincadour (from the Portuguese troingador), was a type of small, undecked, flat-bottomed, coasting vessel with a raised bow. Trincadours had two or three lug sails on horizontal yards, or lateen sails. In the 18th and early 19th centuries, they were common in the Bay of Biscay, though they would often be found in the Mediterranean. The French Navy of the time purchased some for various purposes and had several built to use as gunboats.

On 24 February 1801 HMS Speedy captured the French naval brig Caroline, of four guns, which had been carrying ordnance stores from Genoa to Alexandria. French records report that Caroline was a biscayenne or trincadour commissioned at Lorient in June 1798, of only six tons (displacement; French), and a crew of 24 men. She originally was armed with one 36-pounder obusier. She was carrying despatches from Egypt when Speedy captured her in the Bay of Tunis.
