= François Aregnaudeau =

French privateer captain

François Aregnaudeau (sometimes written "Aregneaudeau") (Nantes, 22 August 1774 – disappeared with Duc de Dantzig around 1812) was a French privateer captain.

== Career ==
Aregnaudeau was born on 22 August 1774 to Louis Aregnaudeau, a merchant, and Catherine-Jacquette-Victoire Boivin.

Aregnaudeau started his career in April 1793, aged 18, on Sans-Culotte, a privateer chasse-marée from Nantes, under Captain Plukett. From 21 December 1796 to 15 May 1797, he commanded Sans-Culotte with the rank of enseigne de vaisseau non-entretenu for the French Navy.

Around July 1798, Aregnaudeau was 4th officer on the privateer Sandwich, under Aimé Durand, taking part in the capture of Marguerite, Bernstorff, and Williams.

In 1799, commanding Heureux Spéculateur, Aregnaudeau captured several ships off Dartmouth, notably two transports loaded with iron bars and three merchantmen valued at 1.5 million francs.

In June 1803, Aregnaudeau took command of the 550-ton corvette Blonde, from Bordeaux, with 32 guns (24 or twenty-six 8-pounders and 8 or six 6-pounders). On 22 July 1803, he captured Culland's Grove, valued at 2.5 million francs in insurance money. She was an "extra ship" for the British East India Company and was returning from Bengal with a valuable cargo. Aregnaudeau on 3 August took her and Flirt, a former Royal Navy brig but now a whaling ship that was returning to London from the South Seas Fisheries, into Pasajes.

On 24 February 1804, Blonde departed from Santander, Spain, and in the following days captured Diana, Eclipse, Sally and Rebecca, Rollindson, and Zephir.

On 24 March 1804, Blonde encountered an eight-ship convoy escorted by the corvette Wolverine. Aregnaudeau attacked Wolverine and forced her to surrender. Wolverine sank almost immediately after striking. While Blonde's crew was busy rescuing the survivors, the convoy attempted to escape. Still, Blonde managed to capture two ships, Nelson and Union. Denis Decrès ordered that the most deserving crew members of Blonde be honoured; Aregnaudeau received a sword of honour from the merchants of Bordeaux, and on 18 July 1804 he was made a Knight in the Legion of Honour.

On 16 August 1804, at coordinates 47°30′N 12°20′W, Blonde encountered the frigate HMS Loire. After a chase of 20 hours, including a running fight of a quarter of an hour, during which the British had one midshipman and five men wounded, and the French lost two men killed and five wounded, Blonde struck. Loire took her prize in tow to Plymouth where the prisoners were disembarked on 31 August.

After several years in captivity, Aregnaudeau was exchanged and resumed his career on the lugger Actif, capturing an American merchantman, and later the brig Joséphine. In these cruises, Aregnaudeau notably capturing two ships, one valued at 40,000 and the other at 100,000 piasters.

In October 1810, François Aregnaudeau assumed command of Duc de Dantzig. On 20 November he captured Ceres, on 4 December the British Bonetta, and a few days later the American Cantone and the British Jane in the Gulf of Mexico. Damaged by a heavy sea, Duc de Dantzig had to throw her guns overboard to remain afloat and returned to harbour. She set sail again on 18 June 1811, arriving in New York on 28 August with a British prize that the US government seized. By October 1811, Aregnaudeau had captured Planter, from London, Tottenham, and a Spanish schooner.

Aregnaudeau and Duc de Dantzig were last heard of on 13 December 1811, when the privateer Gazelle reached Morlaix and reported on her activities.

== Ghost ship ==
The fate of Duc de Dantzig became a matter of speculation: she was said to have succumbed to a British frigate in a night encounter, or to a hurricane. A fantastic tale, quoted by Napoléon Gallois, states that a French frigate encountered a ghost ship, an unmanned vessel drifting in the ocean. When a party from the frigate boarded the drifting ship to investigate, the boarders found the ship to be covered in pools of dried blood, with putrefied corpses with deep wounds crucified to the masts and in the battery; bloody papers identified the wreck as Duc de Dantzig. More soberly, the ships' register of the maritime archives states "Duc de Dantzig, unheard of as of 1813, presumed lost with all hands".

== Family ==
On 12 May 1798, Aregnaudeau married Louise-Jeanne Briand. They had five children: Aglaé (3 December 1798 – 22 January 1881); Émile (18 February 1800 – 10 December 1860), who rose to the rank of commander in the French Navy and Knight in the Legion of Honour; Égérie (14 January 1803 – ?); Amédée (24 May 1808 – 20 July 1818); and Jules (16 January 1811 – ?), who died in the Caribbean while in command of a merchantman from Marseilles.
