= HMS Speedy (1782) =

Speedy-class brig sloop of the Royal Navy

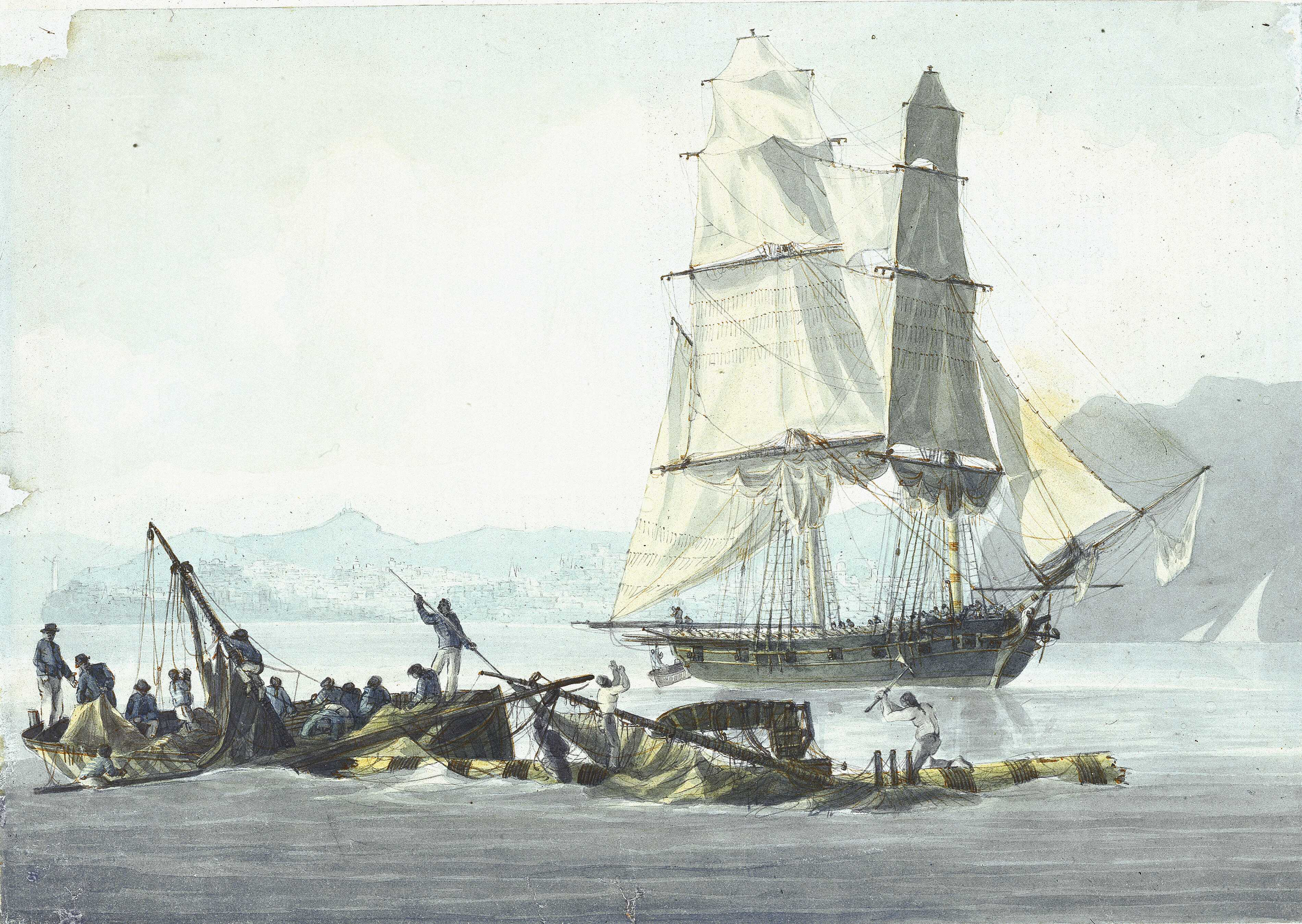
- HMS Speedy falling in with the wreck of HMS Queen Charlotte, 21 March 1800

History

Great Britain
- Name: HMS Speedy
- Ordered: 23 March 1781
- Builder: Thomas King, Dover, Kent
- Cost: £4,200.7s.3d
- Laid down: June 1781
- Launched: 29 June 1782
- Completed: By 25 October 1782
- Captured: By the French on 9 June 1794

France
- Name: Speedy
- Acquired: 9 June 1794
- Captured: 25 March 1795, by the Royal Navy

Great Britain
- Name: HMS Speedy
- Acquired: Retaken on 25 March 1795
- Captured: By the French on 3 July 1801

France
- Name: Saint Paul
- Acquired: 3 July 1801
- Out of service: Donated to the Papal Navy in December 1802

Papal States
- Name: San Paolo
- Acquired: December 1802
- Fate: Struck c.1806

General characteristics
- Class & type: 14-gun Speedy-class brig
- Tons burthen: 20721/94 (bm)
- Length: 78 ft 3 in (23.9 m) (overall); 59 ft 0 1/2 in (18.0 m) (keel)
- Beam: 25 ft 9 in (7.8 m)
- Depth of hold: 10 ft 10 in (3.3 m)
- Propulsion: Sails
- Sail plan: brig
- Complement: 90
- Armament: 14 × 4-pounder guns + 12 × 1/2-pounder swivel guns

HMS Speedy was a 14-gun Speedy-class brig sloop of the Royal Navy. Built during the last years of the American War of Independence, she served with distinction during the French Revolutionary Wars.

Built at Dover, Kent, Speedy spent most of the interwar years serving off the British coast. Transferred to the Mediterranean after the outbreak of the French Revolutionary Wars, she spent the rest of her career there under a number of notable commanders, winning fame for herself in various engagements and often against heavy odds. Her first commander in the Mediterranean, Charles Cunningham, served with distinction with several squadrons, assisting in the capture of several war prizes, such as the French frigates Modeste and Impérieuse. His successor, George Cockburn, impressed his superiors with his dogged devotion to duty. Speedy's next commander, George Eyre, had the misfortune to lose her to a superior French force on 9 June 1794.

She was soon retaken, and re-entered service under Hugh Downman, who captured a number of privateers between 1795 and 1799 and fought off an attack by the large French privateer Papillon on 3 February 1798. His successor, Jahleel Brenton, fought a number of actions against Spanish forces off Gibraltar. Her last captain, Lord Cochrane, forced the surrender of the much larger Spanish frigate El Gamo. A powerful French squadron captured her again in 1801 and Napoleon donated her to the Papal Navy the following year. She spent five years with the Papal Navy under the name San Paolo; she was struck around 1806.

== Design and construction ==
Speedy was one of two brig-sloops built to the same design by Thomas King of Dover, Kent. She and her sister ship HMS Flirt were constructed to provide small, fast escort vessels with hulls shaped like a cutter, rather than the more seaworthy but slower ship-sloop. King had for some time specialised in these types of vessels, and the design capitalised on that experience. Speedy was so named to symbolise this new approach. Ordered on 23 March 1781, she was laid down at King's yard in June that year and launched on 29 June 1782. She moved to Deptford, Kent, to be fitted-out and have her hull covered with copper plates between 16 July and 25 October 1782; at her completion she had cost £4,200 7s 3d to build.

== Early career ==
Speedy was commissioned under Commander Josias Rogers in May 1783 and was assigned to serve in the North Sea, operating out of the Humber estuary. (Note: During the period Speedy was commissioned, a sloop was an unrated ship with between 10 and 18 guns commanded by a commissioned sea officer with the rank of master and commander. After 1794 the rank was shortened to commander, which was considered equivalent to a major in the Army.) After four years on this station she was paid off (placed in reserve) in January 1787 and began a refit at Woolwich in April that year. This work was completed by July at a cost of £1,801 (equivalent to £244,557 in 2025) and she was recommissioned in May that year under Commander John Maude, still on the Humber station.

From November 1790 she was under Commander Richard Lane, who was her captain until she was paid off in October 1791. Speedy then underwent another refit, this time at Deptford between June and December 1792, at a cost of £3,000 (equivalent to £385,928 in 2025), and was recommissioned in November 1792 under Commander Charles Cunningham.

== French Revolutionary Wars ==
Cunningham had previously been serving in the East Indies in command of the 16-gun sloop HMS Ariel. By the time he returned to take up his new command the French Revolutionary Wars had broken out and he was sent to join Lord Hood's fleet in the Mediterranean, arriving there in April 1793. He was largely employed in carrying despatches and maintaining communications with other ships scattered throughout the Mediterranean ports. On 5 October 1793 Speedy accompanied HMS Bedford and HMS Captain into Genoa, where they captured a French frigate, Modeste, and two armed tartanes in the Raid on Genoa. In this action, Speedy sent two boats to board the tartanes while Bedford bombarded Modeste. The French crews of the tartanes attempted to resist and two of their crewmembers were wounded, but the British did not suffer any casualties. Captain and Speedy then sailed to the Gulf of Spezia where they caught another French frigate, Imperieuse, at anchor. Imperieuse was scuttled by her crew, but was subsequently salvaged and recommissioned as HMS Imperieuse. Cunningham was promoted to captain and given command of the prize, with his commission backdated to the day of the capture, 12 October 1793.

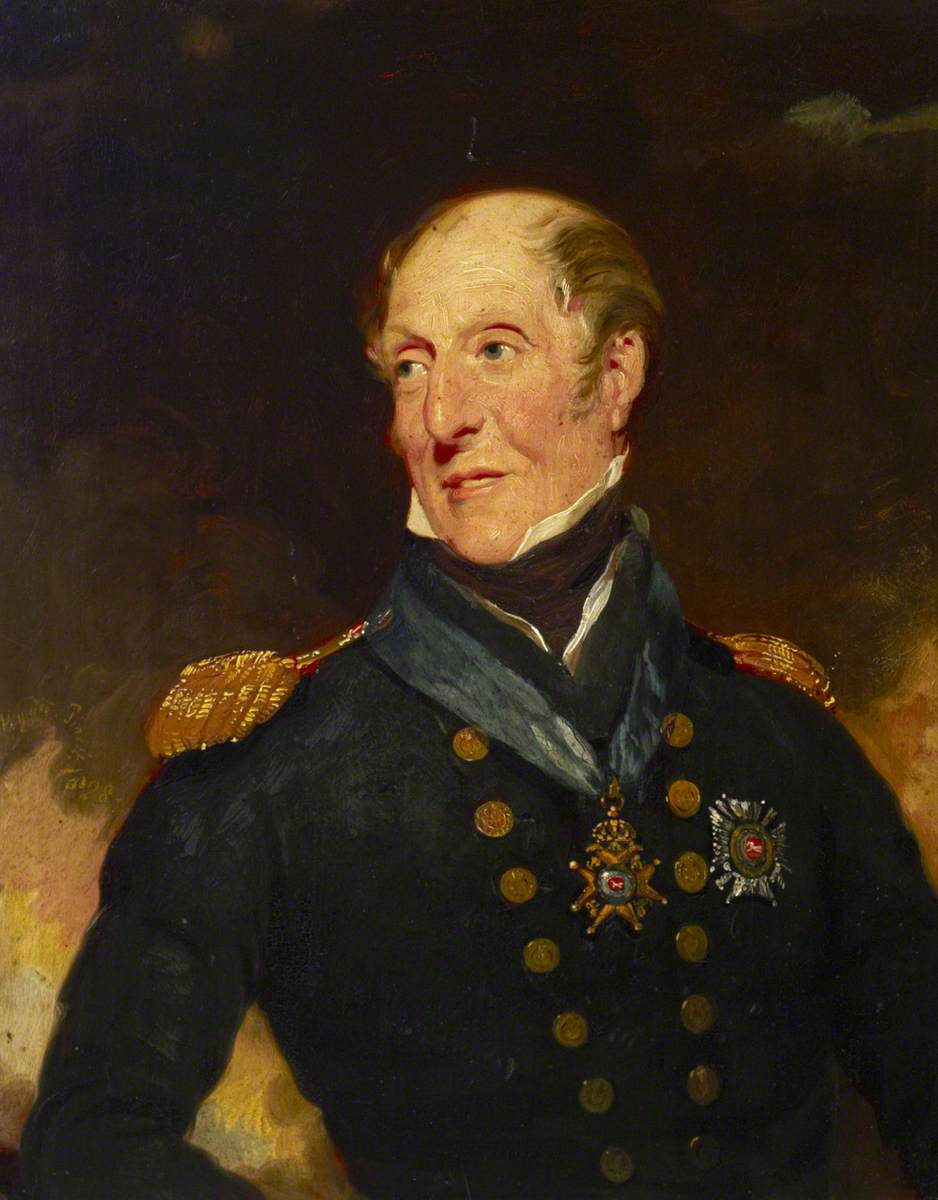
Charles Cunningham, Speedy's commander at the start of the French Revolutionary Wars

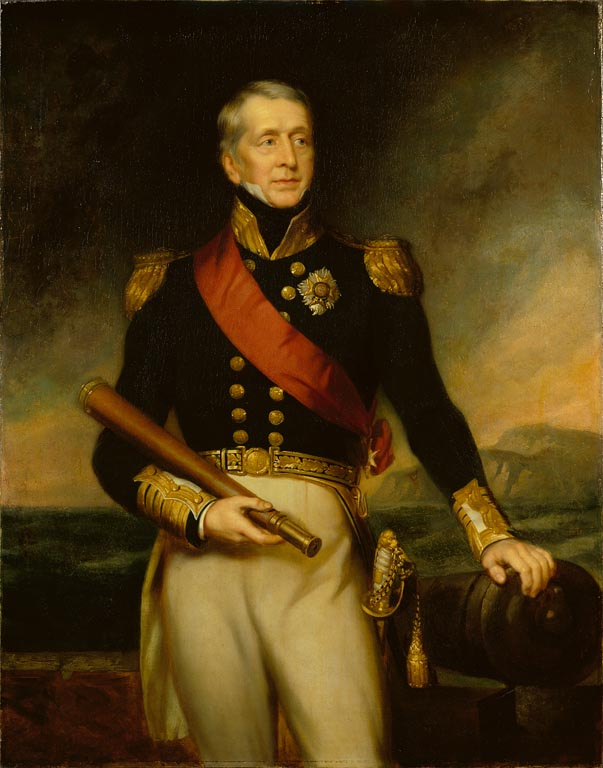
George Cockburn, Speedy's fifth commander who rose to the rank of admiral of the fleet

Cunningham was replaced by Commander George Cockburn in the command of Speedy, which remained in the Mediterranean. His first duties were limited to carrying despatches and passengers between Toulon and Genoa, after which he was ordered to join Captain Sutherland of HMS Diadem, who was commanding a squadron blockading Genoa. The small fleet was caught in winter storms and several ships were badly damaged, forcing Sutherland and his squadron to seek shelter in nearby ports and to make repairs, with the exception of Speedy, which remained on station. Sutherland put into Hyères Bay and reported the dispersal of his squadron to Lord Hood, also noting that nothing had been heard of Speedy since the gales. Once Diadem had been repaired Sutherland returned to Genoa, and was surprised to discover Speedy still there patrolling the port, not once having left her task. While single-handedly maintaining the blockade, she had managed to capture several vessels. Sutherland ordered Speedy, which was by now running desperately short of water, to Hyères to refit. At the same time, Sutherland sent a complimentary report of Cockburn to Lord Hood. On 20 January 1794, Cockburn was rewarded with an acting commission as post-captain of the frigate HMS Inconstant, followed a month later by a permanent command of the frigate HMS Meleager.

Commander George Eyre took over command of Speedy in February 1794. Speedy supported the siege and capture of Bastia, after which Eyre was ordered to join Diadem off Nice. While making his way there on 9 June, he ran into a French fleet under Rear-Admiral Pierre Martin, which had sailed from Toulon several days earlier. Eyre attempted to escape, but the wind and sea favoured the larger vessels, and Speedy was chased down and captured. Eyre was brought aboard Admiral Martin's flagship and was told that the National Convention had recently ordered that no quarter should be given to the English or Hanoverians, and that had Martin's ship been first alongside, he would have sunk Speedy. The sudden appearance of a British fleet curtailed the interview, and the French hurried back to Gourjean roadstead outside Toulon, taking Speedy and the captured British crew with them. (Note: The defeat of the French fleets by Lord Howe at the Glorious First of June and the subsequent acquisition of large numbers of French prisoners caused the French to abandon the policy of guerre à mort, lest their own men also be shown no quarter. Eyre endured a harsh captivity, but was repatriated, continued to rise through the ranks and died an Admiral and a Knight Commander of the Bath.)

== Recapture ==
Speedy spent only a brief time sailing under the French flag. On 25 March 1795 her captain mistook Captain Thomas Fremantle's Inconstant for a French ship and she was recaptured and taken back into British service.

In early March the following year, Speedy, under the command of Thomas Elphinstone, joined a squadron cruising off Oneglia, Italy, under Commodore Horatio Nelson, consisting of the 64-gun ships HMS Agamemnon and HMS Diadem, the 32-gun frigates HMS Meleager and HMS Blanche and the ship-sloop HMS Peterel. On 25 April the squadron steered for Laöna bay, the commodore having received intelligence that a large convoy, laden with stores for the French army, had anchored off the town of Finale. When the squadron arrived, however, they found only four vessels moored under the guns of some batteries. The shore batteries opened fire on Peterel as she led the boats of the squadron to the attack. Despite the fire, the British were able to capture the four vessels and suffered only three men wounded.

In an action on 31 May the squadron chased the French ketch Genie, a gunboat of one gun, and five merchant ships, which took refuge near the guns of a shore battery. At 3p.m. Agamemnon, Blanche, Peterel and Speedy approached them and anchored in 4 fathoms (7.3 m) of water. The four British ships fired their cannons, which disabled the shore battery, and then sent in several boats under heavy fire from the guns of Genie and the gunboat; the British successfully boarded and captured both ships. In the meantime, the merchant ships had beached themselves to avoid capture. Under heavy musket fire from the beach, the British captured and re-floated the four merchant vessels, and destroyed one. Among the British, one man was killed and three were wounded in the operation.

== Downman and Brenton ==
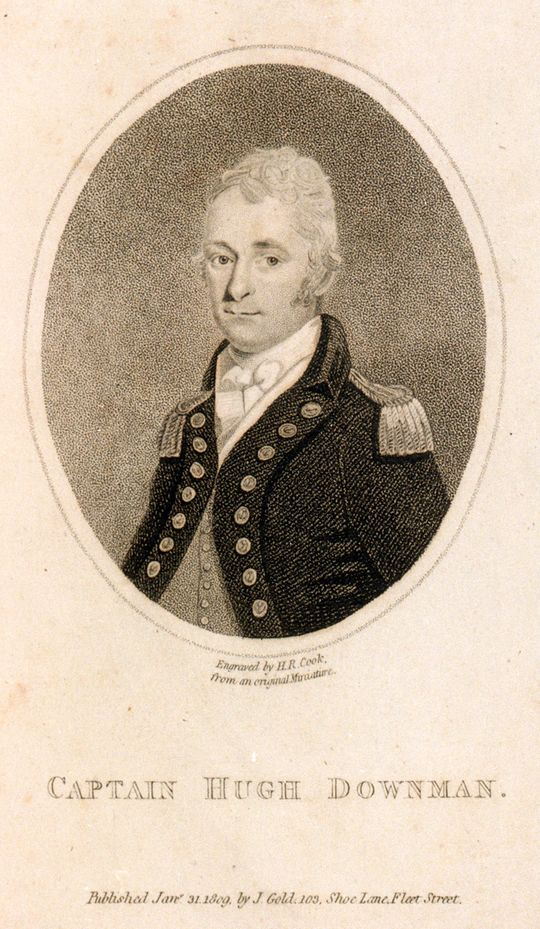
Hugh Downman, Speedy's commander between 1797 and 1799

Elphinstone was succeeded in August 1797 by Commander Hugh Downman, who made several cruises with Speedy. During his time in command of Speedy, Downman captured five privateers, altogether mounting 17 guns and 28 swivels, and carrying 162 men. These five were: Domine Lucas on 1 August, Palma on 13 September, Peregrinoon 21 December, Virgen de los Remedios (alias Olivia) on 1 January 1798, and San José (alias Garalin) on 15 March. Head money was finally paid in June 1829. (Note: A first-class share of the head money for each of the vessels was worth, in order, £39 10s 10d, £42 11s 7 1/4d, £28 17s 11 1/4d, £53 3s 5 3/4d, and £65 7s 11 1/2d. The pool for the claimants of the fifth class, comprising able and ordinary seamen, landsmen, and boys, was £26 7s 3d, £28 7s 9d, £15 5s 3 1/2d, £35 9s 8 1/2d, and £43 11s 11 1/2d.)

On 3 February 1798 Speedy encountered the large privateer Papillon, mounting 18 guns and carrying 160 men, while sailing off Vigo. Papillon attacked Speedy, which had a reduced crew; her master Mr Marshall and 12 men were aboard a Spanish prize Speedy had taken earlier. The two ships fought each other for two days; by the second day Downman had exhausted his supply of shot, and resorted to firing nails and pieces of iron hoop at his opponent. Having observed his captain's predicament, Marshall secured the Spanish crew below deck and took the prize crew off in a small boat to go to Downman's assistance. After a fierce fight Speedy succeeded in driving off Papillon; Speedy suffered losses of five killed and four wounded. Downman then recaptured his prize and returned to Lisbon to carry out repairs.

For his efforts in protecting British trade out of Porto, the merchants there presented him with a letter of thanks, and a piece of plate valued at £50. As a reward for his good service, Downman was advanced to post-captain on 26 December 1798 and appointed commander of the 32-gun HMS Santa Dorothea, a frigate that had recently been captured from the Spanish in the action of 15 July 1798.

Downman was succeeded in January of the following year by Commander Jahleel Brenton, who was based at Gibraltar. While sailing off Gibraltar in company with the British privateer Defender on 9 August 1799, Brenton came across three small Spanish warships, mounting twenty 6-pounders in total. The Spanish ran into a small sandy bay and anchored in a line so as to bring their guns to bear simultaneously on the British ships. Speedy and Defender sailed up and down for two hours firing broadsides, but without much effect. Defender only had 22 men on board and decided to sail further out to sea to meet one of her boats. Brenton thought the effort of keeping under sail was aiding the enemy, and anchored Speedy within 30 yards (27 m) of the middle ship. The two exchanged a fierce cannonade for three-quarters of an hour, after which the Spanish abandoned their ships and made for the shore. Two of the ships ran ashore and the third was immediately captured. Speedy launched her boats to recover the other two, coming under musket fire from the Spanish on the hillside as they did so. The British got both vessels off and took them into Gibraltar, along with two men wounded during the operation.

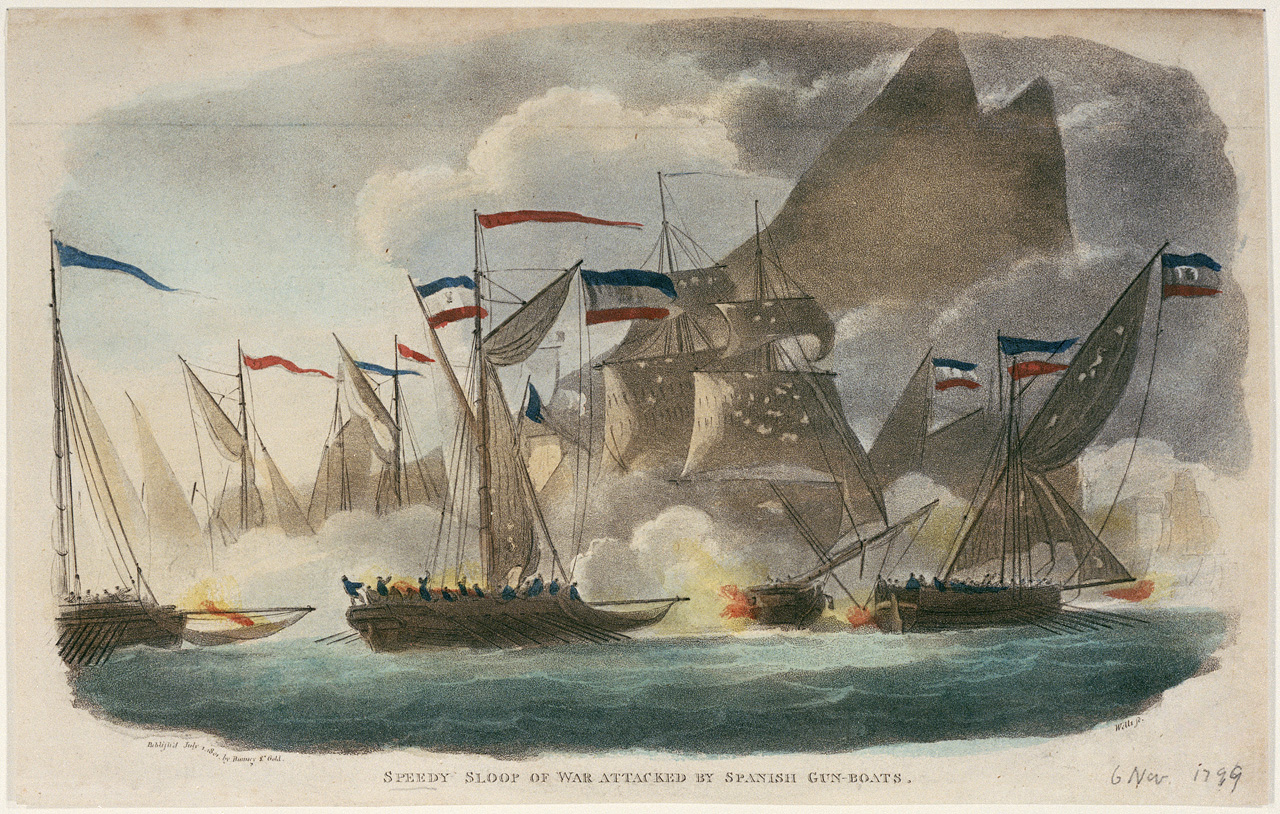
HMS Speedy fighting Spanish gunboats off Gibraltar in November 1799

On 3 October Speedy, while sailing once again off Gibraltar, spotted ten small ships coming out of Algeciras, gunboats apparently attempting to attack a British convoy that was then passing. Brenton identified the ships as merchantmen, attempting to evade the British at Gibraltar in the bad weather. On Speedy's approach, they scattered, four sheltering under a fort. Speedy approached and fired on them, causing their crews to abandon their ships. They were driven ashore by the wind, and despite sending boats out, it was impossible to get them off, so they were left to be reduced to wrecks. Three days later, Speedy was standing off Europa Point when twelve gunboats were sighted coming out of Algeciras to attack two merchant ships making their way past Gibraltar. One, the Unity, was carrying wine and spirits for the fleet. Their combined firepower far outweighed that of Speedy, but Brenton turned his ship towards them, covering the escape of one of the merchantmen with his fire. The gunboats were attempting to catch the Unity when Brenton took his ship through the flotilla, close enough to break many of their oars, maintaining a constant fire from his guns and with every spare member of the crew firing muskets. The Spanish flotilla broke and fled. Speedy suffered two men killed and one wounded, and sustained considerable damage to her rigging and below her waterline. She was unable to return to Gibraltar in the rising wind, and was forced to run along the coast to Tétouan Bay, where her shot-holes were plugged to allow her to make her way back. During the engagement with the gunboats, the guns in the fortress of Gibraltar had not fired in support of Speedy. When Brenton asked why, the Governor of Gibraltar, General Charles O'Hara, replied that he had arranged with the Governor of Algeciras for the guns never to be fired at the gunboats so as not to annoy the inhabitants of the town.

== Cochrane ==
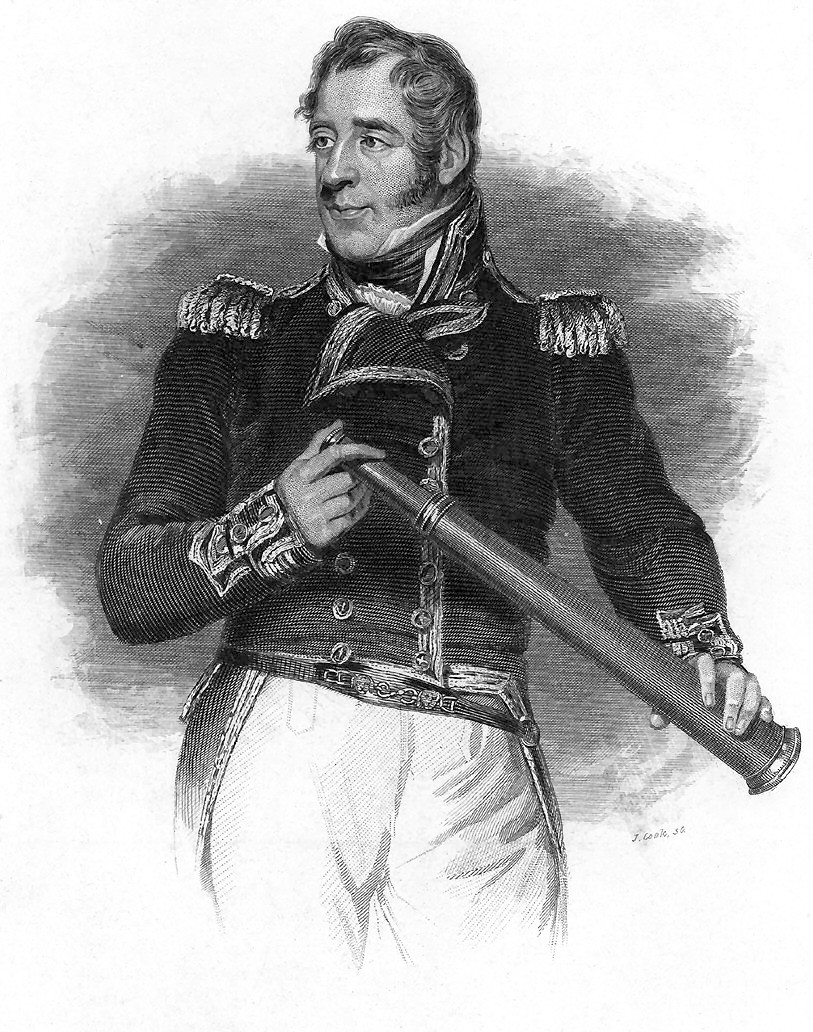
Commander Lord Cochrane achieved some of his most notable exploits with Speedy.

Brenton was promoted to post-captain, and in March 1800 Commander Lord Cochrane took over. Cochrane was less than impressed with his new command, declaring that Speedy was "little more than a burlesque of a vessel of war". His cabin had only 5 feet (1.5 m) of headroom; when Cochrane wished to shave he had to open a skylight and set his shaving equipment out on the quarterdeck. On another occasion he walked the quarterdeck with Speedy's entire broadside, seven pieces of four-pounder shot, in his pockets. In an attempt to increase the firepower of his new command he asked for and was given two 12-pounder long guns to use as bow and stern chasers, but the scantlings could not support them and they had to be removed. He then requested his 4-pounders be upgraded to 6-pounders, but his gunports were not big enough. He had better luck with his mast, taking a spar from HMS Genereux that was considered too large for Speedy, but which Cochrane felt improved her speed.

In early May Cochrane was escorting a convoy from Cagliari to Leghorn. On 11 May a ship which turned out to be the 6-gun privateer Intrépide was spotted capturing one of the merchant ships in the convoy, at which point Cochrane chased the Intrépide and forced her to surrender. Three days later, as the convoy passed the island of Montecristo, five rowing boats emerged from one of the island's coves and captured two of the rearmost merchant ships. Cochrane immediately gave chase, and recaptured them early the next morning. He was then given a free hand to raid enemy shipping in the area, and captured seven or eight vessels that June and July, including the 10-gun privateer Asuncion off Bastia on 25 June and the privateer Constitution off Caprea on 19 July. On 22 September he captured a large Neapolitan vessel and, on bringing her into Port Mahon, discovered that the Spanish had taken notice of his depredations and were preparing a frigate to capture Speedy.

Cochrane prepared for an encounter with this Spanish vessel by painting Speedy to resemble the Danish brig Clomer, then in the Mediterranean. He also appointed a Dane as quartermaster and found him a Danish naval officer's uniform. While cruising off Alicante on 21 December, Speedy encountered an enemy frigate, but tricked her into thinking she was a neutral vessel. Cochrane again used this false flag technique to his advantage; on 22 January he was sailing with a convoy of Danish merchantmen under a Danish flag, pretending to escort them. When a 10-gun French ship and 8-gun Spanish brig approached, Cochrane hoisted British colours and attacked, capturing both of them.

Then on 24 February Cochrane captured the French naval brig Caroline, of four guns, which had been carrying ordnance stores from Genoa to Alexandria. (Note: French records report that Caroline was a biscayenne or trincadour commissioned at Lorient in June 1798, of only six tons (French), and a crew of 24 men. She originally was armed with one 36-pounder obusier. She had been sent from Egypt with despatches and was captured in the Bay of Tunis.)

=== Speedy and Gamo ===
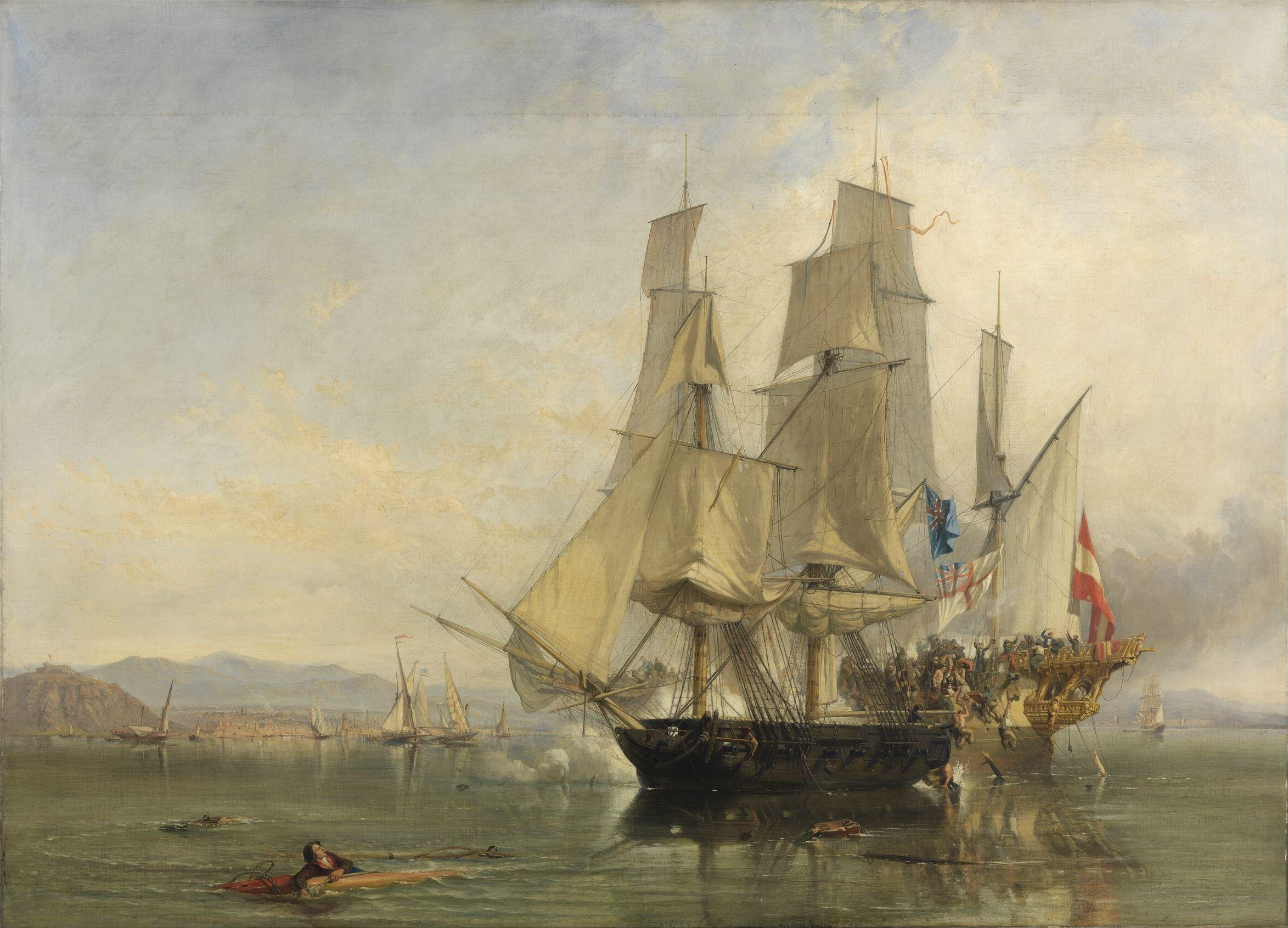
Speedy capturing El Gamo in the action of 6 May 1801

Speedy was cruising off Barcelona at dawn on 6 May 1801 when she sighted a large Spanish Navy warship, which turned out to be the xebec-frigate El Gamo, carrying 319 men and armed with 8- and 12-pounder guns and 24-pounder carronades. This amounted to a total broadside of 190 pounds, more than seven times that of Speedy. Furthermore, Cochrane had only 54 men on board; the rest were serving as prize crews. Instead of evading the frigate, Cochrane closed on her, and at 9:30 a.m. Gamo fired a gun and hoisted Spanish colours. In return Cochrane hoisted American colours. The Spanish hesitated, allowing Cochrane to get closer, hoist British colours, and evade the first broadside. Gamo fired another, which Cochrane again evaded, holding fire until Speedy ran alongside and locked her yards in Gamo's rigging. Gamo attempted to fire upon her smaller opponent, but her guns were mounted too high and could not be depressed sufficiently, causing their shot to pass through Speedy's sails and rigging. Cochrane on the other hand had mounted the front of his guns on blocks so they could fire upward through Gamo's sides. Cochrane then opened fire with his 4-pounders double- and treble-shotted, their shots passing up through the sides and decks; the first broadside killed the Spanish captain and boatswain.

Seeing their disadvantage the Spanish second-in-command assembled a boarding party, at which Cochrane drew off and pounded their massed ranks with shot and musket fire before drawing in close again. After having their attempts to board frustrated three times, the Spanish returned to their guns. Cochrane then decided to board the Gamo, and assembled his entire crew into two parties, leaving only the ship's doctor aboard. The British rushed Gamo, some boarding from the bow with faces blackened to look like pirates, the rest boarding from the waist. There was a hard-fought battle between the two crews, until Cochrane called down to the doctor, at the time the only person on Speedy, ordering him to send another 50 men over. At the same time he ordered the Spanish colours to be torn down. Thinking that their officers had surrendered the ship, the remaining Spanish seamen stopped fighting. The British had lost three men killed and nine wounded, while the Spanish had lost 14 killed and 41 wounded, a casualty list exceeding Speedy's entire complement. The British then secured the Spanish prisoners below deck and made their way back to Port Mahon. Stung that he had been beaten by such an inferior foe, the Spanish second-in-command asked Cochrane for a certificate assuring him that he had done all he could to defend his ship. Cochrane obliged, with the equivocal wording that he had "conducted himself like a true Spaniard". Cochrane was amused to learn that this certificate had later secured the Spanish officer further advancement. In 1847 the Admiralty awarded the Naval General Service Medal with clasp "Speedy 6 May 1801" to all surviving claimants from the action.

=== Later actions and capture ===
Cochrane returned to the coast off Barcelona in June 1801, and joined the 16-gun HMS Kangaroo in attacking a Spanish convoy of 12 merchant ships and five armed vessels anchored under the guns of a large tower. After a sharp action fought between the afternoon of 9 June and the morning of 10 June, the two ships sank or drove ashore all of the ships with the exception of three brigs, which they captured. Three weeks later he was cruising off Alicante when he encountered several merchant vessels, which ran ashore. Rather than wasting time trying to get them off, he burnt them, but in doing so attracted the attention of a foe vastly more powerful than the Gamo.

A formidable French squadron under the command of Rear-Admiral Charles-Alexandre Léon Durand Linois had left Toulon bound for Cádiz to collect reinforcements for Napoleon's army in Egypt. (Note: This consisted of the 80-gun ships Formidable and Indomptable, the 74-gun Desaix, and the 40-gun Muiron.) On 3 July they sighted and chased Speedy, and Cochrane ordered the guns, boats, and provisions thrown overboard to lighten the ship. The French caught up nonetheless, and after narrowly avoiding the broadside of Desaix, Cochrane struck his colours. The French squadron also captured vessel "Mahon Packet" at this time. He was taken aboard Desaix, where her captain, Christy-Pallière, recognised Cochrane's accomplishments by refusing to accept his sword. Cochrane was taken along with the fleet and watched the Battle of Algeciras Bay from Desaix. He and the crew of Speedy were later exchanged after the battle. On returning to Gibraltar he was court-martialled for the loss of his ship, and honourably acquitted. (Note: The court-martial was held aboard the 80-gun HMS Pompee on 18 July 1801. The President of the Court was Captain Charles Stirling, of Pompee, with Captain Richard Goodwin Keats of HMS Superb, Captain Samuel Hood of HMS Venerable, Captain Aiskew Hollis of HMS Thames and Captain Jahleel Brenton, former captain of Speedy, now commanding HMS Caesar.)

== French and Papal career ==
The French took Speedy to Toulon with the fleet, where she became a pawn in Napoleon's efforts at diplomacy with Pope Pius VII, whose presence he wanted at his coronation as emperor. Speedy, by now named Saint Paul and inscribed with the words "Donné par le premier consul Bonaparte au Pape Pie VII" ("Given by the First Consul Bonaparte to Pope Pius VII") in gilt letters on her poop cabin, sailed with an escort from Toulon on 14 December 1802 bound for Civitavecchia as a present to the Pope. She arrived there on 16 December where the Papal Navy took her into service under the name San Paolo. She remained there until being struck c.1806. (Note: San Paolo was one of two vessels that Napoleon gave to the Papal Navy at the same time. The other was the brand-new brig Colibri, which the French had renamed Saint Pierre.)

== HMS Sophie ==
Some of Speedy's later exploits under Cochrane were used in the plot of the novel Master and Commander, the first of Patrick O'Brian's Aubrey–Maturin series, though the ship described by O'Brian matches only Speedy's spar dimensions and armament, and is named HMS Sophie. Cochrane is replaced in the book by the fictional Jack Aubrey, who repeats many of Cochrane's real-life exploits including the defence of a convoy and the recapture of one of its merchants from a privateer, and the capture of a large Spanish frigate, based on the Gamo, but renamed Cacafuego for the novel.

== See also ==
- Papal Navy
