= HMS Wolverine (1798) =

Brig-sloop of the Royal Navy

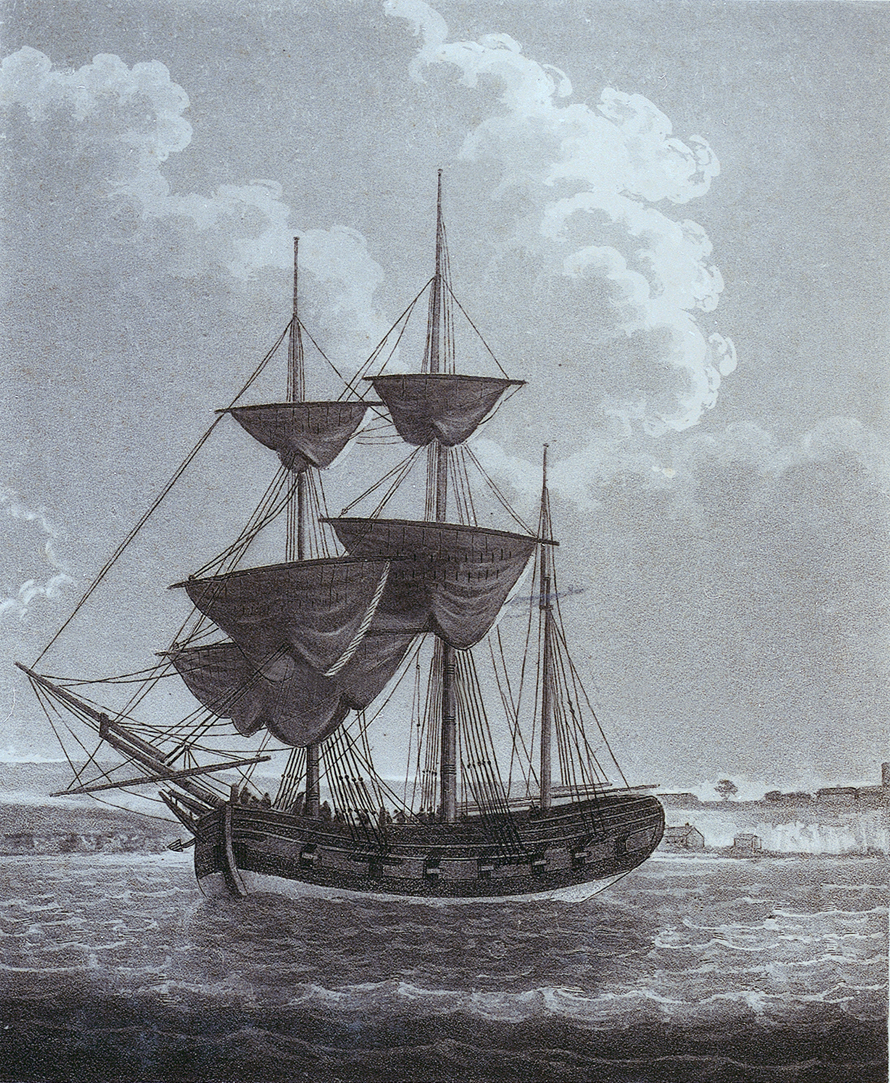
- Portrait of Wolverine

History

Great Britain
- Name: Rattler
- Launched: 1796
- Fate: Sold 1798

Great Britain
- Name: HMS Wolverine
- Acquired: March 1798 (by purchase)
- Honours and awards: Naval General Service Medal with clasp "Wolverine 13 Sept. 1799"
- Fate: Captured and sunk 24 March 1804

General characteristics
- Type: brig-sloop (ex-collier)
- Tons burthen: 286 (bm)
- Length: 98 ft (30 m) (overall); 71 ft (21.6 m) (keel)
- Beam: 27 ft 6 in (8.4 m)
- Propulsion: Sails
- Sail plan: Brig
- Complement: 70
- Armament: UD: 2 × 18-pounder guns + 6 × 24-pounder carronades; QD: 4 × 12-pounder carronades; Fc: 2 × 12-pounder carronades

HMS Wolverine (or Wolverene, or Woolverene), was a Royal Navy 14-gun brig-sloop, formerly the civilian collier Rattler that the Admiralty purchased in 1798 and converted into a brig sloop, but armed experimentally. She served during the French Revolutionary Wars and participated in one action that won for her crew a clasp to the Naval General Service Medal. A French privateer captured and sank Wolverine on 21 March 1804 whilst she was on convoy duty.

== Armament ==
Unusually for a brig-sloop, she was virtually a two-deck vessel as the waist between forecastle and quarterdeck was filled in to form a continuous flush deck. The upper deck below this flush deck carried six 24-pounder carronades and two 18-pounder long guns, all mounted on centreline pivots. The gun crews could fire their weapons to either side of the vessel by rotating the carriages along grooves set into the deck firing through the eight gunports on either side to accommodate these guns.

On the flush deck above she additionally carried six 12-pounder carronades (two forwards and four on the quarterdeck). The crews could also shift the carronades on her upper deck from side to side as required.

Captain John Schank, who was responsible for several other nautical innovations, devised this method of arming Wolverine.

== French Revolutionary Wars ==
Lieutenant Donald M'Dougall commissioned Wolverine on 28 April 1798. On 16 April 1798 command passed to the newly promoted Commander Lewis Mortlock. The next month Wolverine was part of the force under Admiral Home Popham that took part in the Ostend Raid that landed 1,300 troops under Major General Coote at Ostend in May. Shore batteries caused extensive damage to her and killed one seaman and one soldier, and wounded 10 seamen and five soldiers; the soldiers on Wolverene were from the 23rd Regiment of Foot. The army blew up the locks and gates on the Bruges canal but was then forced to surrender.

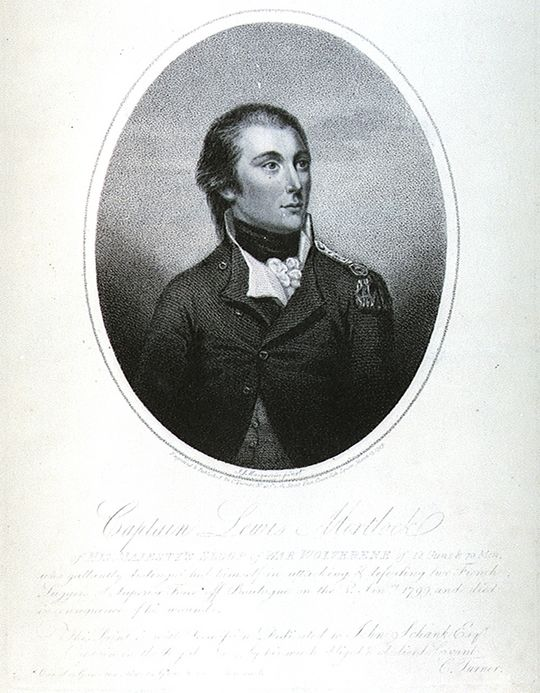
"Captain Lewis Mortlock of His Majesty's sloop of war Wolverene of 12 guns & 70 men, who gallantly distinguished himself in attacking & defeating two French luggers of Superior Force, one of 16 guns the other 14 guns & 140 men each, off Boulogne on the 3d Janry 1799 and died in consequence of his wounds. This print is with permission dedicated to John Schank Esq, Captain in the Royal Navy, by his much obliged & obedient servant C Turner", National Maritime Museum, Greenwich

On 28 June Wolverine was in company with the 50-gun fourth rate Romney, Plover, and Pilote, also later Daphne, and possibly the 24-gun post ship Champion, when they fell in with a Swedish convoy of 21 merchant vessels and their escort, 44-gun frigate. Sweden and Britain not then being at war, Captain Lawford of Romney shadowed the convoy while sending a lieutenant back to the Admiralty for instructions. On 30 June the lieutenant returned, but his instructions are now lost. Lawford decided to detain the Swedish merchant vessels, which he did, without the Swedish frigate intervening. Ultimately, the Swedish vessels sailed into Margate where they were held for some months before the authorities sent most on their way. Prize money for some part of the capture was paid in June 1804.

At the end of July Wolverine captured nine Dutch fishing boats off Ostend and brought them into the Downs.

On 14 October, Wolverine was in sight when the hired armed cutter Sandwich captured the Dutch hoy Hoop and her cargo.

=== 1799 ===
Wolverine was again in action on 3 January 1799 when she engaged the French luggers Furet and Rusé. The Furet carried fourteen 4-pounders and about 80 men, and was under the command of Citizen Denis Fourment; Rusé carried eight 4-pounders and about 70 men, and was under the command of Citizen Pierre Audibert. The men from both French vessels attempted to board Wolverine but the British repelled them. The French then threw incendiary devices though Wolverine's stern cabin windows and escaped while the British were extinguishing the fire. In all, Wolverine had two men killed, and eight, including Mortlock, wounded. Furet had five men killed, her captain and five men mortally and 10 men badly wounded. Rusé had her first and second lieutenants, another officer, and two seamen killed, and five mortally and several badly wounded.

Wolverine, under Lieutenant M'Dougall, sailed to Portsmouth, where she landed Mortlock on 6 January after contrary winds had forced her to spend 24 hours off the Isle of Wight. Mortlock died in his mother's arms at Gosport on 10 January, and was interred two days later after a funeral procession attended by every captain in the port. His large Newfoundland dog, which had stood beside him throughout the fight, escaped without a scratch.

Command of Wolverine was given to Captain John MacKellar, but on 24 January 1800 he was appointed to Charon. In late 1799 Lieutenant William Bolton became her new commander.

Between April and July Wolverine sailed in company with the 28-gun sloop Arrow and the Hired armed cutter Kent. Together, these three vessels captured a number of prizes. On 23 April they captured Blenie Rosetta. On 29 May they took Active and Providence. One month later, on 28 June, they captured five fishing boats. Then on 13 July they captured the Altona. Three days later they captured the Antony Wilhelm. Lastly, on 29 July, they captured the Nancy. (Note: On 20 January 1803 prize money resulting from the capture of the Blenie Rosetta, Active, Providence, five fishing boats, Altona, Antony Wilhelm, and Nancy was due for payment.)

Next, Wolverine was among the many British vessels that shared in the surrender of the Dutch Fleet at the Vlieter Incident.

On 9 September Vice-Admiral Mitchell detached Arrow and Wolverine to attack a ship and a brig belonging to the Batavian Republic and anchored under the Vlie at the entrance to the Texel. Arrow had to lighten ship and the following day they crossed over the Flack abreast of Wieringen and saw the enemy in the passage leading from Vlie Island towards Harlingen. On 12 September Wolverine anchored within 60 yards of the brig and only had to fire one gun before the brig hauled down her colours. She proved to be the Gier, armed with fourteen 12-pounders. Arrow exchanged broadsides with the ship, Draak, of 24 guns (six 50-pound brass howitzers, two 32-pounder guns, and sixteen long 18-pounder guns), which surrendered when Wolverine came up. Draak turned out to be a sheer hulk so Captain Bolton burnt her. The British also captured two schooners, each of four 8-pounder guns, and four schuyts, each of two 8-pounder guns. The Dutch prisoners numbered 380 men. In 1847 the Admiralty awarded the Naval General Service Medal with clasps "Arrow 13 Sept 1799" and "Wolverine 13 Sept. 1799" to any survivors of the two crews that claimed them.

Arrow and Wolverine weighed on 15 September and Wolverine went to take possession of a Batavian ship, the 24-gun Dolphin (Dolfijn), near Vlie which hoisted Orange colours as soon as the English came up. Two hundred and thirty prisoners were put aboard her and the command given to Lieutenant M'Dougall of Wolverine. Command of Gier, a brand new vessel, went to Lieutenant Gilmour of Arrow.

On Friday 26 September Wolverine and the gun-brigs Haughty and Piercer anchored near Espiegle, some 6 miles off Lemmer in West Friesland to organise an attack on the town the following morning. Captain Boorder of Espiegle had discovered that the enemy had 1,000 regular troops to defend the place and to augment the flotilla he had taken two schuyts that he had armed with two 6-pounders each from Espiegle. Early on Saturday morning Bolton sent Boorder ashore with the following letter: "Resistance on your part is in vain. I give you one hour to send away your women and children; if the town is not surrendered to the British arms for the Prince of Orange, your soldiers shall be buried in its ruins."

Commandant Van Groutten requested 24 hours delay but Bolton replied that if the Orange colours were not hoisted in half an hour, he was opening fire. Although his Dutch pilot insisted that the water was too shallow, Bolton pushed Wolverine through the oozy mud for two miles until he was a musket shot from the shore. Haughty and Piercer passed ahead until they grounded within a pistol shot of the pier, which had been reinforced with some 18-pounders from Dutch gunboats. Notwithstanding the flag of truce the enemy opened a heavy fire that the British squadron returned. The action continued for an hour until the soldiers fled from the town and a crew from Piercer's boat planted the British standard on the pier. Later the wind came round to the southward and freshened to a gale. Wolverine's bow was hove around with difficulty and by using a heavy press of sail she was dragged through the mud into 11 feet of water. Flatboats pulled the gunbrigs clear. On the Monday morning the enemy advanced towards the town along the northern causeway and Bolton sent word to warn Boorder. Because the town was nearly surrounded by water, a few men in flat boats were able to defend the place and the enemy were soon in retreat.

=== 1800 ===
In 1800 Lieutenant Jeffery Riegersfield took command, succeeded on 16 July by Lieutenant John Wight. On 10 August he sent into Portsmouth a prize, the Catherine of Bordeaux, laden with wine.

On the morning of 19 August he found that a part of an enemy convoy, consisting of two French gun-brigs and a cutter were attempting to escape from the mouth of the river Isigny and run along shore to the eastward. Supported by Sparkler and the gun-vessel Force, he went in pursuit. The enemy ran themselves ashore in Grand Camp, the entrance being commanded by batteries on either side, which Wolverine bombarded for nearly an hour. Lieutenant Stephens of Sparkler and Lieutenant Tokeley of Force covered Lieutenant Gregory of Wolverine who went in with the cutter and the jolly boat and a party of Royal Marines to board the largest vessel and set her on fire. They were under fire from three field pieces and about 200 men with muskets. The other vessel was completely shot through. The only casualties were three men on Wolverine who were burnt by an explosion of gunpowder. The enemy lost at least four men killed on the beach.

When Wolverine entered Portsmouth on 17 September she brought with her Neptunus, laden with naval stores, that Wight had captured when she was going into Havre de Grace. Wolverine shared the prize money with Oiseau and the cutter Fly.

On 2 November Wight discovered a French cutter under the land about 4 miles E. S. E. of Cape Barfleur light-house. He prevented her getting round the Cape and ran her ashore inside a reef of rocks under the village of Gouberville. She struck hard and because a gale was blowing up he assumed that she would be destroyed. Riegersfield again took temporary command.

=== 1801 ===
Wolverine, Loire, St Fiorenzo, Aggressor, Seahorse, Censor and the hired armed cutter Swift shared in the capture on 11 and 12 August 1801 of the Prussian brigs Vennerne and Elizabeth. Wolverine paid off and was put into ordinary on 29 April 1802, when Lieutenant Wight was promoted to commander.

== Loss ==
Wolverine was recommissioned in November 1803 under Lieutenant Henry Gordon. She then served as a convoy escort in the North Atlantic.

Wolverine was in action on 21 March 1804 with the French 30-gun privateer Blonde while on passage to Newfoundland with a convoy of eight merchantmen. Wolverine sighted two strange vessels. When it became clear that they were French frigates, Wolverine sent the convoy on its way and sailed to intercept the frigates. The larger of the two French frigates sailed to engage Wolverine, while the smaller one sailed after the merchantmen.

Wolverine was finally forced to surrender after an hour-long fight and losing five men killed and 10 wounded, one mortally. She was so badly damaged that she sank within a quarter-hour of her surrender, though the French rescued the surviving crew. Blonde, under François Aregnaudeau, out of a complement of 240 men and boys, lost only her first lieutenant mortally, and five of her men slightly wounded. The court martial on 17 August 1804 attributed Wolverine's loss on the defective state of her gun carriages – a mass of complicated timber and machinery – that the enemy's first two broadsides had rendered useless.

== Post script ==
HMS Loire captured Blonde five months later on 17 August. Also in August a letter arrived in Portsmouth from one of Wolverine's officers that reported that Wolverine's crew had been marched nearly 900 miles to Verdun from where they were landed. Captain Gordon and his officers were well, and had not been ill-treated.

Blonde's captain was François Aregnaudeau. He was captain of the privateer Duc de Dantzig, when she disappeared in 1812.
