= HMS Speedy (1828) =

Cutter of the Royal Navy

History

United Kingdom
- Name: Speedy
- Ordered: 1822
- Builder: Pembroke Dockyard
- Laid down: October 1827
- Launched: 28 June 1828
- Completed: 2 November 1828
- Commissioned: 2 November 1833
- Renamed: As YC.11, 1866
- Reclassified: As a mooring lighter, August 1853
- Fate: Broken up, 1876

General characteristics
- Class & type: Nightingale-class cutter
- Tons burthen: 123 bm
- Length: 63 ft 9 in (19.4 m) (gundeck); 46 ft 10 in (14.3 m) (keel)
- Beam: 22 ft 6 in (6.9 m)
- Draught: 10 ft 9 in (3.3 m)
- Depth: 9 ft 6 in (2.9 m)
- Sail plan: Fore-and-aft rig
- Complement: 34
- Armament: 2 × 6-pdr cannon; 4 × 6-pdr carronades

HMS Speedy was a 6-gun Nightingale-class cutter built for the Royal Navy during the 1820s. She was broken up in 1876.

== Description ==
Speedy had a length at the gundeck of 63 feet 9 inches (19.4 m) and 46 feet 10 inches (14.3 m) at the keel. She had a beam of 22 feet 6 inches (6.9 m), a draught of about 10 feet 9 inches (3.3 m) and a depth of hold of 9 feet 6 inches (2.9 m). The ship's tonnage was 123 tons burthen. The Nightingale class was armed with two 6-pounder cannon and four 6-pounder carronades. The ships had a crew of 34 officers and ratings.

== Construction and career ==
Speedy, the fourth ship of her name to serve in the Royal Navy, was ordered in 1822, laid down in November 1827 at Pembroke Dockyard, Wales, and launched on 28 June 1828. She was completed on 2 November 1828 at Plymouth Dockyard.
