= HMS Dolphins Prize =

HMS Dolphins Prize was a brig-sloop that was formerly the French privateer La Marquise de Cavalaire, captured by HMS Dolphin on 19 September 1757.
