= HMS Aberfoyle =

1912 ship's tender

History

United Kingdom
- Name: The Aberfoyle
- Owner: Lough Swilly Steamboat Co
- Builder: Philip & Son, Dartmouth
- Yard number: 407
- Launched: 1912
- Out of service: sold 1920
- Identification: Official Number 121359

United Kingdom
- Name: 1920–1938: Aberfoyle; 1938-1947: Dolphin
- Owner: Royal Navy
- Acquired: 4 November 1920
- Out of service: 1947

General characteristics
- Class & type: Passenger ferry, later naval tender
- Tonnage: 100 GRT
- Displacement: 210 tons
- Length: 100.0 ft (30.5 m) p/p
- Beam: 19.0 ft (5.8 m)
- Depth: 7.1 ft (2.2 m)

HMS Aberfoyle was a tender of the Royal Navy. The vessel was built in 1912 in Dartmouth as The Aberfoyle (Note: One of the few merchant ships whose official name includes the definite article) for passenger service across Lough Swilly, Ireland by the Lough Swilly Steamboat Company. She was sold to the Admiralty for use as a tender in 1920, and was later deployed at HMS Dolphin, the submarine base at Gosport, taking that name. She was disposed of in 1947.

== The Aberfoyle ==
The ship was built by Philip & Son, Kingswear, Dartmouth Harbour, Devon, England, as Yard No.407 for the Lough Swilly Steamboat Company, based in Derry under the management of John McFarland, and initially named The Aberfoyle. She measured 100 GRT and 58 NRT and was 100.0 ft (30.5 m) in length between perpendiculars, 19.0 ft (5.8 m) in beam, 7.1 ft (2.2 m) in depth, and a draught of only 4.5 ft (1.4 m). The Aberfoyle had twin screws, powered by two compound steam engines made by the shipbuilder, totalling 34 nhp or 250 ihp and giving her a service speed of 9 knots (17 km/h); steam was supplied by a single fire-tube boiler operating at 130 psi.

The Aberfoyle arrived in Lough Swilly, County Donegal, via Derry, in October 1912 to enter passenger service between Fahan and Rathmullen. Her licensed capacity was 408 passengers. She was registered at the Port of Londonderry with British Official Number 121359.

In October 1920, enroute from Derry to the River Thames the shallow-draught vessel ran into a severe gale in the Irish Sea and, developing engine trouble, was forced to put in to Dublin for repairs.

== Naval service ==
The vessel was purchased by the Admiralty on 4 November 1920 and her name was shortened to Aberfoyle. At some point she was attached to submarine depot ship Cyclops.

In March 1938 the vessel was renamed Dolphin and transferred to be tender to the shore base of that name, the headquarters of the Royal Navy's submarine service, at Gosport in Portsmouth Harbour. The vessel was sold in 1947.
