= HMS Dolphin (1924) =

1902 merchant vessel turned depot ship

HMS Dolphin was originally the steam merchant ship Seti built in 1902 by Sir Raylton Dixon & Co Ltd. She was purchased by the Admiralty for the Royal Navy in November 1914, renamed Pandora, and used as a depot ship. She was renamed Dolphin in 1924 and was sunk by a mine laid by the German submarine U-22 in 1939, without loss of life. She was lost on her last trip while being towed to Cambois to be stripped of usable parts and scuttled as a blockship at Scapa Flow.
