= HMS Dolphin (1799) =

History

Dutch Republic
- Name: Dofijn
- Builder: Amsterdam
- Laid down: 3 November 1777
- Launched: 1780
- Captured: 1799

Great Britain
- Name: HMS Dolphin
- Acquired: 1799 by capture
- Commissioned: November 1799
- Fate: Broken up 1803

General characteristics
- Tons burthen: 505 (bm)
- Length: 125 voet 7 duim (Note: All linear measurements are in Amsterdam feet (voet) of 11 Amsterdam inches (duim) (see Dutch units of measurement). The Amsterdam foot is about 8% shorter than an English foot. The basis of measurement is also different.)
- Beam: 34 voet
- Depth of hold: 13 voet 2 duim
- Propulsion: Sails
- Complement: Dutch service:150-156; British service: n.a.
- Armament: Dutch service:20-24 guns; British service: n.a.
- Notes: van Maanen states that the British captured or burnt Delfin in 1779, i.e., before her completion date. The year 1779 appears to be a typographical error for 1799.

HMS Dolphin was the Dutch 7th Charter Dolfijn, launched in 1780 at Amsterdam. In 1781 she was under the command of Captain Mulder when she participated in the battle of Dogger Bank.

HMS Wolverine and HMS Arrow captured her on 15 September 1799 off Vlie Island. The Royal Navy took her into service and commissioned her in November as the sixth-rate HMS Dolphin under the command of Lieutenant R. M'Dougall. She became a transport in 1800, and a storeship in 1802. She was broken up in 1803.
