= Speedy-class brig =

1782 class of British brigs

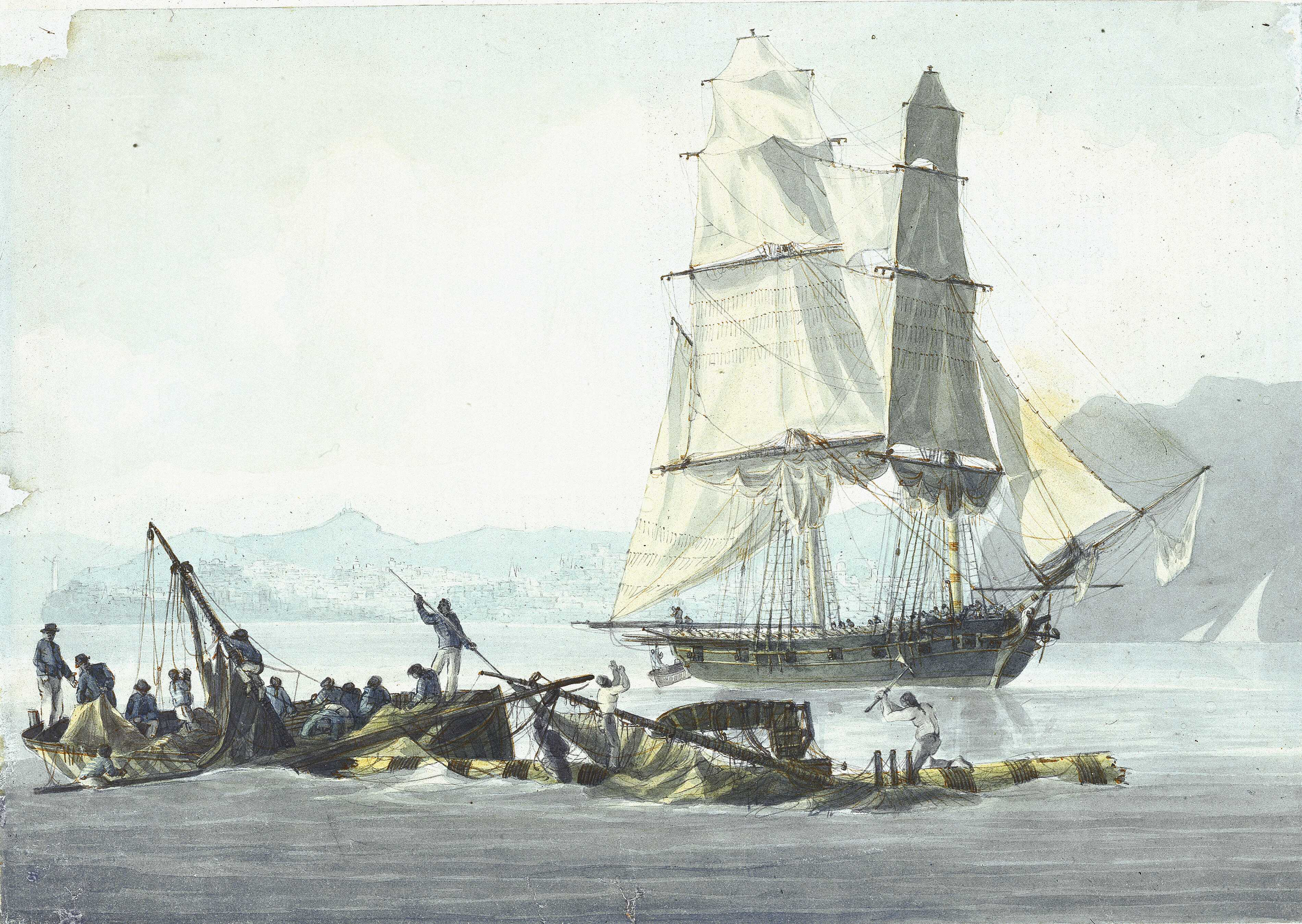
- HMS Speedy falling in with the wreck of Queen Charlotte, 21 March 1800

Class overview
- Name: Speedy
- Builders: Thomas King, Dover
- Operators: Royal Navy
- Completed: Two
- Lost: One
- Retired: One

General characteristics
- Type: 14-gun brig
- Tons burthen: 207 21/94 Tons bm
- Length: 78 ft 3 in (23.85 m) (overall); 59 ft 0 1/2 in (17.996 m) (keel)
- Beam: 25 ft 8.25 in (7.8296 m)
- Depth of hold: 10 ft 10 in (3.30 m)
- Propulsion: Sail
- Sail plan: brig
- Complement: 90
- Armament: 14 × 4-pounders; 12 × 1/2-pdr swivel guns

The Speedy-class brigs were a two-ship class of brig sloop built for the Royal Navy during the later years of the American War of Independence. They survived into the French Revolutionary Wars.

== Concept ==
The Speedy class was designed in 1781 by Dover shipwright Thomas King, a specialist builder of such craft. They were designed with a cutter-type hull, and anticipated the development of a new concept of the brig in naval warfare, that of brig sloops: small, fast escort vessels unlike the slower but more seaworthy ship-sloops. Their names were selected to epitomise this approach, HMS Speedy, and HMS Flirt. Small, light craft, they were 207 21/94 Tons bm, and measured 78 feet 3 inches (23.85 m) (overall) and 59 ft 0 1/2 in (17.996 m) (keel), with a beam of 25 feet 8.25 inches (7.8296 m) and 10 feet 10 inches (3.30 m) depth in the hold. Armed with fourteen 4-pounders, giving a broadside weight of 28 pounds, and twelve 1/2-pdr swivel guns, they had a crew of 70. This was broken up into 57 officers, seamen and marines; 12 servants and boys; and 1 widow's man.

== Careers ==
Both ships were completed too late to see any significant service in the American War of Independence, and spent most of the years of peace in British waters. Flirt sailed to the Caribbean in 1791, but was laid up in Deptford in November 1792, and did not return to service before being sold in 1795. Speedy was still in service on the outbreak of war with revolutionary France and was assigned to the Mediterranean, where she served under a number of distinguished commanders. She was captured in 1794, but had been retaken within a year. Her last captain, Lord Cochrane, achieved some of his greatest exploits with her, forcing the surrender of a much larger Spanish warship, the Gamo, but was forced to surrender her after being pursued by a large French squadron in 1801. She was donated to the Papal Navy by Napoleon and broken up a few years later.

== Ships ==
- HMS Speedy

Builder: Thomas King, Dover
Ordered: 23 March 1781
Laid down: June 1781
Launched: 19 June 1782
Completed: By 25 October 1782
Fate: Captured by the French on 3 July 1801; gifted to the Papal Navy in 1802

- HMS Flirt

Builder: Thomas King, Dover
Ordered: 23 March 1781
Laid down: August 1781
Launched: 4 March 1782
Completed: By 8 June 1782
Fate: Sold 1 December 1795. Purchased and became a whaler until a French privateer captured her in 1803.
