= Speedy Atkins =

Embalming subject (1875–1928)

Charles Henry "Speedy" Atkins
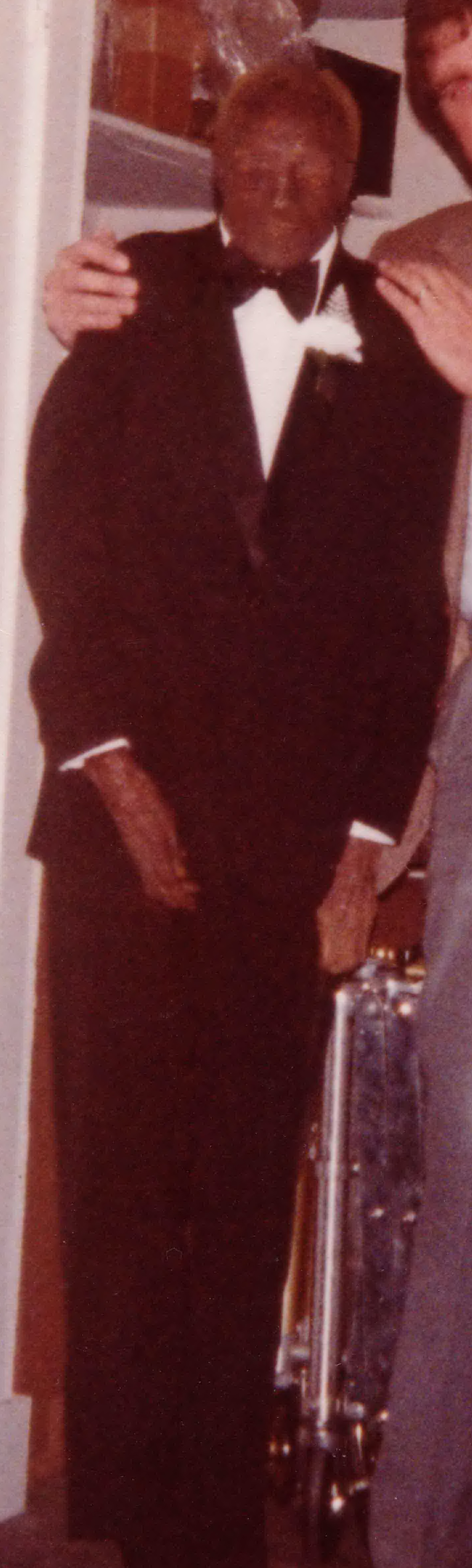
- Born: 1875; Tennessee
- Died: May 27, 1928 (aged 53); Paducah, Kentucky

Charles Henry "Speedy" Atkins (1875–1928) was an American tobacco worker in Paducah, Kentucky. A pauper at his death, he drowned in the Ohio River. The city turned over his body for a pauper's burial to his friend A.Z. Hamock, the only African-American undertaker in town. Hamock preserved Atkins' body in an experiment with preservatives, and occasionally displayed it after his death. Hamock's wife had custody of the remains for 45 years, during which Atkins' mummy acquired increasing notoriety. His body was finally buried in 1994, 66 years after he drowned. The event was covered by national media and TV.

== Biography ==
Charles Atkins was born in Tennessee and, as an adult, moved to Kentucky to find work. Not much is known about his life. He settled in downtown Paducah as an hourly employee at a plant with ties to the tobacco industry. He gained the nickname "Speedy" at work because of his speed with handling tobacco. Single and without known relatives, he befriended A. Z. Hamock, an African American who owned the city's only funeral home for blacks in the segregated city.

In May 1928, Atkins went fishing and fell with his line into the Ohio River, where he drowned. The city transferred his body to Hamock's Funeral Home for a pauper's burial.

== A. Z. Hamock ==
Having created a powerful preservative, Hamock decided to experiment with it to preserve Atkins' body. The mixture transformed the corpse into a wooden-like statue. While Atkins' black skin was altered to a reddish color, his facial features remained recognizable.

Hamock put the preserved body of Atkins on occasional display at the funeral home; he mostly stored it in a closet. He did not charge a fee for viewers. Washed away by waters of the Ohio River during the Paducah flood of 1937, Speedy's body was recognized and returned to Hamock at his funeral home.

After Hamock died in 1949, his wife Velma took over custody of Atkins' body.

== Velma Gaines-Hamock ==
Velma Louise Gaines Hamock (May 25, 1910 – October 3, 2000) was an American funeral home owner in Paducah, Kentucky. In 1949 she inherited the business, at one time the only African-American owned funeral home in the city, after the death of her husband A. Z. Hamock. She kept the mummy of Atkins for more than 40 more years before burial in 1994. As had her husband, Velma Hamock kept Atkins' preserved body in a closet when it was not displayed to tourists.

Velman kept Atkins' body for another 45 years before burial. During the 66 years that Atkins' body was preserved, awareness of the mummified corpse became more widespread.

Mrs. Hamock planned to bury the mummy in 1991 on her late husband's 100th birthday, but waited until May 1994.

She died in October 2000.

== 1994 funeral ==
About 200 people attended Atkins' 1994 funeral and burial in Maplelawn Cemetery in Paducah.

== Representation in other media ==
Because of his body's unique condition, "Speedy" Atkins' mummy was featured in national media as well as Ripley's Believe It or Not, the TV program That's Incredible, and the National Enquirer. His story was also told on the Discovery Channel.
