= Flirt (disambiguation) =

Flirting is a playful, romantic or sexual overture by one person to another.

Flirt, Flirting or Flirtation may also refer to:

== Film ==
- Flirt (1983 film), an Italian-French drama by Roberto Russo
- Flirt (1995 film), an American film by Hal Hartley
- The Flirt (1917 film), an American comedy short starring Harold Lloyd
- The Flirt (1922 film), an American silent comedy film by Hobart Henley
- Flirtation (1927 film), a German silent drama film by Jacob Fleck and Luise Fleck
- Flirtation (1934 film), an American drama film by Leo Birinsky
- Flirting (film), a 1991 Australian coming-of-age film by John Duigan

== Music ==
- The Flirts, an American dance music group
- Flirt (album), an album by Evelyn King
- Flirt, an unreleased album by Eve
- "Flirt", a 2005 song by the Pussycat Dolls from PCD
- "Flirt", a 2022 song by Ale Zabala, representing Florida in the American Song Contest
- "Flirting", a song by Madi Diaz from Fatal Optimist

== Transport ==
- HMS Flirt, six ships of the British Royal Navy
- Jeanneau Flirt, a French sailboat design
- Sky Flirt, a Czech paraglider produced by Sky Paragliders
- Stadler FLIRT (Fast Light Intercity Regional Train), an electric commuter train

== Other uses ==
- FLiRT, a family of variants of SARS-CoV-2
- Flirt (chimpanzee), a chimpanzee of the Kasakela chimpanzee community
- Flirt (novel), a 2010 book in the Anita Blake: Vampire Hunter series
- Flirt FM, a radio station in Ireland
- Flirt!, a branded college mixer at some British universities
- Flirtation (novel), an 1827 novel by Lady Charlotte Bury

== See also ==
- Flirtation Peak, a mountain in Colorado
- The Flirtations (disambiguation)
