= 1882 =

1882 in various calendars
- Gregorian calendar: 1882; MDCCCLXXXII
- Ab urbe condita: 2635
- Armenian calendar: 1331; ԹՎ ՌՅԼԱ
- Assyrian calendar: 6632
- Baháʼí calendar: 38–39
- Balinese saka calendar: 1803–1804
- Bengali calendar: 1288–1289
- Berber calendar: 2832
- British Regnal year: 45 Vict. 1 – 46 Vict. 1
- Buddhist calendar: 2426
- Burmese calendar: 1244
- Byzantine calendar: 7390–7391
- Chinese calendar: 辛巳年 (Metal Snake); 4579 or 4372 — to — 壬午年 (Water Horse); 4580 or 4373
- Coptic calendar: 1598–1599
- Discordian calendar: 3048
- Ethiopian calendar: 1874–1875
- Hebrew calendar: 5642–5643
- Hindu calendars
- Vikram Samvat: 1938–1939
- Shaka Samvat: 1803–1804
- Kali Yuga: 4982–4983
- Holocene calendar: 11882
- Igbo calendar: 882–883
- Iranian calendar: 1260–1261
- Islamic calendar: 1299–1300
- Japanese calendar: Meiji 15 (明治１５年)
- Javanese calendar: 1811–1812
- Julian calendar: Gregorian minus 12 days
- Korean calendar: 4215
- Minguo calendar: 30 before ROC 民前30年
- Nanakshahi calendar: 414
- Thai solar calendar: 2424–2425
- Tibetan calendar: ལྕགས་མོ་སྦྲུལ་ལོ་ (female Iron-Snake); 2008 or 1627 or 855 — to — ཆུ་ཕོ་རྟ་ལོ་ (male Water-Horse); 2009 or 1628 or 856

1882 (MDCCCLXXXII) was a common year starting on Sunday of the Gregorian calendar and a common year starting on Friday of the Julian calendar, the 1882nd year of the Common Era (CE) and Anno Domini (AD) designations, the 882nd year of the 2nd millennium, the 82nd year of the 19th century, and the 3rd year of the 1880s decade. As of the start of 1882, the Gregorian calendar was 12 days ahead of the Julian calendar, which remained in localized use until 1923.

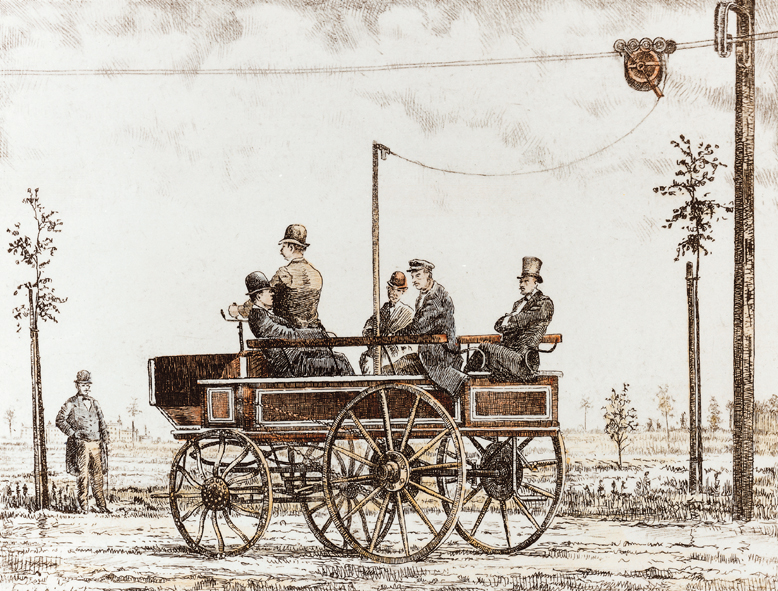
The "Elektromote", the world's first trolleybus, in Berlin, Germany, 1882

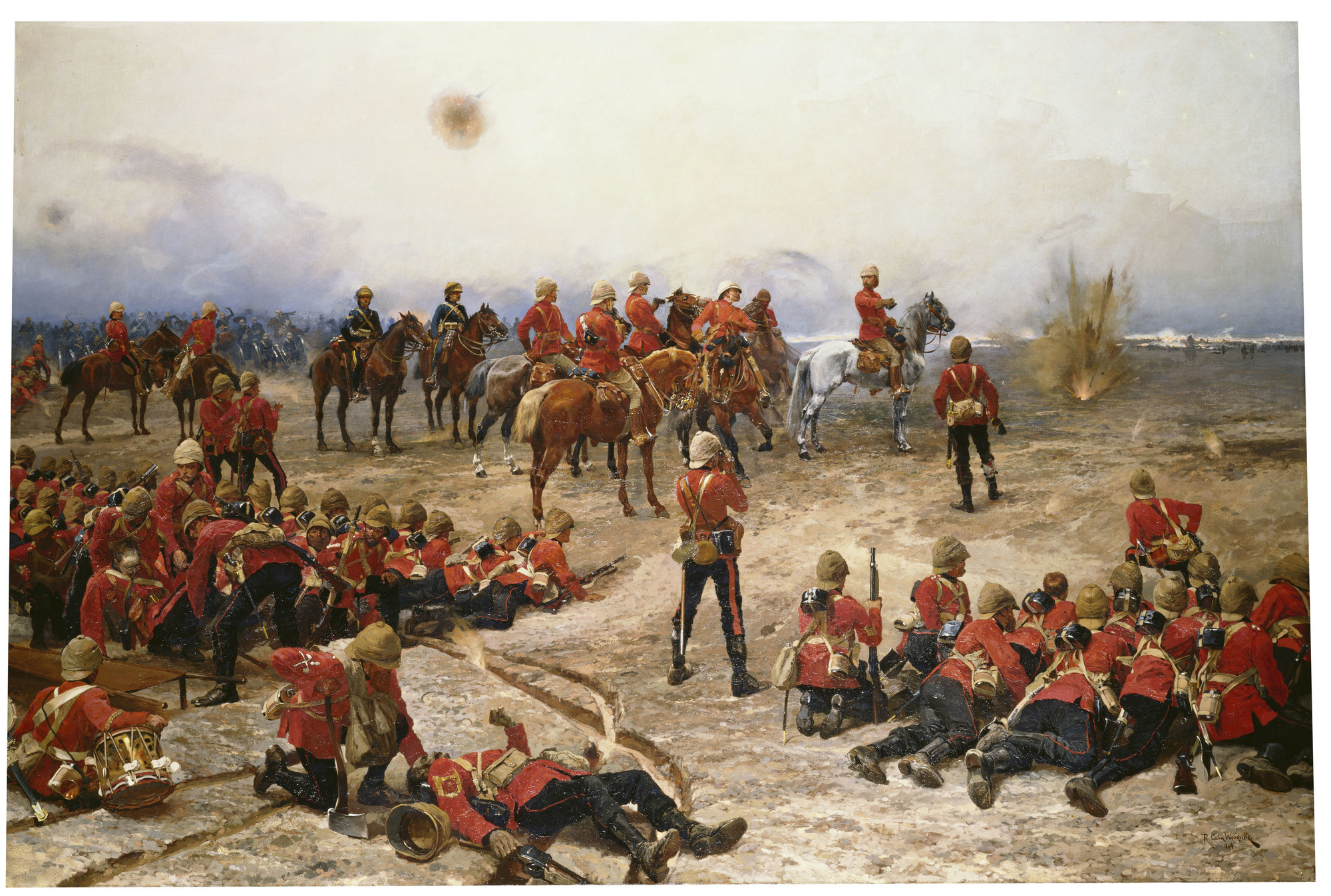
September 13: Battle of Tell El Kebir.

== Events ==
=== January ===
- January 2
  - The Standard Oil Trust is secretly created in the United States to control multiple corporations set up by John D. Rockefeller and his associates.
  - Irish-born author Oscar Wilde arrives in New York at the beginning of a lecture tour of the United States and Canada.
- January 12 – Holborn Viaduct power station in the City of London, the world's first coal-fired public electricity generating station, begins operation.

=== February ===
- February 3 – American showman P. T. Barnum acquires the elephant Jumbo from the London Zoo.
- February 4 – Charles J. Guiteau, the murderer of President James A. Garfield, is sentenced to death (found guilty on January 25), despite an insanity defense raised by his lawyer.

=== March ===
- March 2 – Roderick Maclean fails in an attempt to assassinate Queen Victoria, at Windsor.
- March 6 (February 22 Old Style) – The Principality of Serbia becomes the Kingdom of Serbia following a proclamation.
- March 20 – British gunboats enter Monrovia, with Arthur Havelock demanding that Liberia cede disputed territory to the British colony of Sierra Leone, of which he is Governor.
- March 22 – Polygamy is made a felony by the Edmunds Act, passed by the United States Congress.
- March 24 – Robert Koch announces the discovery of the bacterium responsible for tuberculosis (Mycobacterium tuberculosis).
- March 28
  - Republican Jules Ferry makes primary education in France free, non-clerical (laique) and obligatory.
  - German medical products company Beiersdorf is founded.
- March 29 – The Knights of Columbus, a Catholic fraternal service organization, is founded in New Haven, Connecticut.

=== April ===
- April 3 – Old West outlaw Jesse James is shot in the back of the head and killed by Robert Ford in St. Joseph, Missouri.
- April 29 – The Elektromote, the world's first trolleybus, begins operation in Berlin.

=== May ===
- May 1
  - The Berlin Philharmonic orchestra is founded in Germany, as Frühere Bilsesche Kapelle.
  - Édouard Manet exhibits his painting A Bar at the Folies-Bergère at the Paris Salon.
- May 2 – The Kilmainham Treaty, an agreement between the British government and Irish nationalist leader Charles Stewart Parnell to abate tenant rent arrears, is announced; Parnell is released from Kilmainham Gaol in Dublin.
- May 6
  - Phoenix Park Murders in Ireland: Lord Frederick Cavendish, the newly appointed Chief Secretary for Ireland, and Thomas Henry Burke, his Permanent Undersecretary, are fatally stabbed in Phoenix Park, Dublin, by members of the Irish National Invincibles (militant Irish republicans).
  - The Chinese Exclusion Act, prohibiting the immigration of Chinese laborers, is the first law which restricts immigration into the United States.
- May 18 – Burnley F.C. in Northern England changes codes, from rugby football to association football.
- May 20 – The Triple Alliance is formed between Germany, Austria-Hungary and Italy.

=== June ===
- June 6
  - Supposedly, the Bombay Cyclone of 1882 in the Arabian Sea causes flooding in Bombay harbor, leaving about 100,000 dead; this alleged event has, however, been proved a hoax.
  - Battle of Embabo: The Shewan forces of Menelik II defeat the Gojjame army.
- June 11 – The 'Urabi revolt breaks out in Egypt against Khedive Tewfik Pasha and European influence in that country.
- June 28 – The Anglo-French Convention of 1882 is signed, marking territorial boundaries between Guinea and Sierra Leone.
- June 30 – U.S. presidential assassin Charles J. Guiteau is hanged in Washington, D.C.
- June
  - Ferdinand von Lindemann publishes his proof of the transcendentality of pi.
  - St Andrew's Ambulance Association is founded in Glasgow, Scotland; St. John Ambulance Canada is also founded this year.

=== July ===
- July 11–13 – Anglo-Egyptian War: The British Mediterranean Fleet carries out the Bombardment of Alexandria, its forces capturing the city of Alexandria, Egypt, and securing the Suez Canal.
- July 23 – The Imo Incident occurs in Seoul, Korea, as a result of bad rations and late payment for soldiers of the Joseon Army.
- July 26
  - Boers establish the republic of Stellaland in southern Africa.
  - Richard Wagner's opera Parsifal debuts, at the Bayreuth Festspielhaus in Bavaria.
- July 31 – The Hebrew Moshava of Rishon LeZion in Palestine is founded.

=== August ===
- August 3 – The United States Congress passes the Immigration Act of 1882, imposing a head tax on immigrants to the U.S. and excluding undesirables.
- August 5 – Standard Oil of New Jersey, the company later known as ExxonMobil, is established.
- August 18 – The Married Women's Property Act 1882 receives royal assent in Britain; it enables women to buy, own and sell property, and to keep their own earnings.
- August 20 – Pyotr Ilyich Tchaikovsky's 1812 Overture debuts in Moscow.
- August 29 – The Australian cricket team historically defeats England at The Oval for the first time on English soil, a humiliation for the English and the origin for The Ashes test series.

=== September ===
- September 4 – Thomas Edison flips the switch to the first commercial electrical power plant in the United States, lighting one square mile of lower Manhattan. This is considered by many as the day that begins the electrical age.
- September 5
  - The first United States Labor Day parade is held in New York City.
  - Tottenham Hotspur F.C. is founded (as Hotspur F.C.) in London.
- September 13
  - Anglo-Egyptian War: British troops occupy Cairo, and Egypt becomes a British protectorate.
  - Selwyn College, Cambridge, is founded after Queen Victoria grants a Charter of Incorporation.

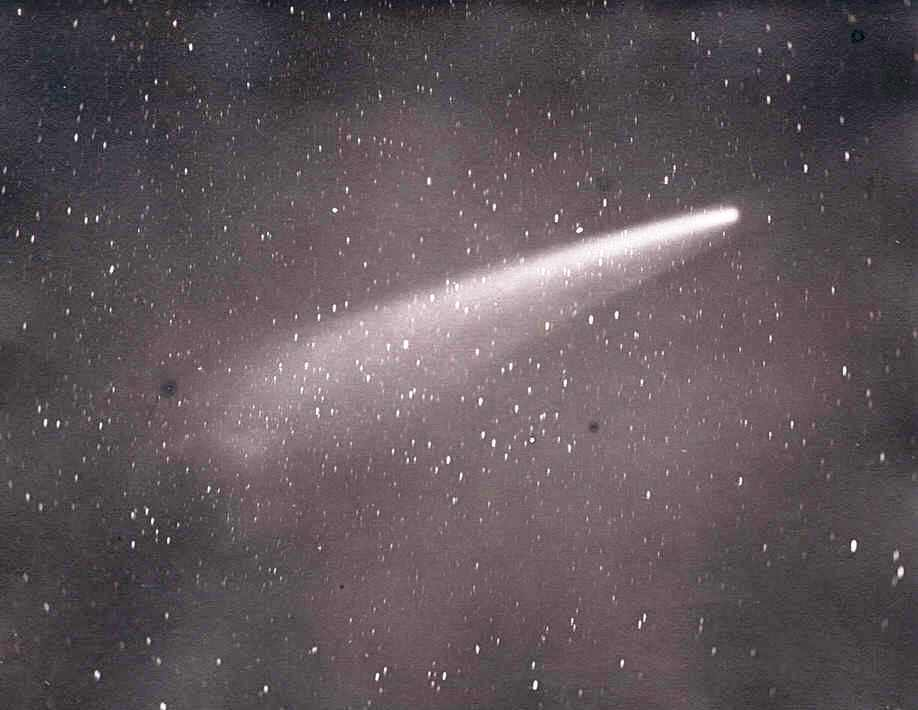
Photograph of the comet as seen from Cape Town by David Gill.

- September 18 – Great Comet of 1882: Her Majesty's Astronomer at the Cape, David Gill, reports watching the comet rise a few minutes before the Sun, describing it as "The nucleus was then undoubtedly single, and certainly rather under than over 4″ in diameter; in fact, as I have described it, it resembled very much a star of the 1st magnitude seen by daylight."

=== October ===
- October 5 – The Society for Ethical Culture of Chicago (the modern-day Ethical Humanist Society of Chicago) is founded by Felix Adler.
- October 10 – The Bank of Japan opens in Tokyo City.
- October 14 – The University of the Punjab at Lahore (British India), is founded in modern-day Pakistan.
- October 16 – The New York, Chicago and St. Louis Railroad ("Nickel Plate Road") runs its first trains over the entire system between Buffalo, New York, and Chicago. Nine days later the Seney Syndicate sells the road to William Henry Vanderbilt, for US$7.2 million.
- October 21 – Waseda University is founded by Shigenobu Ōkuma in Japan as Tokyo Specializing School.

=== November ===
- November 2 – The Great Fire of Oulu destroys 27 buildings in the downtown of Oulu, Finland.
- November 14 – Franklyn Leslie shoots Billy Claiborne dead in the streets of Tombstone, Arizona.
- November 16 – The British Royal Navy's HMS Flirt destroys Abari village in Niger.

=== December ===
- December 6 – A transit of Venus, the last until 2004, occurs.
- December – Zikhron Ya'akov is founded in northern Israel.

=== Date unknown ===
- The first International Polar Year, an international scientific program, begins.
- Zulu king Cetshwayo kaMpande returns to South Africa from England.
- A peace treaty is signed between Paraguay and Uruguay.
- Pogroms in Southern Russia end.
- Nikola Tesla claims this is when he conceives the rotating magnetic field principle, which he later uses to invent his induction motor.
- The British Chartered Institute of Patent Agents (the modern-day Chartered Institute of Patent Attorneys) is founded.
- Redruth Mining School opens in Cornwall.
- The Personal Liberty League is established to oppose the temperance movement in the United States.
- Carolyn Merrick is elected president of the Woman's Christian Temperance Union in the United States.
- Founding of the following sports clubs:
  - Albion Rovers F.C. (through the amalgamation of two Coatbridge clubs, Albion and Rovers) in the urban west of Scotland;
  - Christchurch Rangers, the earliest predecessor of Queens Park Rangers F.C., in London;
  - Glentoran F.C. in Belfast in the north of Ireland;
  - Thames Ditton Lawn Tennis Club, the oldest lawn tennis club still on its original site, in the outer London suburbs;
  - Waterloo F.C., a rugby union club, as Serpentine on Merseyside in the north of England.

== Births ==
=== January ===
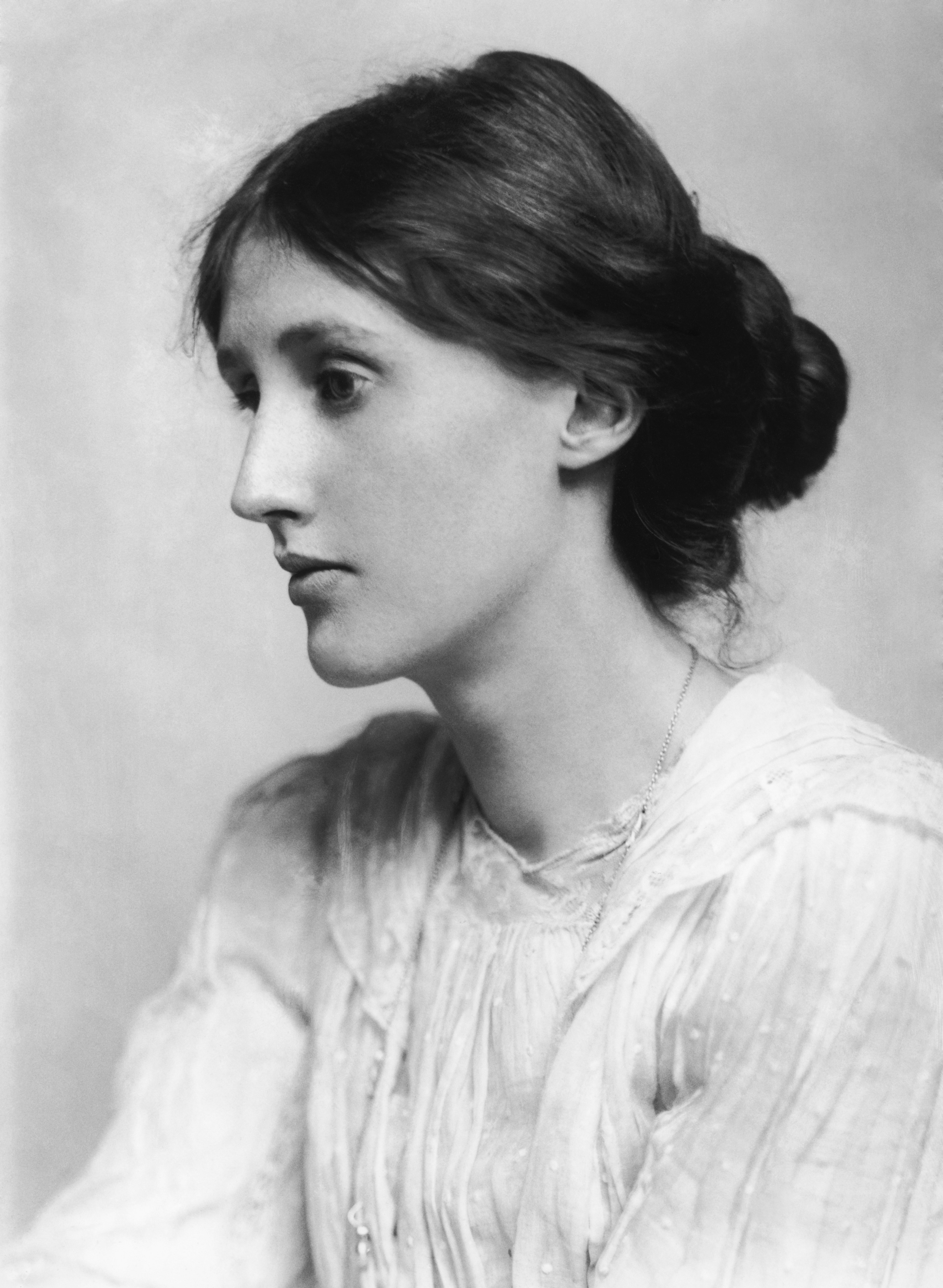
Virginia Woolf

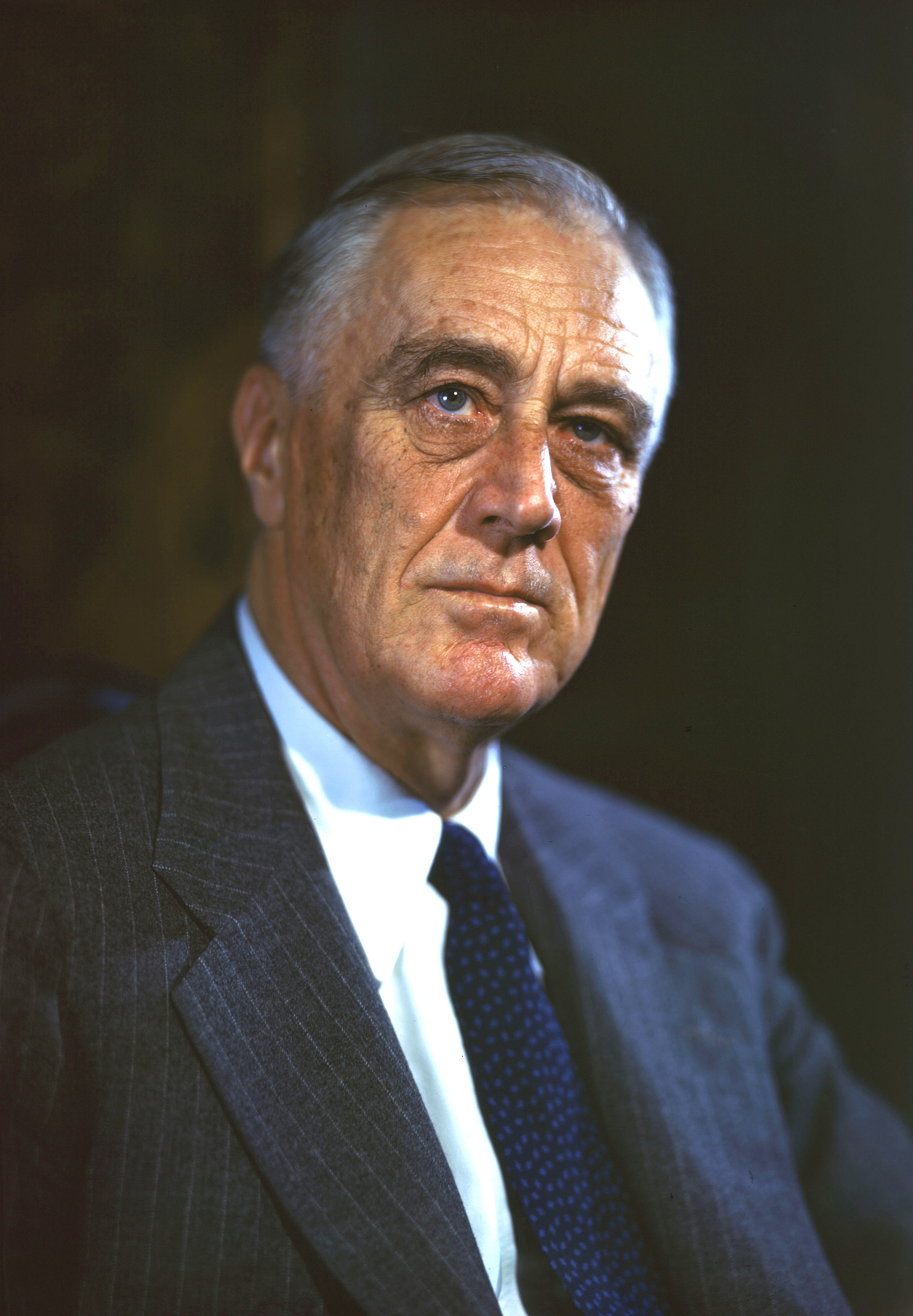
Franklin D. Roosevelt

- January 5 – Edwin Barclay, 18th president of Liberia (d. 1955)
- January 6
  - Fan Noli, Albanian poet, political figure (d. 1965)
  - Ferdinand Pecora, Sicilian-born American lawyer (d. 1971)
  - Sam Rayburn, Speaker of the United States House of Representatives (d. 1961)
- January 9 – Otto Ruge, Norwegian general (d. 1961)
- January 12 – Milton Sills, American actor (d. 1930)
- January 17
  - Arnold Rothstein, American gangster (d. 1928)
  - Noah Beery, American actor (d. 1946)
- January 18 – A. A. Milne, British author (d. 1956)
- January 20 – Johnny Torrio, Italian-born American gangster (d. 1957)
- January 22 – Theodore Kosloff, Russian-born actor (d. 1956)
- January 23 – Anna Abrikosova, Soviet Roman Catholic religious sister and servant of God (d. 1936)
- January 25 – Virginia Woolf, English writer (d. 1941)
- January 28
  - Mary Boland, American actress (d. 1965)
  - Gengo Hyakutake, Japanese admiral (d. 1976)
  - Pascual Orozco, Mexican revolutionary (d. 1915)
- January 30 – Franklin D. Roosevelt, 32nd President of the United States (d. 1945)
- January 31 – Fritz Leiber, American stage, screen actor (d. 1949)

=== February ===
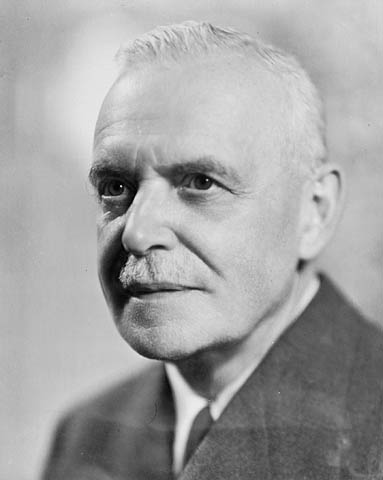
Louis St. Laurent

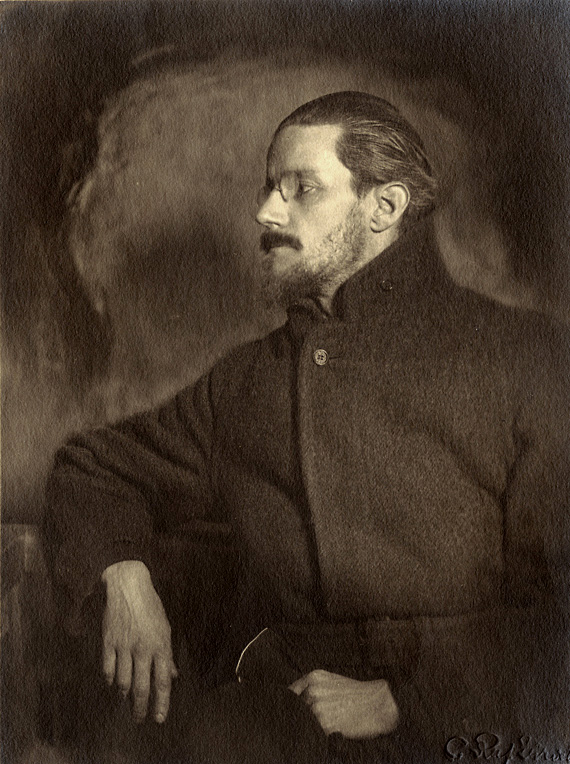
James Joyce

- February 1
  - Vladimir Dimitrov, Bulgarian artist (d. 1960)
  - Louis St. Laurent, 12th Prime Minister of Canada (d. 1973)
- February 2
  - Anne Bauchens, American film editor (d. 1967)
  - James Joyce, Irish author (d. 1941)
- February 4 – E. J. Pratt, Canadian poet (d. 1964)
- February 5 – Louis Wagner, French Grand Prix racer, aviator (d. 1960)
- February 11
  - Valli Valli, German-born British actress (d. 1927)
  - Joe Jordan, American ragtime composer (d. 1971)
- February 12 – Walter Nash, 27th Prime Minister of New Zealand (d. 1968)
- February 15 – John Barrymore, American actor (d. 1942)
- February 18 – Petre Dumitrescu, Romanian general (d. 1950)
- February 20 – Alexander Carrick, Scottish sculptor (d. 1966)
- February 22 – Eric Gill, English sculptor, writer (d. 1940)
- February 24 – Bosman di Ravelli, South African concert pianist, composer, and writer (d. 1967)
- February 26 – Husband E. Kimmel, American admiral (d. 1968)
- February 28
  - Geraldine Farrar, American soprano (d. 1967)
  - Herbert Silberer, Austrian psychoanalyst (d. 1923)

=== March ===
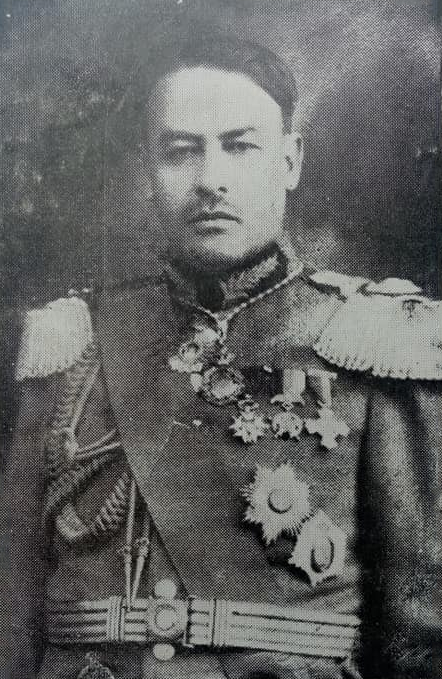
Carlos Blanco Galindo

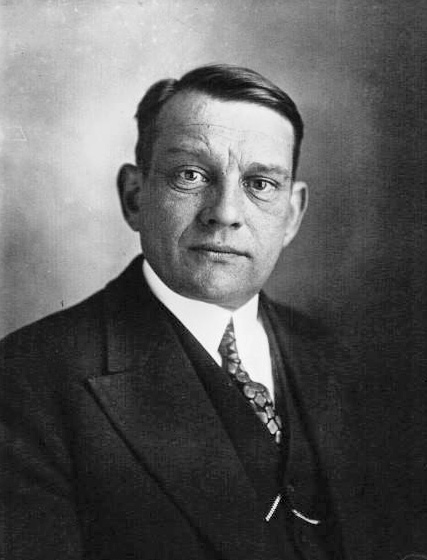
René Coty

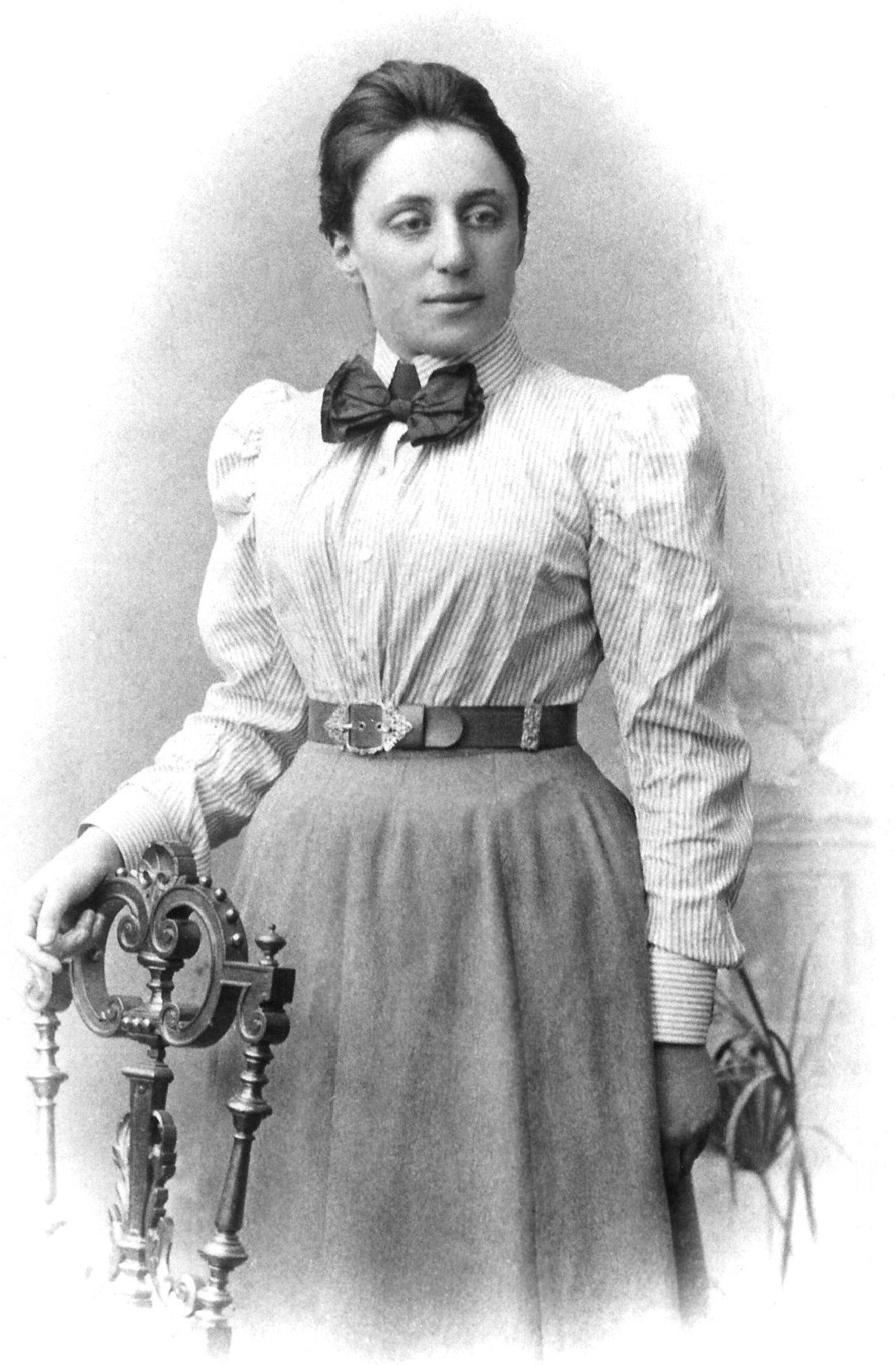
Emmy Noether

- March 3 – Charles Ponzi, Italian-born American con man (d. 1949)
- March 6 – F. Burrall Hoffman, American architect (d. 1980)
- March 8 – Alfred A. Cunningham, first United States Marine Corps aviator (d. 1939)
- March 12 – Carlos Blanco Galindo, 32nd President of Bolivia (d. 1943)
- March 14
  - Wacław Sierpiński, Polish mathematician (d. 1969)
  - Giuseppe Tellera, Italian general (d. 1941)
- March 15 – Jim Lightbody, American middle-distance runner (d. 1953)
- March 18 – Gian Francesco Malipiero, Italian composer (d. 1973)
- March 20 – René Coty, 17th President of France (d. 1962)
- March 22 – John W. Wilcox Jr., American admiral (d. 1942)
- March 23 – Emmy Noether, German mathematician (d. 1935)
- March 24 – George Monckton-Arundell, 8th Viscount Galway, English politician, 5th Governor-General of New Zealand (d. 1943)
- March 30
  - Melanie Klein, Austrian-born British child psychoanalyst (d. 1960)
  - Vittorio Tur, Italian admiral (d. 1969)

=== April ===
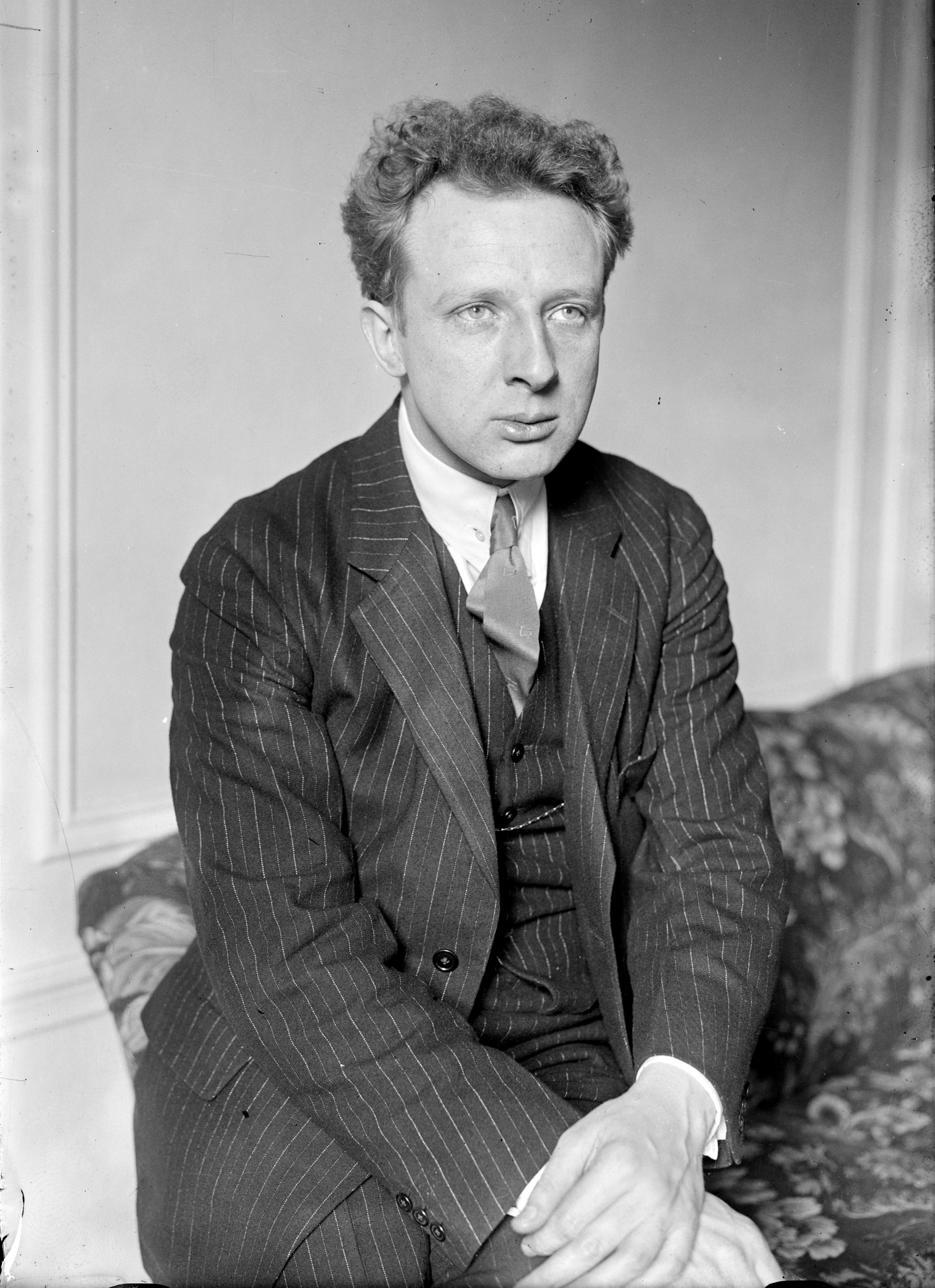
Leopold Stokowski

- April 7 – Kurt von Schleicher, Chancellor of Germany (d. 1934)
- April 17 – Artur Schnabel, Polish pianist (d. 1951)
- April 18
  - Monteiro Lobato, Brazilian writer (d. 1948)
  - Leopold Stokowski, English conductor (d. 1977)
- April 19 – Getúlio Vargas, 14th and 17th president of Brazil (d. 1954)
- April 20
  - Nicolae Ciupercă, Romanian general and politician (d. 1950)
  - Holland Smith, American general (d. 1967)
- April 21 – Percy Williams Bridgman, American physicist, Nobel Prize laureate (d. 1961)
- April 24 – Hugh Dowding, commander of the RAF Fighter Command during the Battle of Britain (d. 1970)
- April 29 – Hendrik Nicolaas Werkman, Dutch artist, printer (d. 1945)

=== May ===
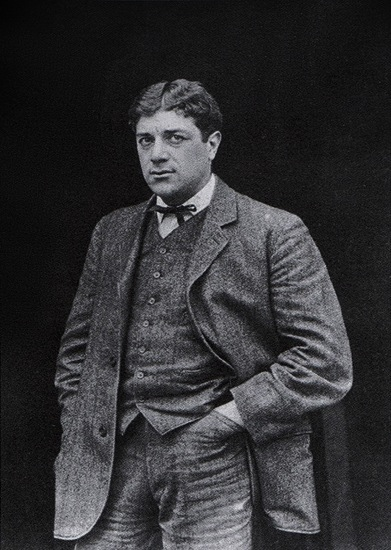
Georges Braque

- May 2 – James F. Byrnes, American politician, Secretary of State and Associate Justice of the Supreme Court of the United States (d. 1972)
- May 5
  - Sylvia Pankhurst, English suffragette (d. 1960)
  - Sir Douglas Mawson, Australian Antarctic explorer (d. 1958)
- May 6 – Crown Prince Wilhelm of Germany, heir-apparent of Emperor Wilhelm II (d. 1951)
- May 9 – Henry J. Kaiser, American industrialist (d. 1967)
- May 10 – Thurston Hall, American stage & screen actor (d. 1958)
- May 13 – Georges Braque, French painter (d. 1963)
- May 16 – Mary Gordon, Scottish stage and screen actress (d. 1963)
- May 20
  - Sigrid Undset, Norwegian author, Nobel Prize laureate (d. 1949)
  - Fannie Salter, American lighthouse keeper (d. 1966)
- May 25 – Marie Doro, American stage, silent film actress (d. 1956)
- May 26 – Jess McMahon, American professional boxing, wrestling promoter (d. 1954)
- May 28 – Avery Hopwood, American playwright (d. 1928)
- May 30 – Wyndham Halswelle, British runner (d. 1915)

=== June ===
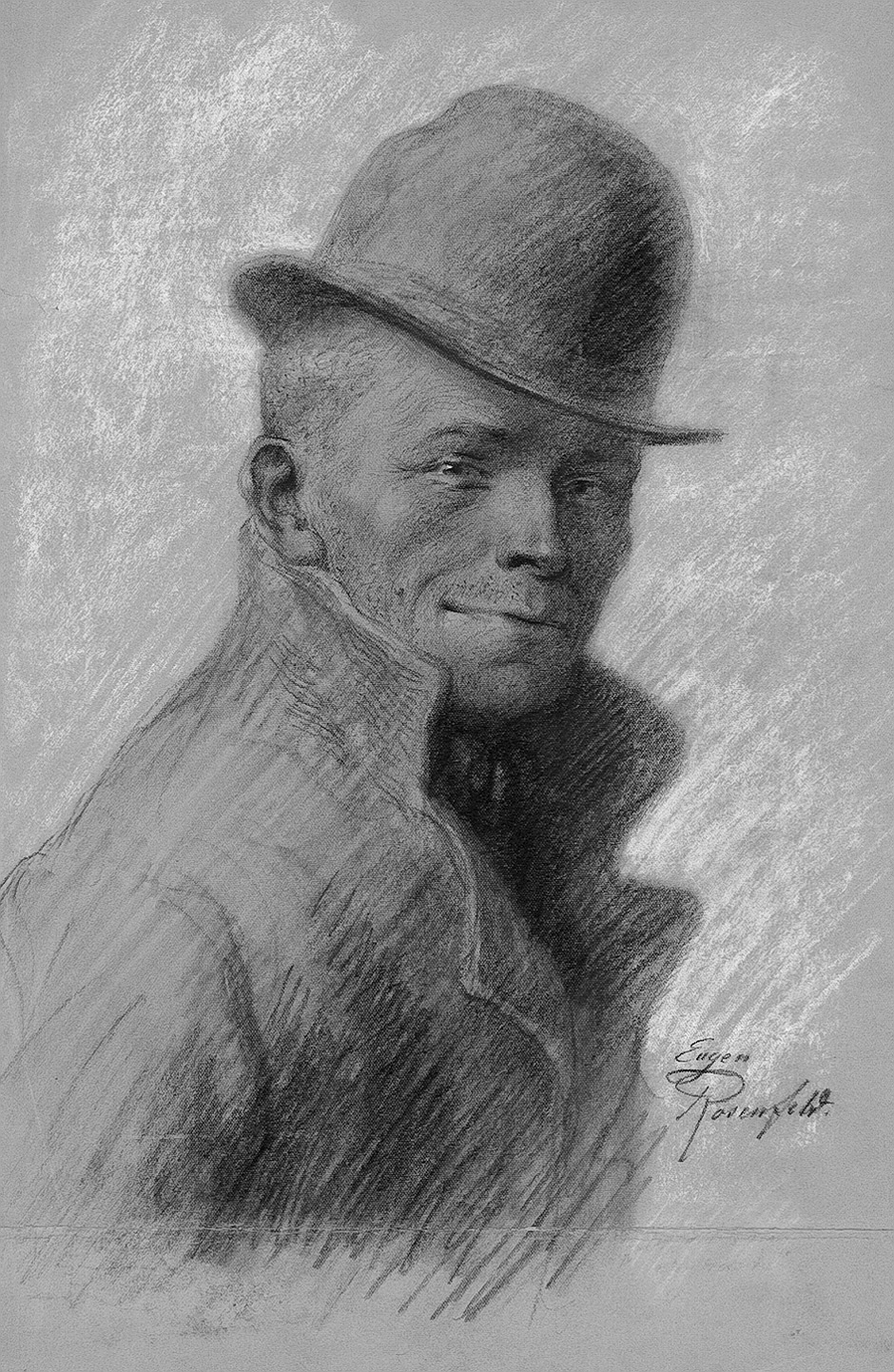
Karl Valentin

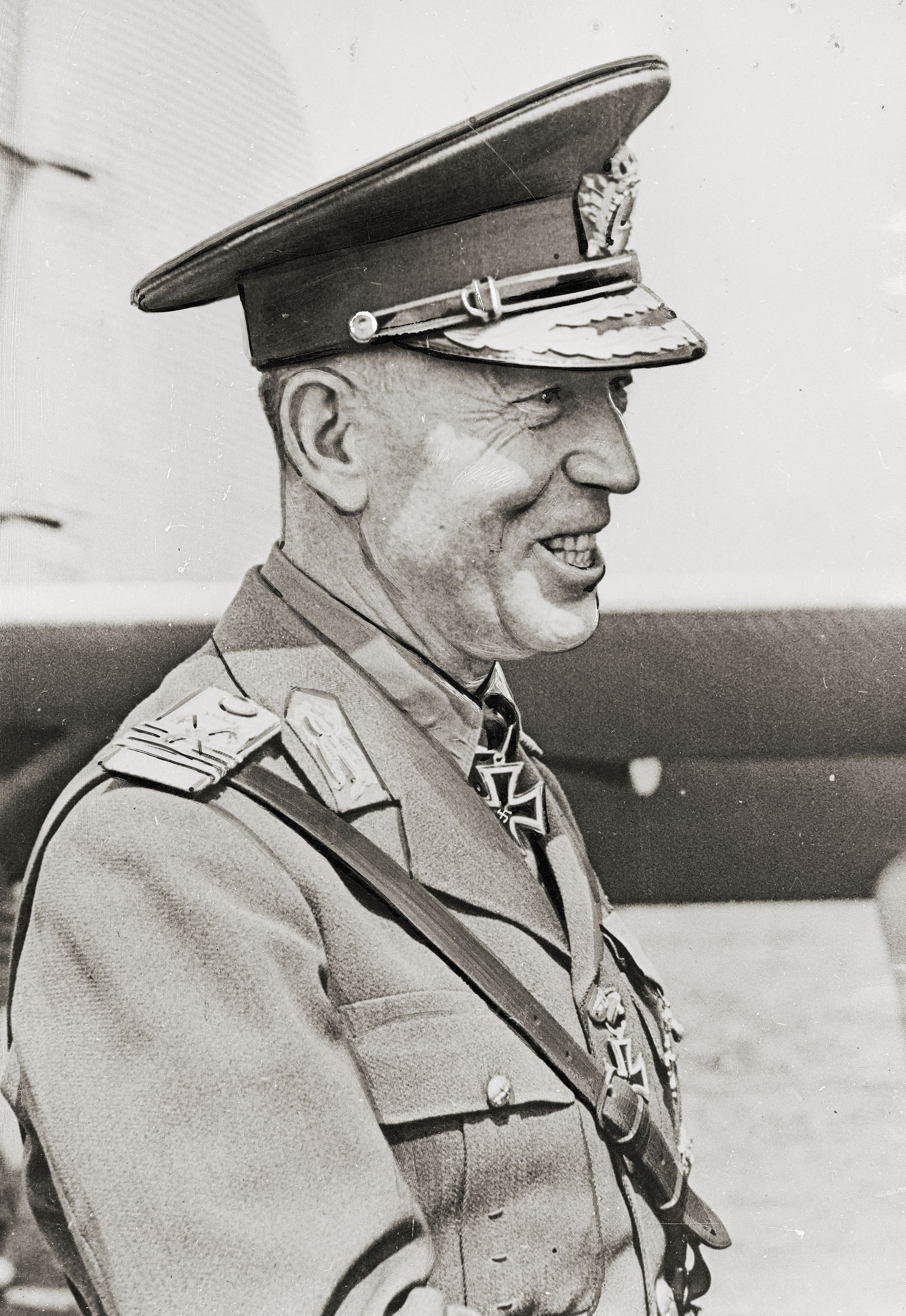
Ion Antonescu

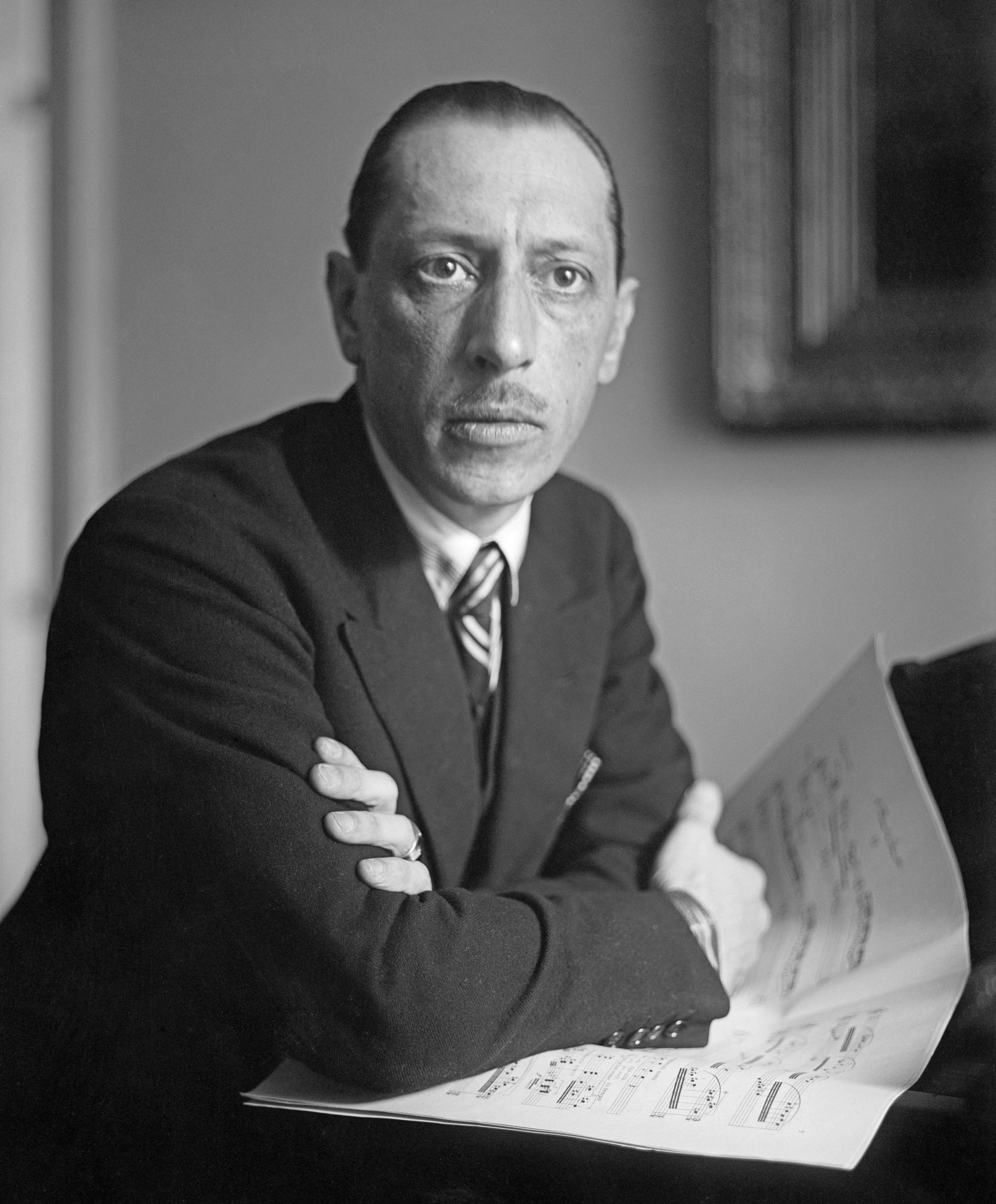
Igor Stravinsky

- June 4 – Karl Valentin, German actor (d. 1948)
- June 9 – Robert Kerr, Canadian sprinter (d. 1963)
- June 10 – Nevile Henderson, British diplomat (d. 1942)
- June 12 – Roi Cooper Megrue, American playwright (d. 1927)
- June 15 – Ion Antonescu, Romanian prime minister, dictator (d. 1946)
- June 16 – Mohammad Mosaddegh, Iranian politician, 35th Prime Minister of Iran (d. 1967)
- June 17
  - Adolphus Frederick VI, Grand Duke of Mecklenburg-Strelitz (d. 1918)
  - Igor Stravinsky, Russian composer (d. 1971)
- June 18 – Georgi Dimitrov, 32nd Prime Minister of Bulgaria (d. 1949)
- June 21 – Lluís Companys, President of Catalonia (d. 1940)
- June 28 – Valeska Suratt, American stage actress, silent film star (d. 1962)
- June 29 – Ole Singstad, Norwegian-American civil engineer (d. 1969)

=== July ===
- July 1 – Bidhan Chandra Roy, Indian physician and politician, Chief Minister of West Bengal (d. 1962)
- July 8 – Percy Grainger, Australian composer (d. 1961)
- July 10 – Ima Hogg, American society leader, philanthropist, patron and collector of the arts (d. 1975)
- July 17 – James Somerville, British admiral (d. 1949)
- July 22 – Edward Hopper, American painter (d. 1967)
- July 25 – George S. Rentz, United States Navy Chaplain, Navy Cross winner (d. 1942)
- July 27
  - Donald Crisp, English actor, film director, screenwriter, and producer (d. 1974)
  - Geoffrey de Havilland, British aviation pioneer, aircraft company founder (d. 1965)
- July 31
  - Itamar Ben-Avi, first native speaker of Modern Hebrew (d. 1943)

=== August ===
- August 11 – Rodolfo Graziani, Italian general (d. 1955)
- August 14 – Gisela Richter, English art historian (d. 1972)
- August 16 – Christian Mortensen, Danish supercentenarian, oldest verified male ever at the time of his death (d. 1998)
- August 19 – MacGillivray Milne, United States Navy Captain, 27th Governor of American Samoa (d. 1959)
- August 22 – Raymonde de Laroche, French aviator, first woman to receive an aviator's license (d. 1919)
- August 25 – Seán T. O'Kelly, second President of Ireland (d. 1966)
- August 26 – James Franck, German-born physicist, Nobel Prize laureate (d. 1964)

=== September ===
- September 1 – Nicholas H. Heck, American geophysicist, oceanographer, and surveyor (d. 1953)
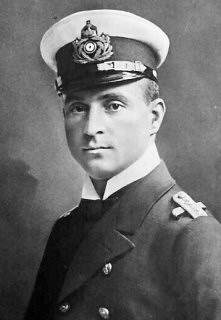
  Otto Weddigen
- September 8 – Sada Cowan, American playwright and screenwriter (d. 1943)
- September 10 – Károly Huszár, 25th Prime Minister of Hungary (d. 1941)
- September 11 – William T. Bovie, American biophysicist, inventor (d. 1958)
- September 12 – Ion Agârbiceanu, Romanian writer, journalist, politician and priest (d. 1963)
- September 13 – Ramón Grau, Cuban president (d. 1969)
- September 15 - Otto Weddigen, German U-boat commander during World War I (killed in action) (d. 1915)
- September 16 – Robert Hichens, RMS Titanic quartermaster, man at the wheel when Titanic hit the iceberg (d. 1940)
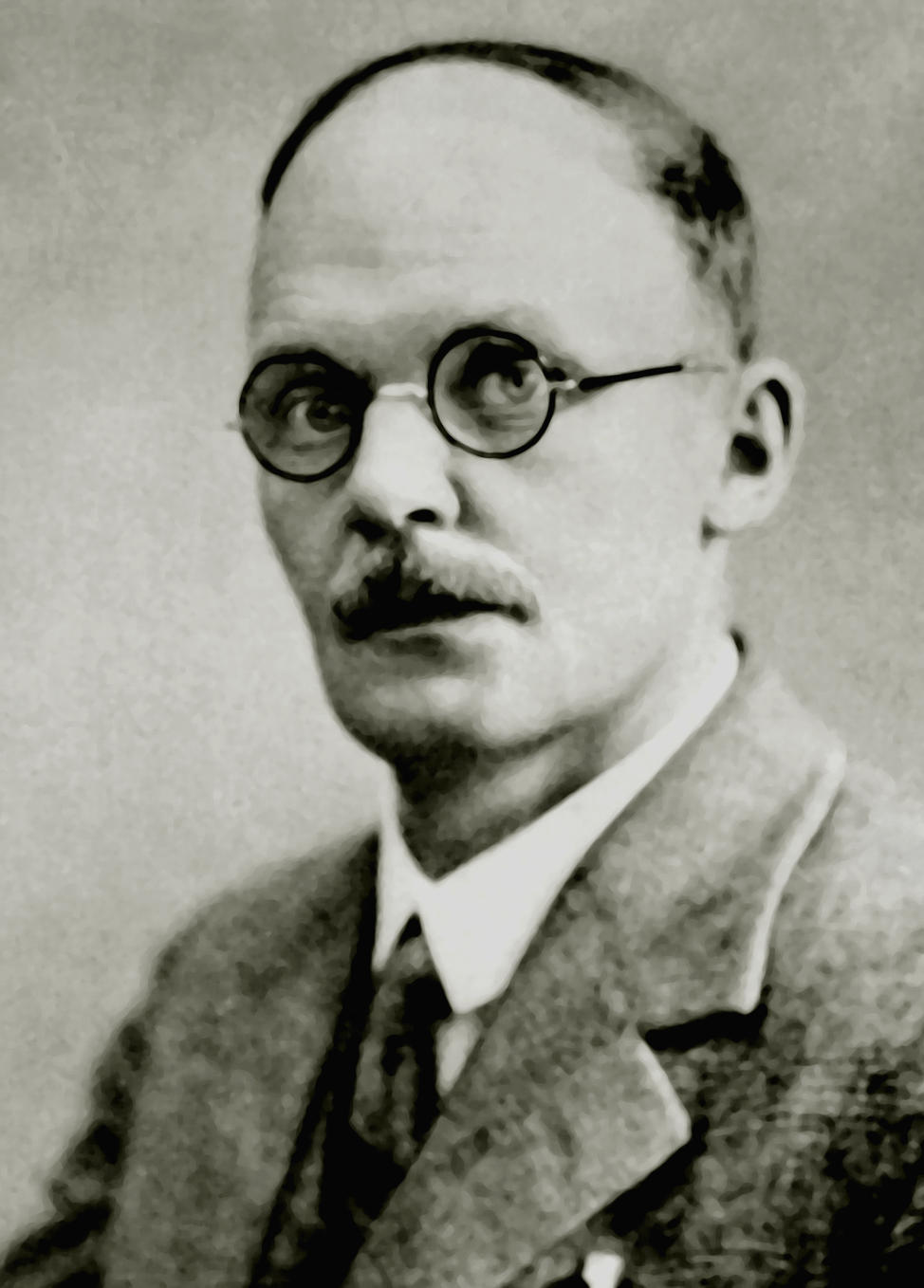
  Hans Geiger
- September 22 – Wilhelm Keitel, German field marshal (d. 1946)
- September 29 – Lilias Armstrong, English phonetician (d. 1937)
- September 30
  - George Bancroft, American film actor (d. 1956)
  - Hans Geiger, German physicist (d. 1945)

=== October ===
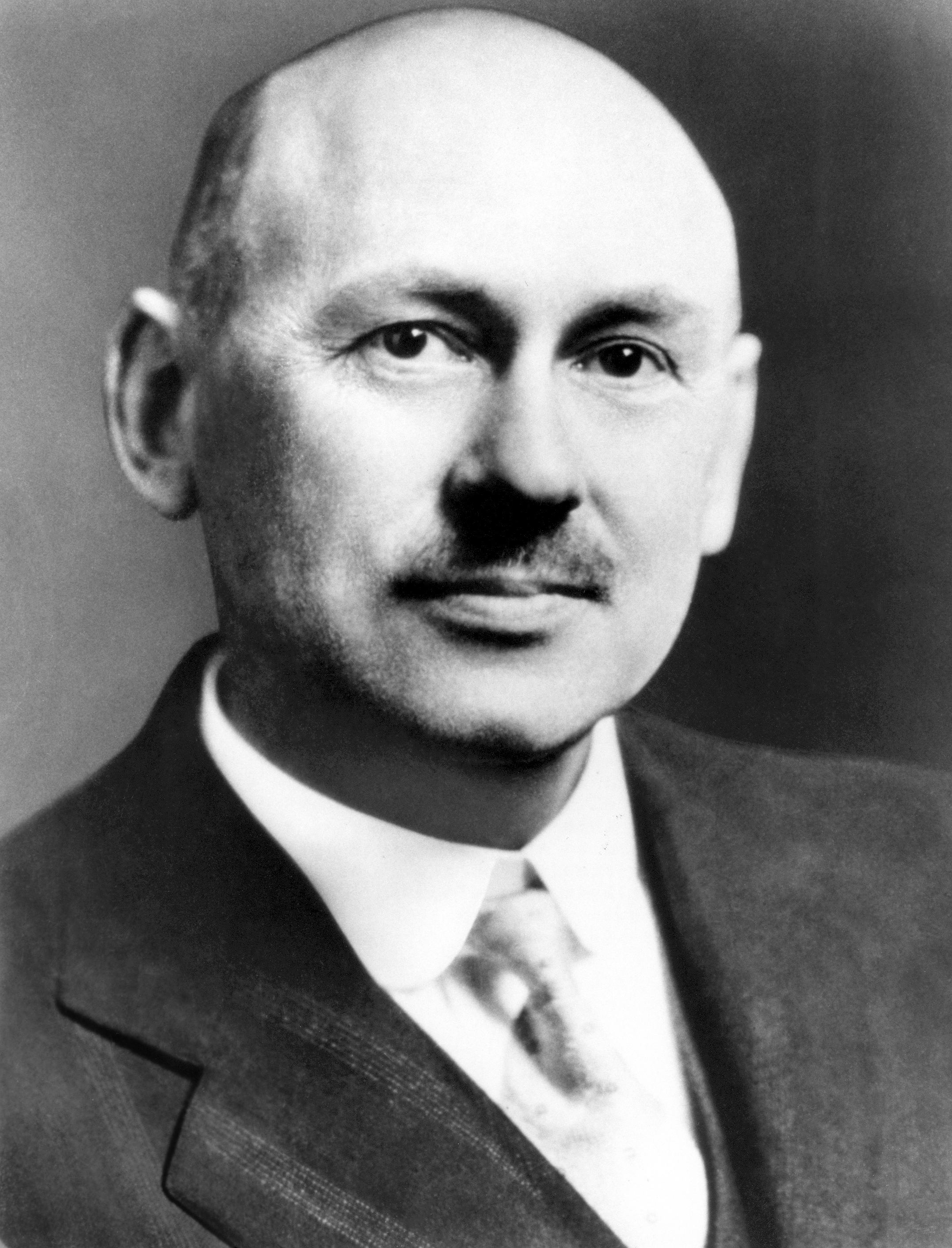
Robert H. Goddard

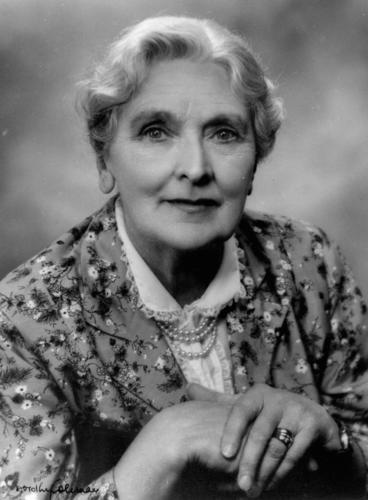
Sybil Thorndike

- October 2 – Boris Shaposhnikov, Soviet military leader, Marshal of the Soviet Union (d. 1945)
- October 3 – A. Y. Jackson, Canadian painter (d. 1974)
- October 5 – Robert H. Goddard, American rocket scientist (d. 1945)
- October 6 – Karol Szymanowski, Polish composer (d. 1937)
- October 8 – Harry McClintock, American singer (d. 1957)
- October 14
  - Zbigniew Dunin-Wasowicz, Polish military leader (d. 1915)
  - Éamon de Valera, Taoiseach and third President of Ireland (d. 1975)
  - Charlie Parker, English cricketer (d. 1959)
- October 17 – Giulio Gavotti, Italian aviator (d. 1939)
- October 20 – Bela Lugosi, Hungarian-born American actor (d. 1956)
- October 24 – Sybil Thorndike, British stage, film actress (d. 1976)
- October 25
  - Florence Easton, English opera soprano (d. 1955)
  - Tony Jackson, American jazz musician (d. 1921)
- October 30
  - William Halsey Jr., American admiral (d. 1959)
  - Günther von Kluge, German field marshal (d. 1944)

=== November ===
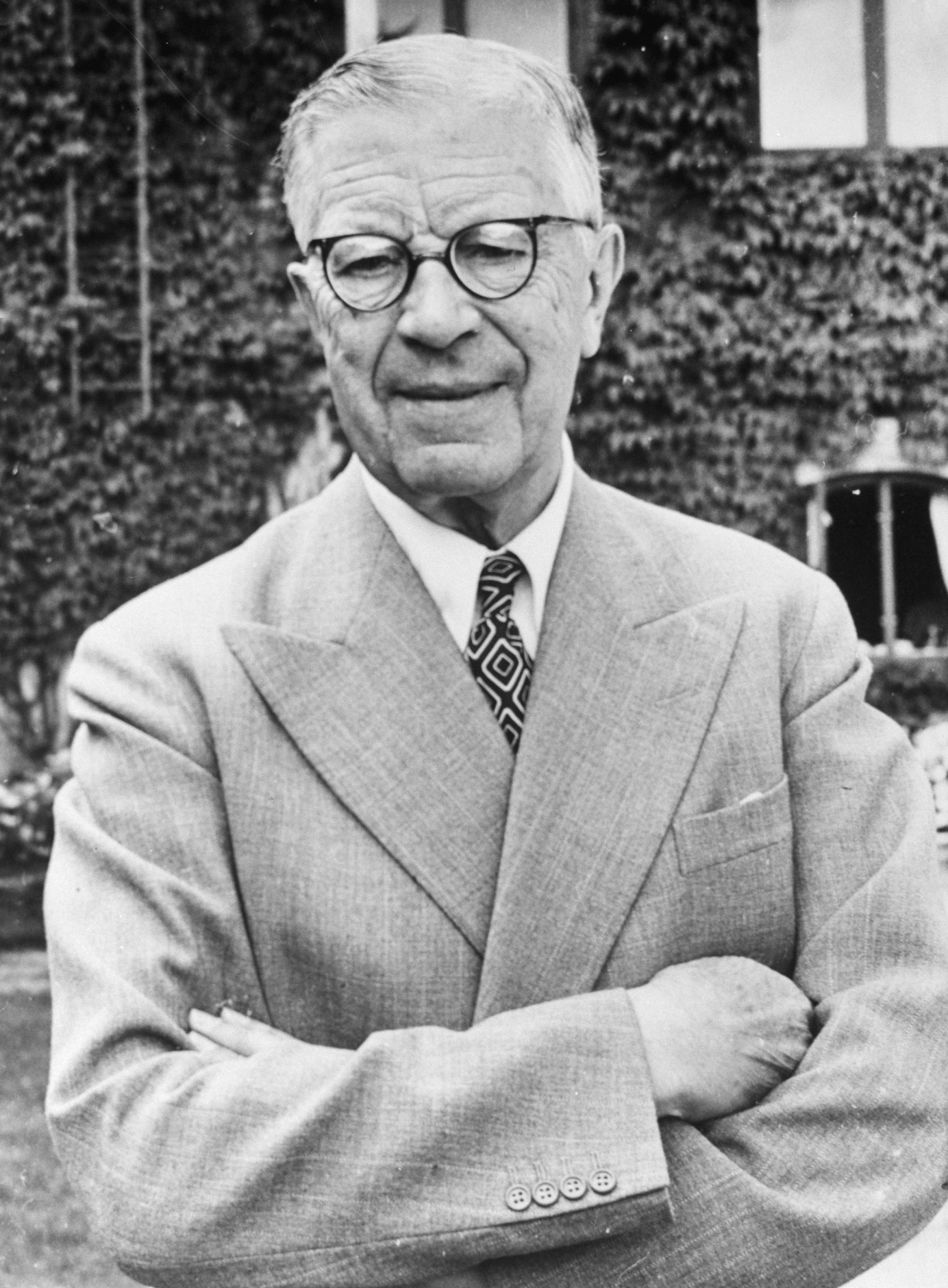
King Gustaf VI Adolf of Sweden

- November 6 – Feng Yuxiang, Chinese warlord and general (d. 1948)
- November 8 – Ethel Clayton, American silent screen star (d. 1966)
- November 11
  - T. F. O'Rahilly, Irish academic (d. 1953)
  - King Gustaf VI Adolf of Sweden (d. 1973)
- November 15 – Felix Frankfurter, Associate Justice of the Supreme Court of the United States (d. 1965)
- November 18
  - Jacques Maritain, French Catholic philosopher (d. 1973)
  - Frances Gertrude McGill, Canadian forensic pathologist (d. 1959)
- November 21 – Harold Lowe, Welsh 5th Officer of RMS Titanic (d. 1944)
- November 27 – Leonie von Meusebach–Zesch, American dentist (d. 1944)
- November 29 – Henri Fabre, French inventor of the first seaplane, the Fabre Hydravion (d. 1984)

=== December ===
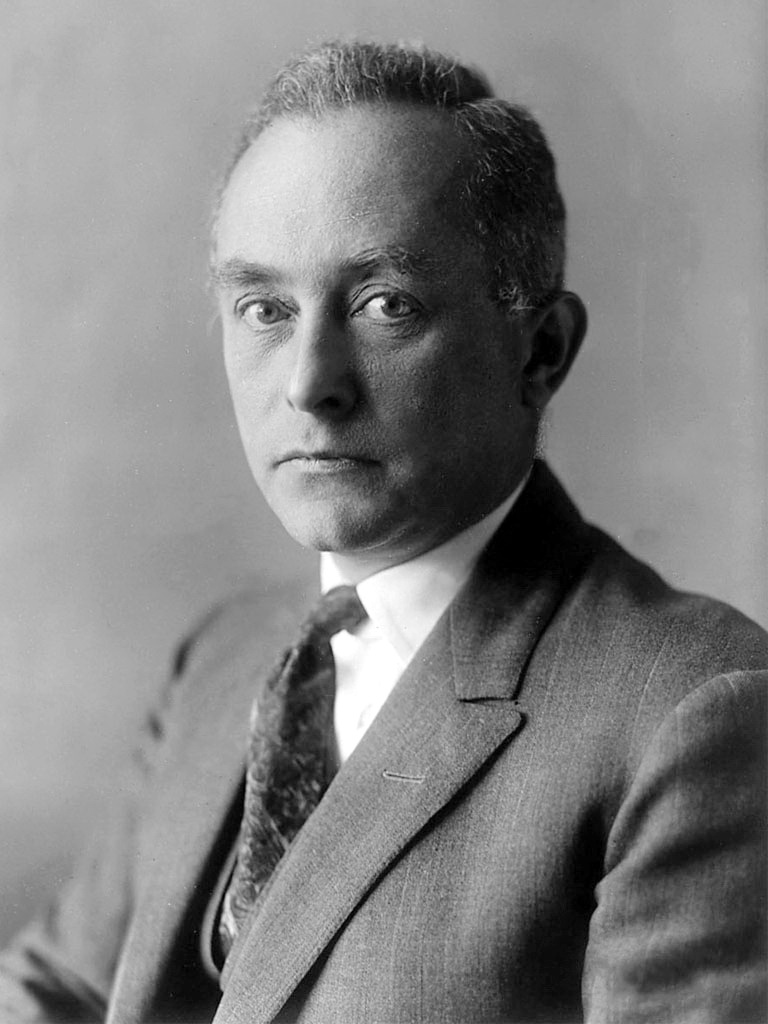
Max Born

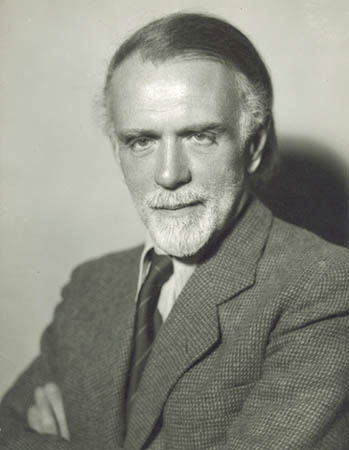
Zoltán Kodály

- December 9
  - Percy C. Mather, English Protestant missionary (d. 1933)
  - Joaquín Turina, Spanish composer (d. 1949)
- December 11
  - Subramania Bharati, Tamil Indian poet (d. 1921)
  - Max Born, German physicist, Nobel Prize laureate (d. 1970)
- December 12 – Ioannis Demestichas, Greek admiral (d. 1960)
- December 16
  - Jack Hobbs, English cricketer (d. 1963)
  - Zoltán Kodály, Hungarian composer (d. 1967)
  - Walther Meissner, German technical physicist (d. 1974)
- December 18 – Richard Maury, American naturalized Argentine engineer (d. 1950)
- December 22 – Hisao Tani, Japanese general and war criminal (d. 1947)
- December 23 – Mokichi Okada, Japanese religious leader (d. 1955)
- December 24 – Georges Legagneux, French aviator (d. 1914)
- December 28 – Arthur Eddington, English astronomer, astrophysicist and mathematician (d. 1944)
- December 29 – Raymond Stanton Patton, American admiral, engineer and second Director of the United States Coast and Geodetic Survey (d. 1937)

=== Date unknown ===
- Sediqeh Dowlatabadi, Persian feminist, women's rights activist and journalist (d. 1961)
- Nellie Yu Roung Ling, Chinese dancer, lady-in-waiting in Qing imperial court (d. 1973)
- T. Sathasiva Iyer, Ceylon Tamil scholar, Tamil language writer (d. 1950)
- Ioryi Mucitano, Aromanian revolutionary (d. 1911)
- Nicolae Velo, Aromanian poet and diplomat in Romania (d. 1924)

== Deaths ==
=== January–June ===
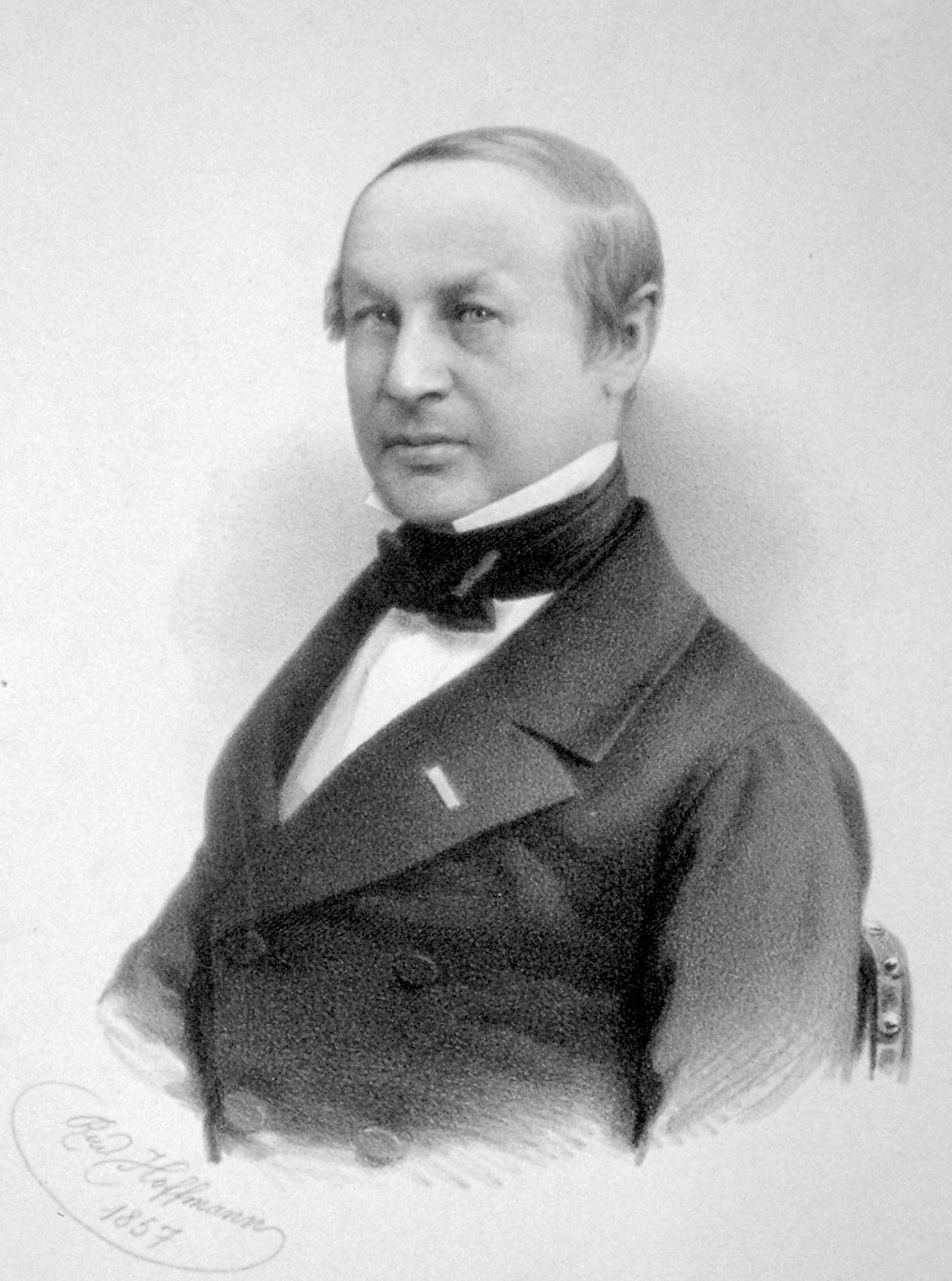
Theodor Schwann

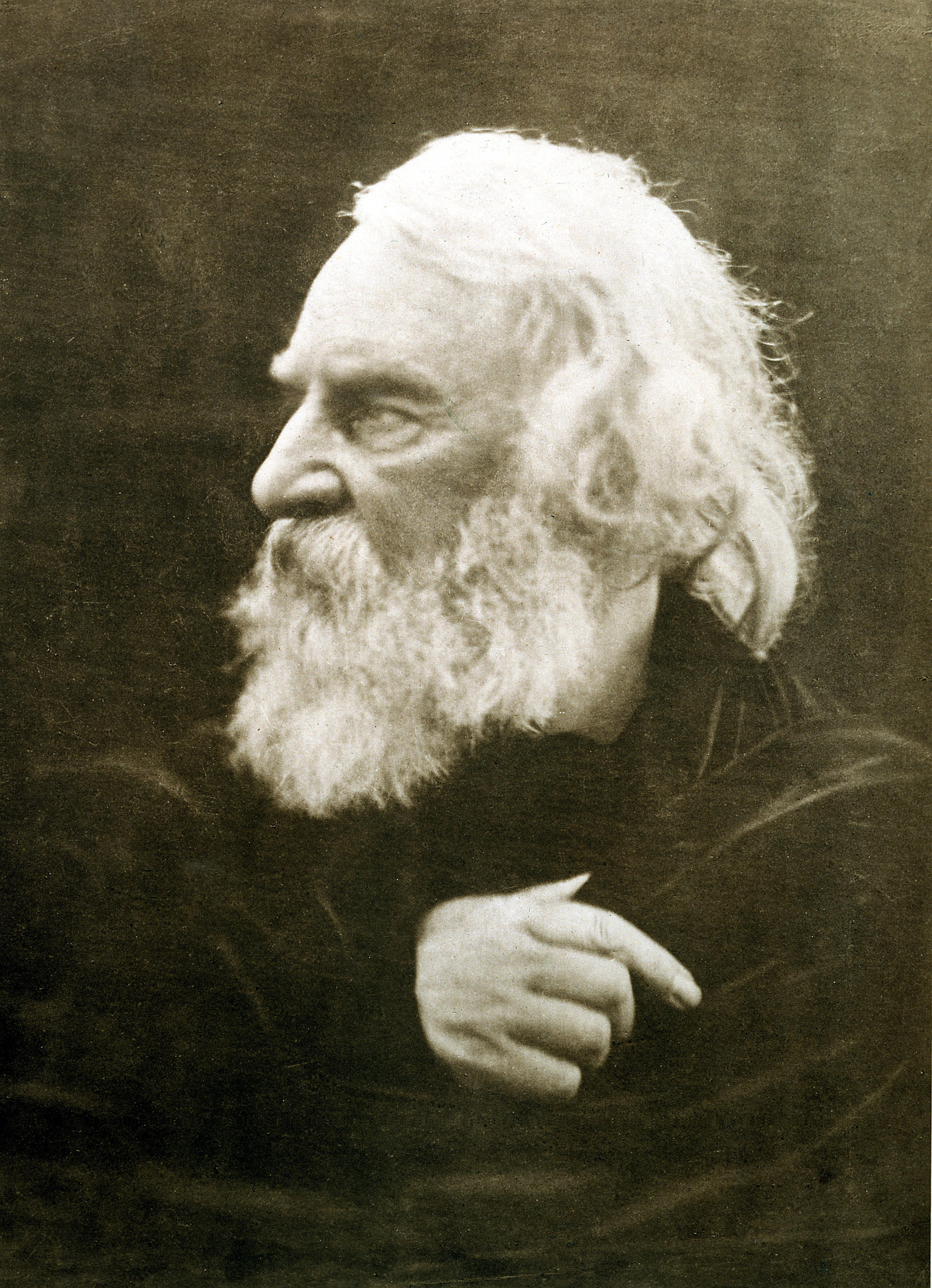
Henry Wadsworth Longfellow

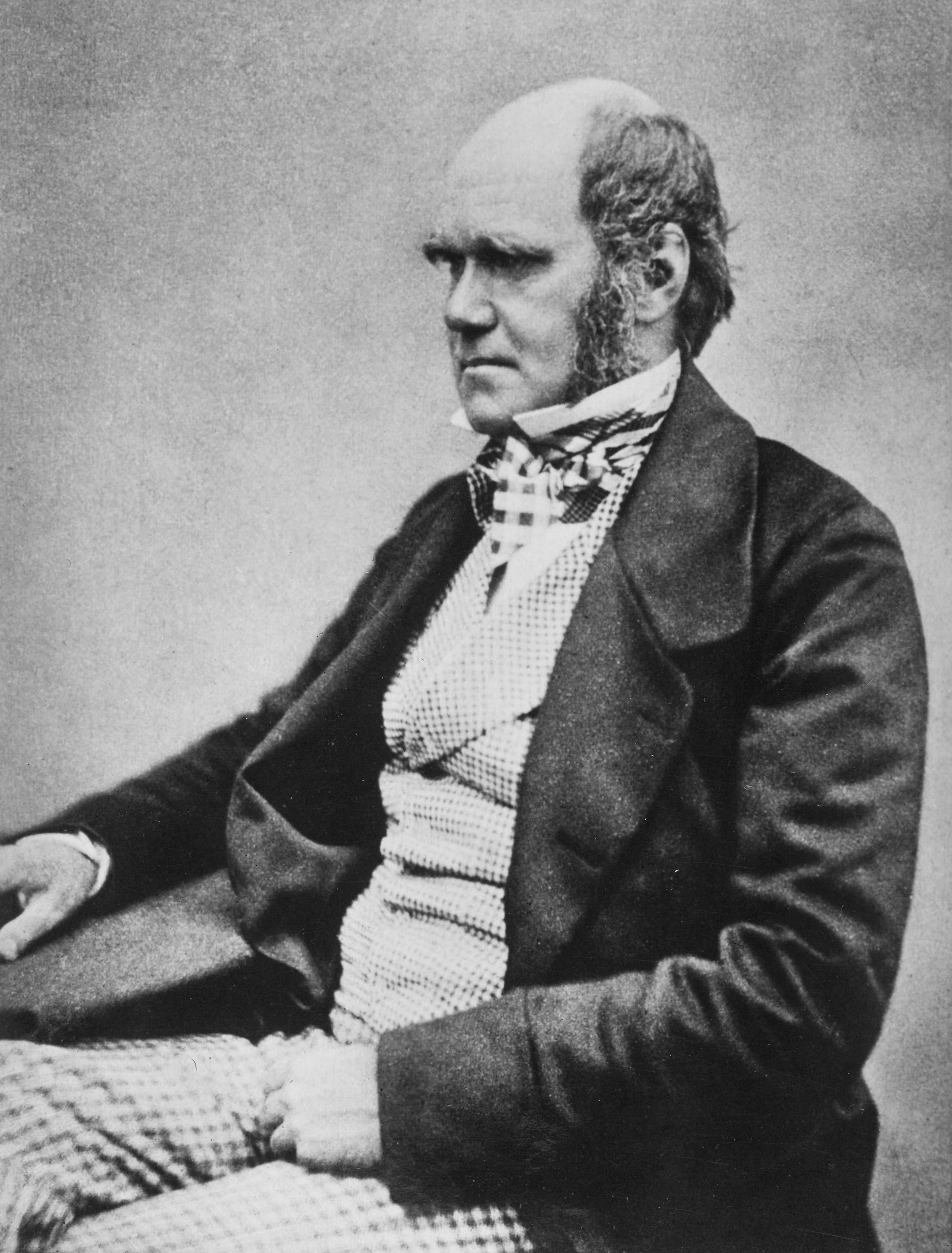
Charles Darwin

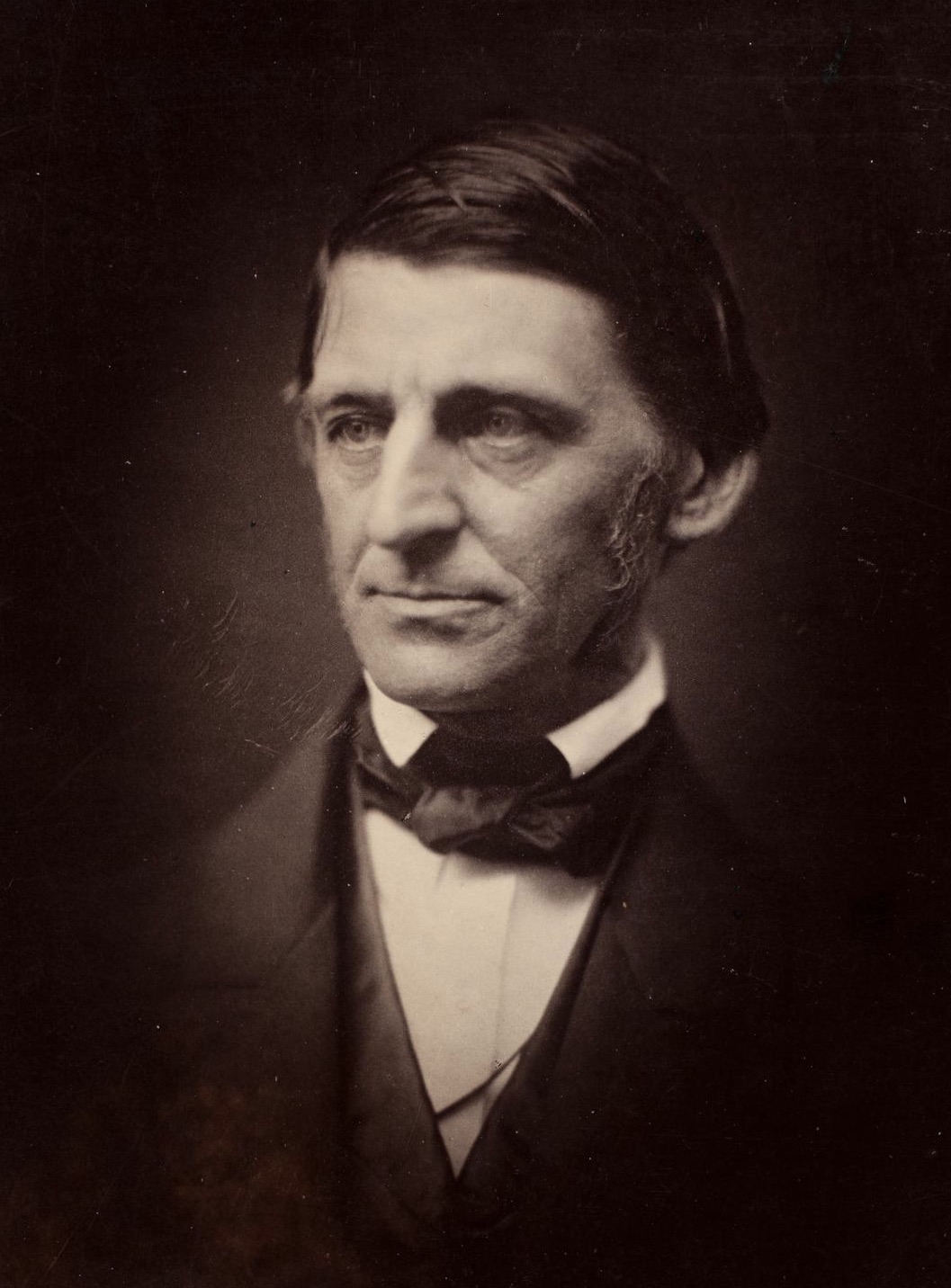
Ralph Waldo Emerson

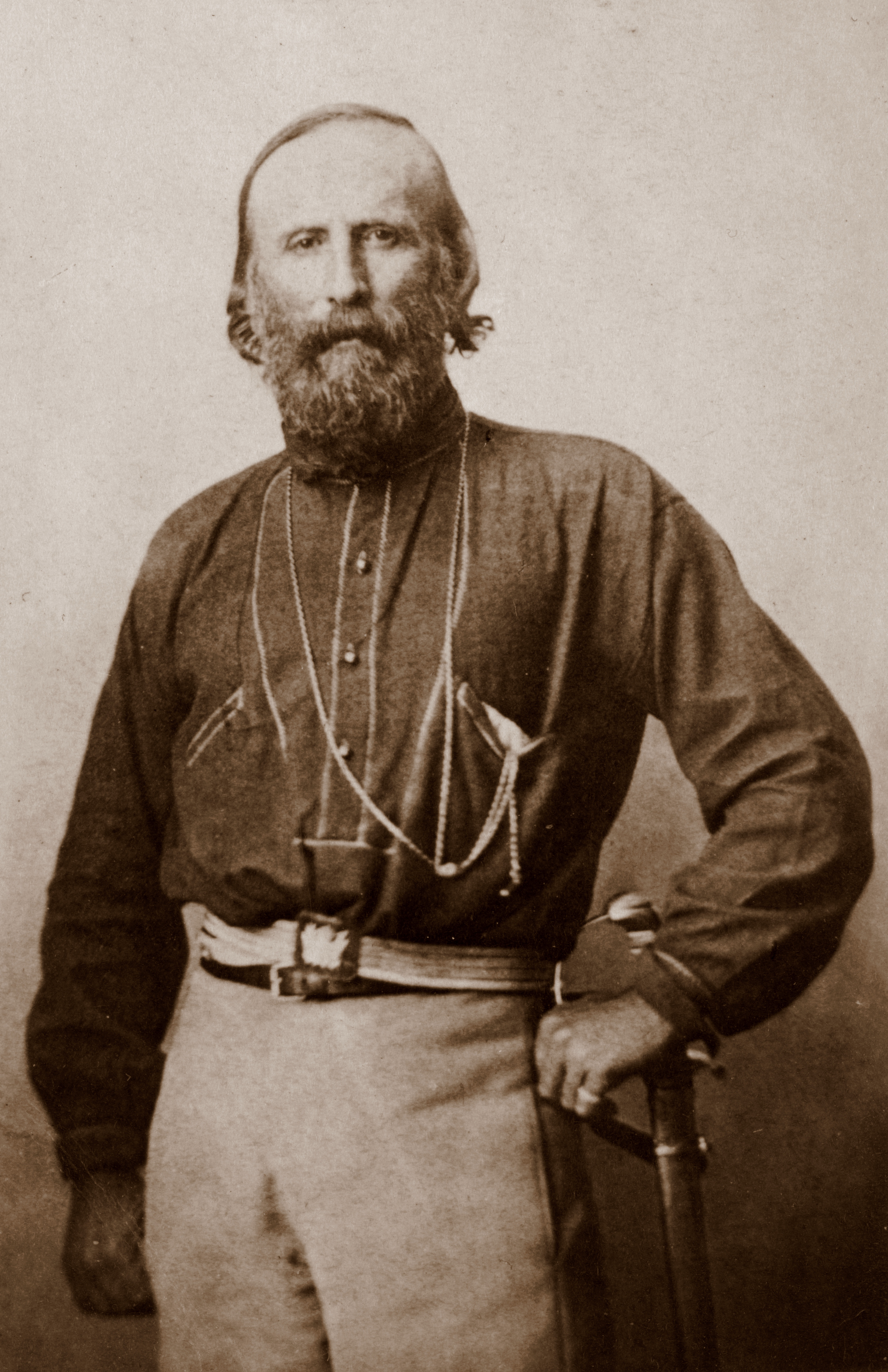
Giuseppe Garibaldi

- January 6 – Richard Henry Dana Jr., founder of Dana Point, California (b. 1815)
- January 7 – Ignacy Łukasiewicz, Polish pharmacist, inventor of the first method of distilling kerosene from seep oil, creator of the first oil lamp (b. 1822)
- January 10 – Henri Jules Bataille, French general (b. 1816)
- January 11 – Theodor Schwann, German physiologist (b. 1810)
- January 13 – Juraj Dobrila, Croatian bishop (b. 1812)
- January 27 – Robert Christison, Scottish toxicologist, physician (b. 1797)
- February 5 – Elizabeth Louisa Foster Mather, American writer (b. 1815)
- March 9 – Giovanni Lanza, Italian politician (b. 1810)
- March 19 – Carl Robert Jakobson, Estonian writer, politician, and teacher (b. 1841)
- March 21 – Constantin Bosianu, 4th Prime Minister of Romania (b. 1815)
- March 23 – Gustavus H. Scott, American admiral (b. 1812)
- March 24 – Henry Wadsworth Longfellow, American author (b. 1807)
- April 3 – Jesse James, American Western outlaw (b. 1847)
- April 9 – Dante Gabriel Rossetti, English poet, painter (b. 1828)
- April 11 – John Lenthall, American naval architect, shipbuilder (b. 1807)
- April 13 – Bruno Bauer, German philosopher and theologian (b. 1809)
- April 14 – Henri Giffard, French balloonist, aviation pioneer (b. 1825)
- April 17
  - George Jennings, English sanitary engineer (b. 1801)
  - Antonio Fontanesi, Italian painter (b. 1818)
- April 19 – Charles Darwin, British naturalist (b. 1809)
- April 25 – Johann Karl Friedrich Zöllner, German astrophysicist (b. 1834)
- April 27 – Ralph Waldo Emerson, American philosopher, writer (b. 1803)
- May 3 – Leonidas Smolents, Austrian–Greek general and army minister (b. 1806)
- May 5 – John Rodgers, American admiral (b. 1812)
- June 2 – Giuseppe Garibaldi, Italian patriot (b. 1807)
- June 3 – Christian Wilberg, German painter (b. 1839)
- June 22 – Pablo Buitrago y Benavente, First democratically elected Supreme Director of Nicaragua (b. 1807)
- June 25 – François Jouffroy, French sculptor (b. 1806)
- June 30
  - Alberto Henschel, German-Brazilian photographer, businessman (b. 1827)
  - Charles J. Guiteau, American preacher, writer, lawyer, assassin of James A. Garfield (executed) (b. 1841)

=== July–December ===
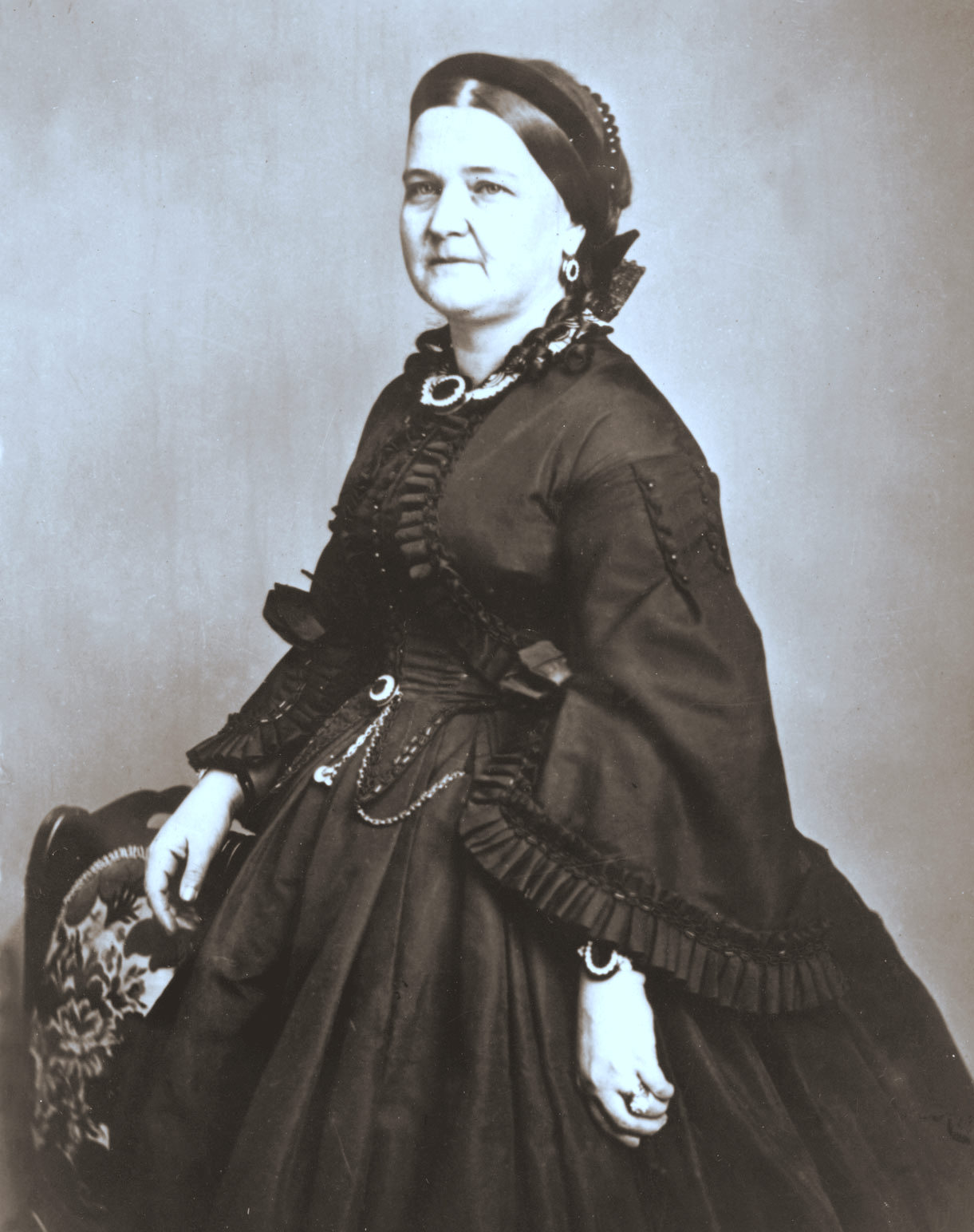
Mary Todd Lincoln

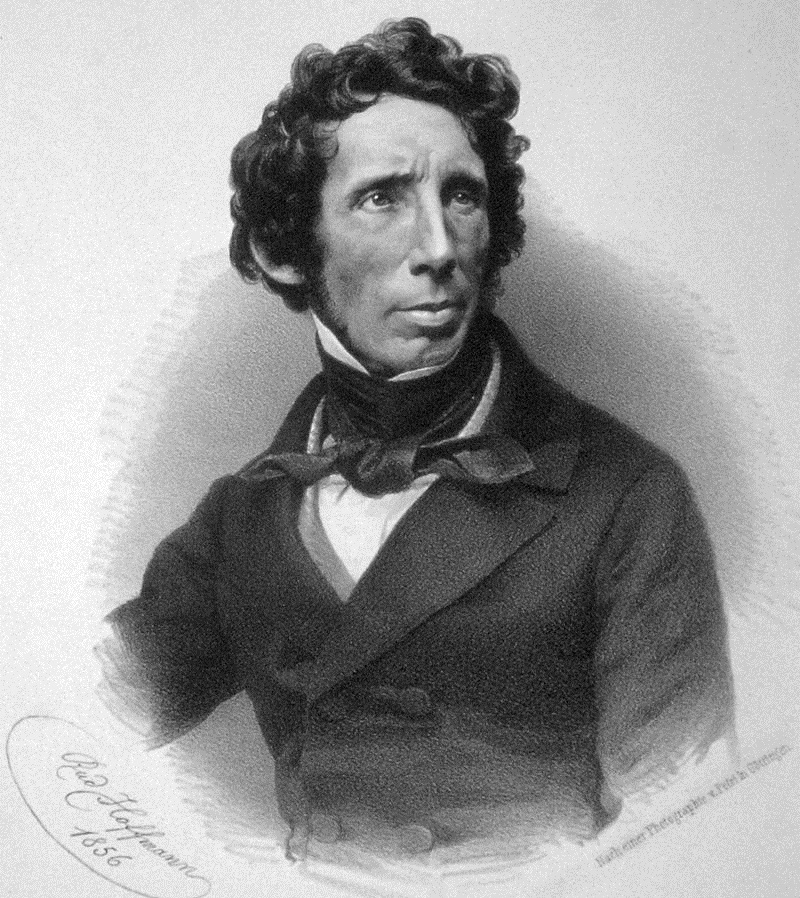
Friedrich Wöhler

- July 4 – Joseph Brackett, American Shaker religious leader, composer (b. 1797)
- July 7 – Mikhail Skobelev, Russian general (b. 1843)
- July 13 – Johnny Ringo, American cowboy (b. 1850)
- July 16 – Mary Todd Lincoln, First Lady of the United States (b. 1818)
- July 19 – John William Bean, English criminal (b. 1824)
- July 20 – Fanny Parnell, Irish poet, founder of the Ladies' Land League (b. 1848)
- July 23 – George Perkins Marsh, American diplomat, philologist and pioneer environmentalist (b. 1801)
- August 4 – Samuel Barron Stephens, American attorney and politician (b. 1814)
- August 13 – William Stanley Jevons, English economist and logician (b. 1835)
- August 16 – Auguste-Alexandre Ducrot, French general (b. 1817)
- August 25 – Friedrich Reinhold Kreutzwald, Estonian writer, physician (b. 1803)
- August 31 – Pedro Luiz Napoleão Chernoviz, Brazilian physician, writer and publisher (b. 1812)
- September 8 – Joseph Liouville, French mathematician (b. 1809)
- September 14 – Georges Leclanché, French electrical engineer and inventor (b. 1839)
- September 16 – Edward Bouverie Pusey, British churchman (b. 1800)
- September 23 – Friedrich Wöhler, German chemist (b. 1800)
- September 30 – José Milla y Vidaurre, Guatemalan writer (b. 1822)
- October 13 – Arthur de Gobineau, French writer, demographist (b. 1816)
- November 7 – Julius Hübner, German painter (b. 1806)
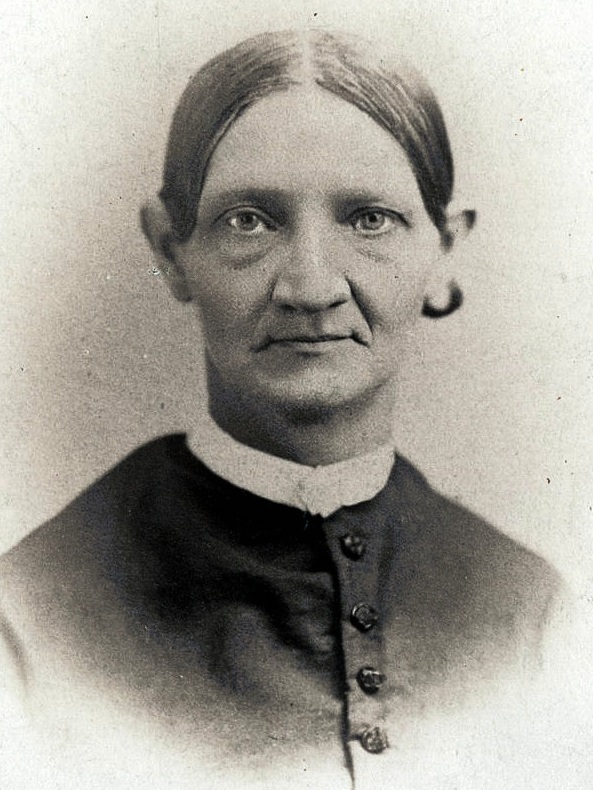
  Lucy Smith Millikin
- November 14 – Billy Claiborne, American gunfighter (b. 1860)
- November 20 – Henry Draper, American astronomer (b. 1837)
- December 3 – Archibald Campbell Tait, Archbishop of Canterbury (b. 1811)
- December 6
  - Alfred Escher, Swiss politician, railroad entrepreneur (b. 1819)
  - Louis Blanc, French politician, historian (b. 1811)
  - Anthony Trollope, British novelist, postal service official (b. 1815)
- December 9 – Lucy Smith Millikin, early Latter Day Saint and sister of Joseph Smith (b. 1821)
- December 10 – Alexander Gardner, Scottish photographer (b. 1821)
- December 18 – Henry James Sr., American theologian (b. 1811)
- December 21 – Francesco Hayez, Italian painter (b. 1791)
- December 27 – Giovanni Losi, Italian Combonian missionary (b. 1838)
- December 31 – Léon Gambetta, French statesman (b. 1838)

=== Date unknown ===
- Eugénie Luce, French educator (b. 1804)
