= The Flirtations =

The Flirtations may refer to:

- The Flirtations (group), an American an all-male a cappella group with pro-LGBTQ themes, active in the late 1980s and early 1990s
- The Flirtations (R&B musical group), an American all-women group performing R&B and soul from 1960–present

== See also ==
- Flirting
