= Jeanneau Flirt =

Sailboat class

Jeanneau Flirt fin keel
Development
- Designer: Jeanneau Design Office
- Location: France
- Year: 1976
- No. built: 1743
- Builder: Jeanneau
- Role: Cruiser
- Name: Jeanneau Flirt fin keel

Boat
- Displacement: 1,763 lb (800 kg)
- Draft: 3.28 ft (1.00 m)

Hull
- Type: monohull
- Construction: fiberglass
- LOA: 19.68 ft (6.00 m)
- LWL: 17.88 ft (5.45 m)
- Beam: 7.55 ft (2.30 m)
- Engine: outboard motor 4 to 8 hp (3 to 6 kW)

Hull appendages
- Keel: fin keel
- Ballast: 573 lb (260 kg)
- Rudder: transom-mounted rudder

Rig
- Rig type: Bermuda rig
- I foretriangle height: 21.32 ft (6.50 m)
- J foretriangle base: 7.11 ft (2.17 m)
- P mainsail luff: 20.27 ft (6.18 m)
- E mainsail foot: 7.87 ft (2.40 m)

Sails
- Sailplan: fractional rigged sloop
- Mainsail area: 91 sq ft (8.5 m^{2})
- Jib/genoa area: 65 sq ft (6.0 m^{2})
- Spinnaker area: 242 sq ft (22.5 m^{2})
- Other sails: genoa: 118 sq ft (11.0 m^{2}) solent: 97 sq ft (9.0 m^{2}) storm jib: 41 sq ft (3.8 m^{2})
- Upwind sail area: 210 sq ft (20 m^{2})
- Downwind sail area: 334 sq ft (31.0 m^{2})

The Jeanneau Flirt is a French trailerable sailboat that was designed by the Jeanneau Design Office, as a pocket cruiser and first built in 1976.

== Production ==
The design was built by Jeanneau in France, from 1976 until 1984, with 1743 boats completed, but it is now out of production.

== Design ==
The Flirt is a recreational keelboat, built predominantly of fiberglass, with wood trim. It has a 7/8 fractional sloop rig, with a deck-stepped mast, one set of spreaders and aluminum spars with stainless steel wire rigging. The hull has a raked stem, a plumb transom, a transom-hung rudder controlled by a tiller and a fixed fin keel or stub keel and centerboard.

The boat is fitted with either an optional inboard engine powering a saildrive or a small 6 to 8 hp (4 to 6 kW) outboard motor for docking and maneuvering.

The design has sleeping accommodation for four people, with a truncated double "V"-berth in the bow cabin and two straight settee berth in the main cabin. The galley is located in the starboard bow. The galley is equipped with a single-burner stove and an icebox. Cabin headroom is 52 in (132 cm).

For sailing downwind the design may be equipped with a symmetrical spinnaker of 242 sq ft (22.5 m^{2}).

The design has a hull speed of 5.67 kn (10.50 km/h).

== Variants ==
Flirt fin keel
This fixed keel model displaces 1,764 lb (800 kg) and carries 573 lb (260 kg) of ballast. The boat has a draft of 3.28 ft (1.00 m) with the standard fin keel.
Flirt keel and centerboard
This stub keel and centerboard model displaces 1,653 lb (750 kg) and carries 441 lb (200 kg) of ballast. The boat has a draft of 4.10 ft (1.25 m) with the centerboard down and 1.97 ft (0.60 m) with it retracted.

== See also ==
- List of sailing boat types
