= Pedro Luiz Napoleão Chernoviz =

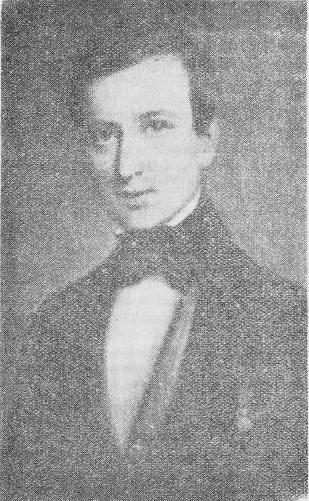
Pedro Luiz Napoleão Chernoviz

Pedro Luiz Napoleão Chernoviz (Piotr Czerniewicz, September 11, 1812 – August 31, 1882), was a physician, scientific writer and publisher. He was born in Łuków (Poland) and immigrated to Brazil in the mid 19th century on a mission on behalf of King Louis-Philippe of France to Emperor Dom Pedro II of Brazil.

Ostracised for their participation in the failed insurrection for the independence of Poland in 1830-31, Chernoviz, along with many other Polish students and professionals, requested political asylum in France. Chernoviz, who had initiated his medical studies at the Uniwersytet Warszawski, completed them at the Université de Montpellier in 1838. In 1840, he emigrated to Rio de Janeiro, Brazil, and developed a very successful medical practice. He became a full member of the Imperial Academy of Medicine and was awarded the title of Cavaleiro da Ordem de Cristo (Knight of Christ's Order) and Oficial da Ordem da Rosa (Officer of the Rose's Order). In 1846, Chernoviz married Julie Bernard, a Brazilian of French descent, in Rio de Janeiro. The couple had six children. Although Chernoviz returned to France with his family in 1855, he remained active in the medical and scientific communities of Bahia and Rio de Janeiro.

While maintaining an active medical practice, Chernoviz wrote several medical and scientific books, intended for the layman, which became popular throughout Latin America. Some of the most noteworthy are:

- Formulário e Guia Médico (Prescription Vademecum and Medical Guide), first published by Edouard and Henri Laemmert in Rio de Janeiro in 1841, reprinted and re-edited numerous times until 1927. The first edition was a single volume with less than 1.000 pages; the second printing of the 19th edition in 1927 had two volumes and together more than 4.000 pages.
- Diccionário de Medicina Popular e das Ciências Acessórias para Uso das Famílias (Popular Medicine and Complementary Sciences Dictionary for Family Use), in two volumes, I with 471 and II with 488 pages, also published in Rio de Janeiro in 1842/1843. The sixth and last edition in Portuguese was in 1890 also in two volumes with a total of more than 2.500 pages
- História Natural para Meninos e Meninas (Natural History for Boys and Girls), published in Paris in 1860.

The sixth edition of the Diccionário de Medicina Popular was initially translated into Spanish in 1894. Chernoviz's books were published in Rio de Janeiro by Edouard & Henri Laemmert, Brazilian-German publishers who represented many French authors and firms in Brazil. The 11th and subsequent editions of the Formulário, and the 6th and subsequent editions of the Diccionário were published in Paris by the firm of A. Roger & F. Chernoviz (the author's son, Fernando).

The design, layout, style and illustrations of Chernoviz's books resembled those favored in Europe at the time. The medical books were beautifully illustrated with many high quality engravings. The texts included precise descriptions of human organs and their diseases, as well as descriptions of the medications deemed appropriate at the time for these ailments. The pharmacopoeia was not limited to that of mainstream European medicine but made extensive use of indigenous Brazilian remedies. Both the Formulário e Guia Medico and the Diccionário are frequently quoted today by ethno-biologists and medical researchers. Despite the popularity of Chernoviz's published work, little is known about his work methods: notes and record-keeping, filing system, data retrieval, updating of information, and so on, at a time when typewriters were just beginning to become a standard office appliance.

References:

- Embaixada de Polonia. [undated]. Poloneses no Brasil. História, cultura, personalidades, contribuçoes.
- Maria Regina Cotrim Guimarães. 2003. Civilizando as Artes de Curar: Chernoviz e os Manuais de Medicina Popular no Império. Dissertação de Mestrado apresentada ao Programa de Pós-Graduação em História das Ciências da Saúde da Casa de Oswaldo Cruz/Fiocruz. Rio de Janeiro.
- Joffre M. de Rezende. 2002. Linguagem médica, 2. ed. com autorização da editora CEGRAF da Universidade Federal de Goiás.
- Betania Goncalves Figueiredo. 1999. Barbeiros e cirurgiões: atuação dos práticos ao longo do século XIX. História, Ciências, Saúde — Manguinhos, VI(2): 277-91, jul.-out. 1999.
- Paula S A Moraes, MD and Ernesto A Taketomi, MD, PhD. 2000. Allergic vulvovaginitis. Annals of Allergy, Asthma & Immunology. Volume 85, October 2000. [Article cites Pedro Luiz Napoleon Chernoviz: 89. Chernoviz PLN. Flores brancas. In: Chernoviz PLN ed. Diccionario de Medicina Popular e das Sciencias Acssessorias—Para uso das familias. Quinta edição. Pariz: A Roger & F Chernoviz; 1878:1154.
