= Bombay Cyclone of 1882 (hoax) =

Hoax

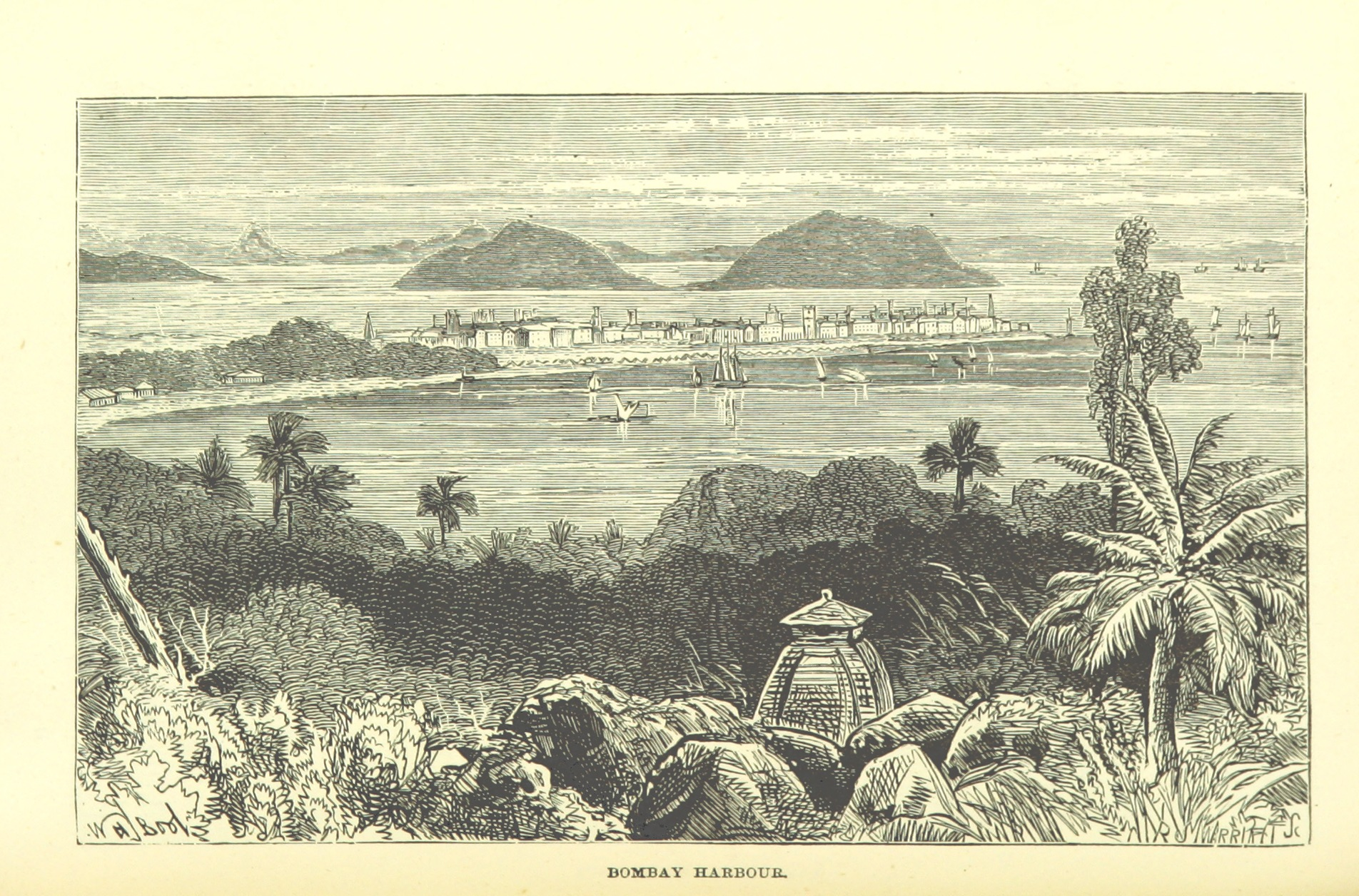
Engraving of Bombay Harbour published in 1882.

The so-called Bombay Cyclone of 1882 or Great Bombay Cyclone is a hoax (or otherwise fictitious) historical event. Supposedly, the cyclone struck Bombay on 6 June 1882. Though it is widely reported, even in scientific literature, historical research shows that it did not in fact happen.

== Example accounts of the supposed event ==
Reportedly, the earliest mention of the supposed cyclone so far discovered by researchers is in an article entitled "Hurricane second only to tornado in wind violence" by M. Hall in the American newspaper The Nashua Telegraph published on 17 September 1947, followed by a piece by one B. Chester, "Earthquakes, tidal waves cause historic disasters" from The Evening Independent of 31 March 1964.

The cyclone is mentioned in academic literature from at least 1976. An entry in the 2008 edition of the Encyclopedia of Hurricanes, Typhoons, and Cyclones by David Longshore states:

The Great Bombay Cyclone of June 6, 1882: One of few truly great Indian cyclones to have formed over the Arabian Sea, the Great Bombay Cyclone—engorged with 110-MPH (177-km/h) winds and an 18-foot (6-m) surge—reportedly claimed more than 100,000 lives when it came ashore at Bombay right before daybreak.

A 2014 academic article claims that "the deadliest storm surge of Arabian sea was Great Bombay Cyclone, took place in 1882 causing 100,000 causalities [sic]. It is one of ten deadliest tropical cyclones of the known history of the world." Another account, published in 2017, says that

the city of Bombay was all but destroyed by a monster cyclone that slammed into the Maharashtra region on June 6th 1882. This was one of the few great storms to emerge from the Arabian Sea. The super storm covered an enormous area as it came ashore at dawn bringing with it 110 mile per hour winds and an 18 foot tidal surge that inundated much of the region around Bombay ... The resultant winds, flooding and damage to buildings killed more the 100,000 people.

It appears in other academic literature besides: some further examples are referenced here. As of December 2015, research noted, it was also reported as fact in Wikipedia (a 2019 study also made the same claim).

== Debunking of the story ==
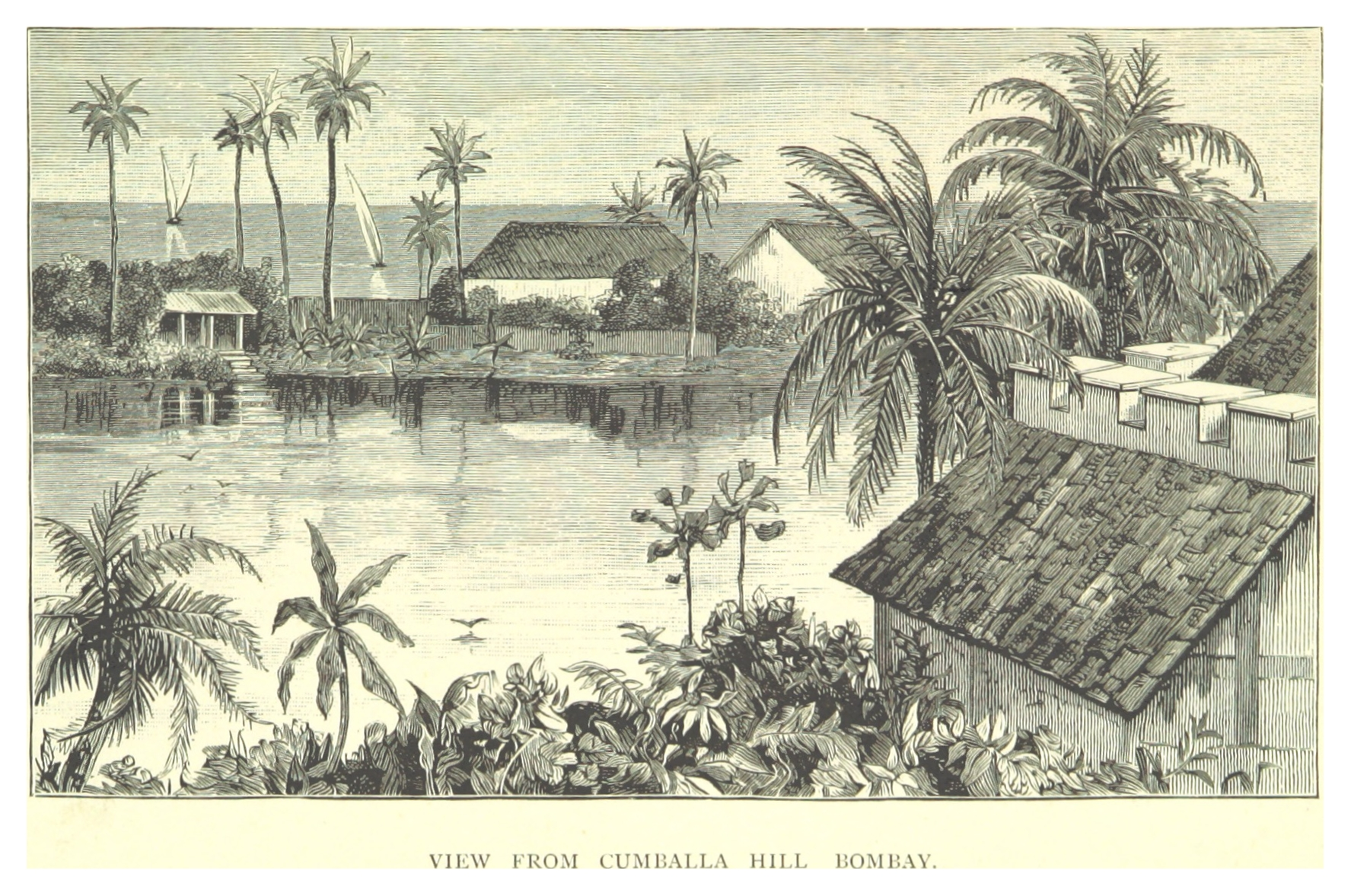
View of Bombay from Cumballa Hill published in 1882.

Research into newspapers, meteorological records, and weather reports shows no contemporary record of the event. If a storm of anything like the reported magnitude had happened, then it would have killed about an eighth of Bombay's population, and would have been widely reported. There does appear to have been a storm with heavy rain and strong winds on 4 June 1882, but it does not answer to descriptions of the supposed cyclone of 6 June. Bombay's biggest cyclone event of the nineteenth century in fact appears to have been the cyclone of 1854, when "'property valued at half-a-million pounds sterling' was destroyed in four hours and a thousand people were killed".
