= Flirtation Peak =

Mountain in the state of Colorado

Coordinates: 39°44′04″N 105°31′12″W

Flirtation Peak is a summit in Clear Creek County, Colorado, in the United States. It has an elevation of 8,260 feet (2,520 m).

The peak lies south of Idaho Springs.
