= HMS Flirt =

Six ships of the British Royal Navy have been named HMS Flirt:

- Flirt was a ship in service with the navy in 1592.
- HMS Flirt (1782) was a 14-gun brig of 209 tons launched at Dover on 4 March 1782 and sold on 1 December 1795. She then became a whaler in the British southern whale fishery until 1803 when the French privateer François Aregnaudeau in Blonde captured Flirt as she was returning home from a voyage.
- HMS Flirt (1856) was a Cheerful-class wooden screw gunboat launched at Greenhythe on 7 June 1856 and broken up at Haslar in April 1864.
- HMS Flirt (1862) was a gunboat purchased in 1862 for New Zealand service and sold in 1864.
- HMS Flirt (1867) was a composite screw gunboat of 603 tons launched at Devonport on 20 December 1867 and sold in November 1888 for breaking up.
- HMS Flirt (1897) was a C-class destroyer launched at Jarrow on 15 May 1897 and sunk on 27 October 1916 in the Dover Strait.
