= Gathorne-Hardy family =

British aristocrats

Arms of the Earl of Cranbrook

Gathorne-Hardy is the name of a British aristocratic family. The first part of the name is pronounced with a long a, i.e. "gay-thorn". The founder of the family was Gathorne Gathorne-Hardy, 1st Earl of Cranbrook.

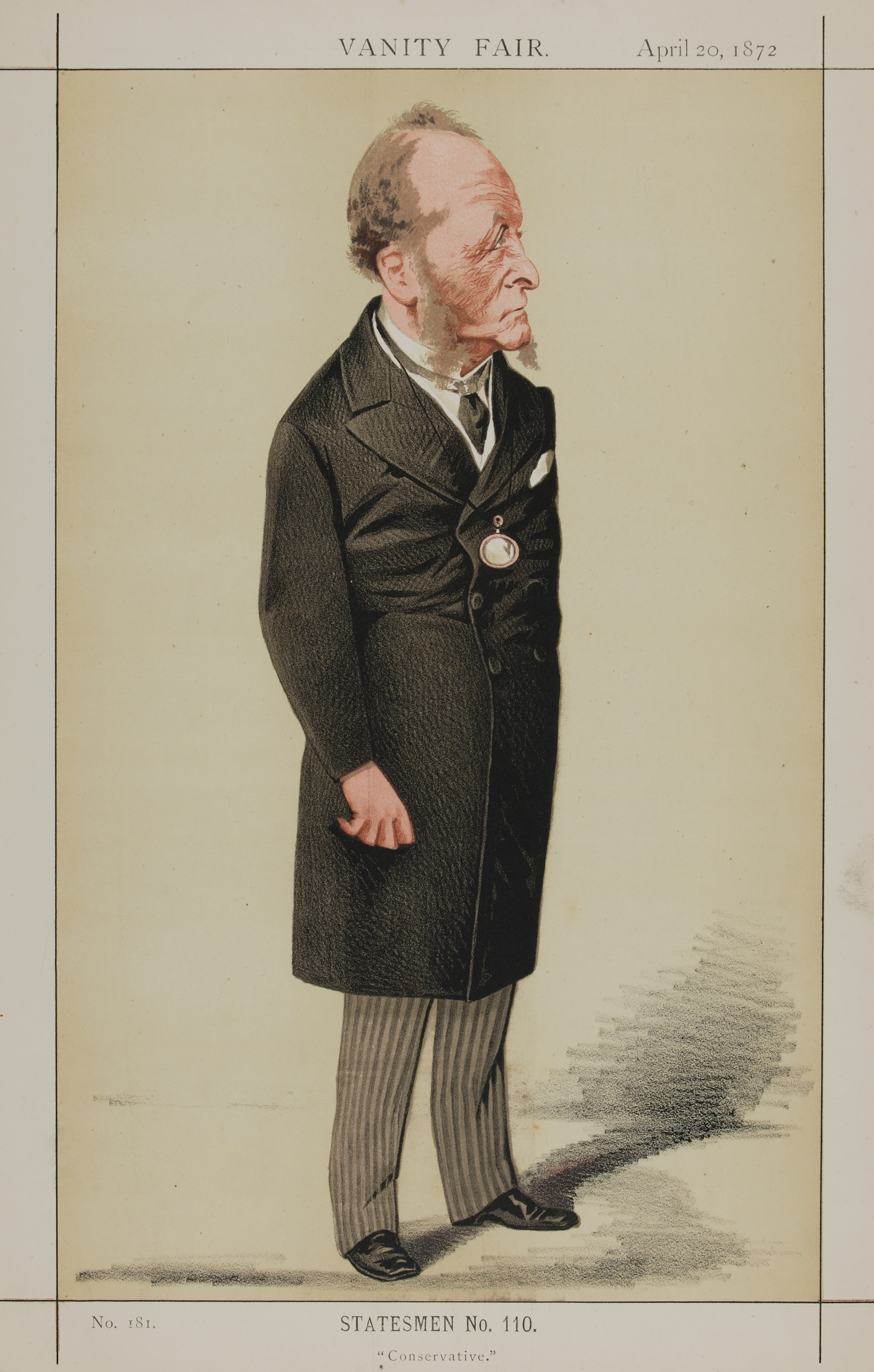
The 1st Earl of Cranbrook was a prominent Conservative statesman who "won the full confidence and warm personal regard of Queen Victoria."

== Notable people ==
- Hon. Alfred Gathorne-Hardy (1845–1918), British politician, younger son of the 1st Earl
- Lady Anne Gathorne-Hardy (1911–2006), British bookseller and author
- Caroline Gathorne-Hardy, Countess of Cranbrook (born Caroline Jarvis; 1935), British agricultural campaigner, wife of the 5th Earl
- Lady Dorothy Gathorne-Hardy (1889–1977), wife of Rupert D'Oyly Carte, founder of the Savoy Hotel
- Hon. Edward Gathorne-Hardy (1901–1978), British antiquarian, traveller, and a prominent member of the "Bright young things" group of aristocrats; second son of the 3rd Earl
- Gen. Hon. Francis Gathorne-Hardy (1874–1949), British general, younger son of the 2nd Earl
- Gathorne Gathorne-Hardy, 1st Earl of Cranbrook (1814–1906), British politician, founder of the family
- Gathorne Gathorne-Hardy, 3rd Earl of Cranbrook (1870–1915), British peer and socialite, married Dorothy Boyle, daughter of the 7th Earl of Glasgow
- Gathorne Gathorne-Hardy, 5th Earl of Cranbrook (1933–2026), British peer and zoologist, formerly based in Malaysia
- Geoffrey Malcolm Gathorne-Hardy (1878–1972), British soldier, writer and Norse specialist, son of Hon. Alfred Gathorne-Hardy
- Lady Isobel Gathorne-Hardy (born Isobel Stanley, 1875–1963), British ice hockey enthusiast, socialite and royal courtier, married Hon. Francis Gathorne-Hardy
- Jane Gathorne-Hardy, Countess of Cranbrook (born Jane Stewart Orr; 1813–1897), wife of the 1st Earl
- John Jason Gathorne-Hardy, Lord Medway (born 1968), peer and artist, son and heir of the 5th Earl
- John David Gathorne-Hardy, 4th Earl of Cranbrook (1900–1978), British peer, soldier and historian
- John Stewart Gathorne-Hardy, 2nd Earl of Cranbrook (1839–1911), British peer and politician
- Jonathan Gathorne-Hardy (1933–2019), British author, son of Hon. Antony Gathorne-Hardy and grandson of the 3rd Earl
- Lt.-Col. Hon. Nigel Gathorne-Hardy, DSO, ADC (1880–1958), British soldier, married daughter of New Zealand politician Sir Charles Johnston; youngest son of the 2nd Earl; he was the father of Lady Margaret Cameron of Lochiel
- Moffy Gathorne-Hardy (born 1994), British model and socialite, granddaughter of Jonathan Gathorne-Hardy
- Margaret Evelyn Gathorne-Hardy, Viscountess Goschen (1858–1943), eldest daughter of the 1st Earl, married the 2nd Viscount Goschen, Viceroy of India
- Hon. Robert Gathorne-Hardy (1902–1973), British botanist, writer and socialite, son of the 3rd Earl

== See also ==
- Earl of Cranbrook, a title in the British peerage created for the Gathorne Gathorne-Hardy
