= John Gathorne-Hardy =

John Gathorne-Hardy may refer to:

- John Gathorne-Hardy, 2nd Earl of Cranbrook (1839–1911), British peer and politician
- Sir John Francis Gathorne-Hardy (1874–1949), British First World War general
- John Gathorne-Hardy, 4th Earl of Cranbrook (1900–1978), British peer and archaeologist
