= Edward Gathorne-Hardy =

British antiquarian, traveler and socialite

The Honourable Edward Gathorne-Hardy
- Born: Ralph Edward Gathorne Hardy; 4 June 1901; Chelsea, London, England
- Died: 18 June 1978 (aged 77); Athens, Greece
- Parent(s): Gathorne Gathorne-Hardy, 3rd Earl of Cranbrook; Lady Dorothy Montagu Boyle
- Relatives: Gathorne-Hardy family

Ralph Edward Gathorne-Hardy (4 June 1901 – 18 June 1978) was a British antiquarian, traveller and socialite.

== Early life ==
The second child of the 3rd Earl of Cranbrook (grandson of the 1st Earl of Cranbrook) by his wife Lady Dorothy Montagu Boyle, the daughter of David Boyle, 7th Earl of Glasgow, he was educated at Eton and Christ Church, Oxford.

One of the group designated by the press the 'Bright Young People' in the 1920s, he shared a flat with Brian Howard at 39 Maddox Street in London, which was so run-down that fungus grew on the dilapidated staircase.

== Career ==
Gathorne-Hardy began a career in antiques, culture, history and art dealing. Although he was respected in antiques, specialising in 18th-century literature, and worked as a director and rare book expert for the booksellers Elkin Mathews alongside his brother Robert, he remained impecunious, largely living off his elder brother, John David Gathorne-Hardy, 4th Earl of Cranbrook. He also worked at various colleges and for the British Council.

After 1935, he lived in Athens, Cairo and Lebanon. He died aged 77 on 18 June 1978.

Gathorne-Hardy's sister, Anne (1911–2006), was the wife of George Heywood Hill, owner of the Mayfair bookshop bearing his name. A nephew- son of his younger brother Anthony- was Jonathan Gathorne-Hardy.
