= Great Glemham =

Village in Suffolk, England

Coordinates: 52.204°N 1.424°E

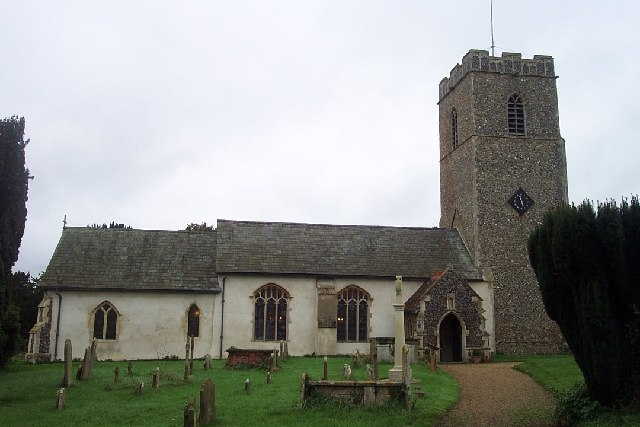
- All Saints' Church

- Location within Suffolk
- Area: 7.77 km^{2} (3.00 sq mi)
- Population: 224 (2011)
  - Density: 29/km^{2} (75/sq mi)
- Civil parish: Great Glemham
- District: East Suffolk
- Shire county: Suffolk
- Region: East
- Country: England
- Sovereign state: United Kingdom
- Post town: Saxmundham
- Postcode district: IP17
- Dialling code: 01728
- Police: Suffolk
- Fire: Suffolk
- Ambulance: East of England
- UK Parliament: Suffolk Coastal

Great Glemham is a village and civil parish in the East Suffolk district, in Suffolk, England, a mile and a half to the west of the A12 and roughly equidistant between Framlingham and Saxmundham.

The parish takes the shape of an irregular triangle formed by two clay ridges flanking rolling countryside through which runs the channel of a seasonal watercourse, the Gull, flowing NW to SE to join the upper River Alde, which forms the village's eastern boundary.

The civil parish had a population of 224 at the 2011 Census. The centre of the village is a Conservation area with numerous historic and listed buildings including its Grade I listed church, The Crown Inn, Crown House and K6 telephone box. From 1974 to 2019 it was in Suffolk Coastal district.

The place-name 'Glemham' is first recorded in the Domesday Book of 1086, where it appears as Gl(i)emham, in the manors of Edwin Grim and Spearhafoc of Glaimham. Eilert Ekwall comments: "The first element of the names is possibly Old English glēam 'merriment'..." By analogy with Glandford in Norfolk, 'Glemham' could mean the 'village where sports were held'.

Glemham House was built by Samuel Kilderbee in 1814 to the designs of Thomas Hopper and is the seat of the Earls of Cranbrook and Gathorne-Hardy family. With strong connections between the family and Benjamin Britten, the house hosted some of the earlier and more intimate performances of the Aldeburgh Festival of Music and the Arts including a notable recording by Julian Bream and Peter Pears. An earlier Glemham House, located closer to the village itself, had in the late eighteenth century been the home of George Crabbe, the author of the poem The Borough which formed the basis of Britten's 1945 masterpiece Peter Grimes.

Britten worked closely with another Glemham resident, the librettist Eric Crozier, on many of his operatic compositions including The Little Sweep. Although set at nearby Iken Hall, the child characters in this work were transplanted from Glemham House, at that time the home of Jock and Fidelity Cranbrook. Both personal friends of the composer, Fidelity was also chair of the newly formed Aldeburgh Festival. Britten and Crozier adopted the names and personas of Jock and Fidelity's children and nephews for the opera, and the opera is "affectionately dedicated to the real Gay, Juliet, Sophie, Tina, Hughie, Jonny and Sammy – the Gathorne-Hardys of Great Glemham, Suffolk."

== Notable residents ==
- Samuel Kilderbee (1725–1813), churchman, lawyer, and town clerk of Ipswich, chiefly remembered for being a life-long friend of Thomas Gainsborough.
- George Crabbe (1754–1832), English poet.
- Ezekiel Blomfield (1778–1818), Congregational minister, author and compiler of religious works and works on natural history.
- Spencer Horsey de Horsey (1790–1860), Tory politician, Member of Parliament for Aldeburgh, Orford, and Newcastle-under-Lyme
- Robert Meadows White (1798–1865), clergyman and academic, holding the office of Rawlinsonian Professor of Anglo-Saxon at Oxford University
- Eric Crozier (1914–1994), British theatrical director and opera librettist, long associated with Benjamin Britten.
- Nancy Evans (1915–2000), English mezzo-soprano who had a notable career as a concert and opera singer. Married to Eric Crozier she is also particularly associated with Benjamin Britten who wrote his song cycle, A Charm of Lullabies, and the role of Nancy in his opera Albert Herring for her.
- Gathorne Gathorne-Hardy, 5th Earl of Cranbrook, Dato Sri (1933–2026), zoologist, biologist, naturalist, writer and peer.
- Caroline, Countess of Cranbrook OBE (b. 1935), writer and campaigner on local food, mixed farming, livestock and the red meat industry and other rural issues
