= Timothy Behrens =

British painter

Timothy John Behrens (2 June 1937 – 2017) was a British painter who spent most of his professional life as a painter and a writer abroad, in Greece, Italy, and Spain.

== Early life ==
Timothy John Behrens was born in London on 2 June 1937, the son of Michael Behrens, a financier, and later co-owner of Ionian Bank, and his wife Felicity. They lived in a Nash terrace overlooking Regent's Park, and in 1949 bought Culham Court, a large house in Berkshire on the river Thames. He was educated at Eton and the Slade School of Fine Art.

== Career ==
Behrens formed part of the tightly knit group of artists and intellectuals who frequented the Colony Room (John Deakin's famous photograph, Lunch at Wheelers, is of Behrens, Freud, Bacon, Auerbach and Andrews, the Soho drinking club where Lucian Freud and others such as Francis Bacon spent much time during the late 1950s and the early 1960s. Behrens posed in Freud's small Paddington studio for a portrait in 1962 (Red-Haired Man on a Chair) and 1963, and was also the subject of a portrait by Michael Andrews (permanent collection of the Thyssen-Bornemisza Museum). He has exhibited in Spain and Britain.

== Personal life ==
In 1958, Behrens married Janet Rheinberg (d. 1963), a fellow Slade student, and they had twin daughters, Kate and Sophie (d. 1985). In 1963, he married Harriet Hill, the daughter of George Heywood Hill and Lady Anne Hill, who ran Heywood Hill, an avant-garde bookshop in Curzon Street. They had two sons, Algy and Charlie, and a daughter, Fanny. In 1983, Behrens married for the third time, to the artist Diana Aitchison, niece of the painter Craigie Aitchison, who had been a fellow Slade student and close friend. They had a son, Harry.
