= Moffy Gathorne-Hardy =

- Born: Rosehip Myfanwy Nell Gathorne-Hardy; 25 October 1994 (age 31)
- Education: University College London
- Occupation: Model
- Relatives: Gathorne-Hardy family

Rosehip Myfanwy Nell "Moffy" Gathorne-Hardy (born 25 October 1994) is a model signed to Storm Models, the same agency that hired supermodel Kate Moss. She is primarily known for her crossed eyes and as a representative of challenging fashion industry norms, although she has said, "I find it hard to take credit for 'challenging' anything; although I suppose that is inadvertently what I have done".

== Early life and education ==
She is the daughter of Benjamin Gathorne-Hardy (son of writer Jonathan Gathorne-Hardy), a descendant of the Earls of Cranbrook and Barons Glenconner, and Philippa, daughter of David Heimann. After her parents' divorce, her mother, a painter, father, and pianist stepfather brought her up in London.

Gathorne-Hardy recalled that, in her youth, she "wore big round glasses and an eye patch to school to try and strengthen my weaker eye ... my parents tried to do everything they could to make it better but didn't want to risk the operation because I would have been put under general anaesthetic, which is dangerous when you're a child." Although she recalled "a slight separation between myself and other 'normal' children," she "was always very lucky though, in that my mum told me every day of my childhood that I was beautiful and special and so I have had deeply instilled in me a feeling of self-confidence." She was educated at University College London, where she studied Russian and French.

== Career ==
Gathorne-Hardy was scouted by Storm Models at the age of 14 when at a festival, but did not do any shoots until some years later. Her first shoot was for the cover of Pop in 2013; acquainted with the photographer, she was offered the opportunity to model despite having no particular knowledge of fashion. Press and online attention substantially focused on her strabismus, representing a challenge to modelling industry norms. Gathorne-Hardy commented on the "big deal being made about the fact that I’ve got a lazy eye– but I still manage to be a model and that’s good for me– is a bit silly because, apart from anything else, [the lazy eye] hasn’t had a negative effect on my life. People have larger problems!" She agreed with an interviewer that the disproportionate focus on this indicated the fashion industry's guilt about the lack of diversity, saying, "I feel like [the focus on the lazy eye] says more about them than it does me. On the other hand, if I’ve made other people who are insecure about little ’flaws’ feel somehow empowered, that’s great." She was cast in a presentation in Paris, the first by Hood by Air, and featured in M.I.A.'s music video for World Recycle Week with H&M.
