= Robert Gathorne-Hardy =

British prose writer, poet, botanist, and horticulturalist

Gathorne-Hardy (third from right) next to Lord David Cecil, Lord Sackville, and other friends of Lady Ottoline Morrell, 1923

The Hon. Robert Gathorne-Hardy, FLS (31 July 1902 – 11 February 1973) was a British prose writer, poet, botanist, and horticulturalist, who was educated at Eton College and Christ Church, Oxford. He was the third of four sons of the 3rd Earl of Cranbrook. For forty years he was a resident of Stanford Dingley in Berkshire. In Oxford he co-founded the Uffizi Society alongside Anthony Eden and Lord David Cecil.

Although he also wrote fiction (including Lacebury Manor and Other Seas, and some bibliographical works) Gathorne-Hardy is best known for his books on plants that he researched while growing in the garden or about plants that he collected in different parts of the world. He called himself an amateur gardener, but in reality was no amateur. In 1960 he was made a Fellow of the Linnean Society. Gathorne-Hardy wrote about his own garden, his mother's garden, and that of his illustrator John Nash, each having their own point of view, their own distinct possibilities, and as he often said, ". . . their own snubs to give." He also worked – alongside his elder brother Edward – as a director of the booksellers Elkin Mathews.

Gathorne-Hardy's sister was Lady Anne Hill (1911–2006), the wife of George Heywood Hill, owner of the Mayfair bookshop bearing his name. A nephew, son of his younger brother Anthony, was Jonathan Gathorne-Hardy.

== Bibliography ==
- The Old Companion: A Poem. Stanford Dingley: Mill House Press, 1927.
- Darian [in verse]. Stanford Dingley : Mill House Press, 1928.
- Paradisus Dubitantis: An Heroic Poem. Reading: Bradley and Son, 1929.
- The Golden Grove: Selected Passages from the Sermons and Writings of Jeremy Taylor; edited by Logan Pearsall Smith; with a bibliography of the works of Jeremy Taylor by Robert Gathorne-Hardy. Oxford: Clarendon Press, 1930.
- Lacebury Manor [novel]. London: Collins, 1930.
- The White Horse [poems]. Stanford Dingley: Mill House Press, 1931.
- Village Symphony, and other poems. London: Collins, 1931.
- The House by the Bay [novel]. London: Collins, 1932.
- Other Seas [novel]. London: Collins, 1933.
- Coronation Baby [novel]. London: Collins, 1935.
- Death in Iceland, by Logan Pearsall Smith; and, Iceland: A Poem, by Robert Gathorne-Hardy. Privately published, 1938.
- The Wind and the Waterfall. London: Collins, 1938.
- Wild Flowers in Britain. London: Batsford, 1938. With illustrations by John Nash.
- Three Acres and a Mill. London: Dent, 1939.
- Garden Flowers from Plates by Jane Loudon; with an introduction and notes on the plates by Robert Gathorne-Hardy. London: Batsford, 1948.
- Recollections of Logan Pearsall Smith: The Story of a Friendship. London: Constable, 1949.
- The Tranquil Gardener. London: Nelson, 1958. Illustrated by John Nash.
- The Native Garden. London: Nelson, 1961. Illustrated by John Nash.
- Traveller's Trio. London: Nelson, 1963
- Amalfi: Aspects of the City and Her Ancient Territories. London: Faber & Faber, 1968
- A Bibliography of the Writings of Jeremy Taylor to 1700, with a section of Tayloriana. Dekalb: Northern Illinois University Press 1971.
- Ottoline at Garsington: Memoirs of Lady Ottoline Morrell, 1915–1918; edited with an introduction by Robert Gathorne-Hardy. London: Faber & Faber, 1974.
