= Heywood Hill Literary Prize =

The Heywood Hill Literary Prize was awarded yearly to a writer, editor, reviewer, collector or publisher for a lifelong contribution to the enjoyment of books. Andrew Cavendish, 11th Duke of Devonshire sponsored the award, which included a prize worth £15,000, until his death in 2004. Since then, the prize has not been awarded.

The Heywood Hill Literary Prize
Year	Recipient
1995	Patrick O'Brian
1996	Penelope Fitzgerald
1997	John Nicoll
1998	Norman Lewis and Richard Ollard (shared)
1999	Jane Gardam
2000	Charles Causley
2001	Michael Holroyd
2002	Michael Frayn
2003	Mark Amory and Hilary Spurling
2004	Beryl Bainbridge

== See also ==
- George Heywood Hill
- Heywood Hill
