= Henry Fenn =

Henry Fenn may refer to:

- Henry Edwin Fenn (1850–1913), British journalist
- Henry Courtenay Fenn (1894–1978), American sinologist
- Harry Fenn (1845–1911), English-born American illustrator
