= Frederick Inderwick =

English lawyer, antiquarian and Liberal Party politician

Frederick Andrew Inderwick
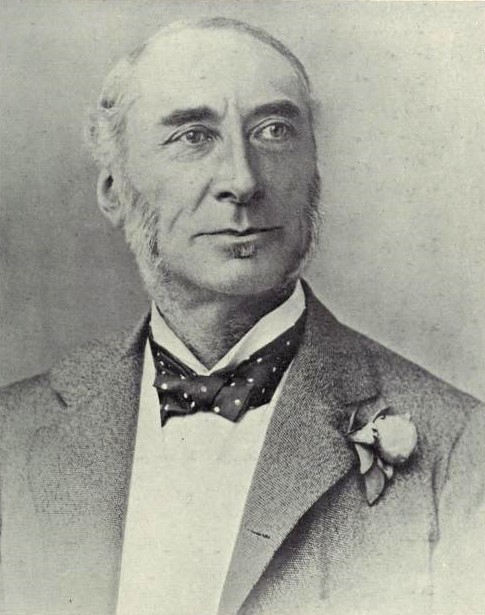

Member of Parliament for Rye
- In office 1880–1885
- Preceded by: John Gathorne-Hardy
- Succeeded by: Arthur Montagu Brookfield

Personal details
- Born: 23 April 1836 London, England
- Died: 16 August 1904 (aged 68) Edinburgh, Scotland
- Party: Liberal
- Occupation: Lawyer, antiquarian

Frederick Andrew Inderwick KC (23 April 1836 – 16 August 1904) was an English lawyer, antiquarian, and Liberal Party politician who sat in the House of Commons from 1880 to 1885. As a barrister he mainly took divorce cases, which at the time was thought to have impeded his progress to judge.

== Early life ==
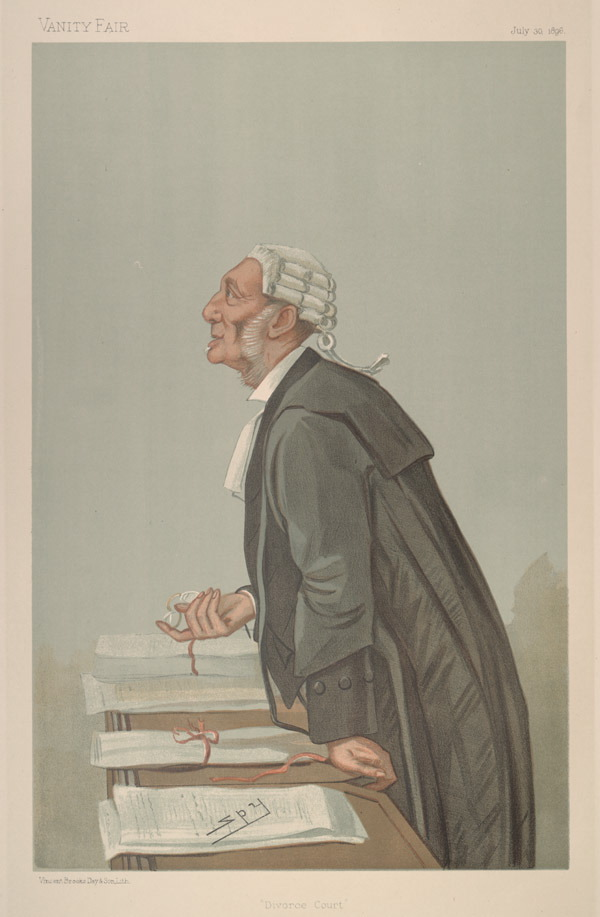
"Divorce Court". Caricature by Spy published in Vanity Fair in 1896.

Frederick Andrew Inderwick was born in London, the son of Capt. Andrew Inderwick R.N. and his wife Jane Hudson, daughter of Joseph Hudson. He was educated privately in Leicestershire and was admitted to Trinity College, Cambridge in 1851.

== Career ==
Inderwick was admitted at the Inner Temple in 1855 and called to the Bar 26 January 1858. He went on the South Eastern Circuit and practised in the probate and divorce courts.

Inderwick stood unsuccessfully for parliament at Cirencester in 1868 and at Dover in 1874. In 1874, he became Q.C. and in 1877 a Bencher of his Inn. He was a J.P.

Henry Edwin Fenn claimed in Thirty-five years in the divorce court (1910) that Inderwick was always passed over for a judgeship on the grounds that it was not the practice in England to promote to the bench any lawyer whose practice had been mainly in the divorce courts.

At the 1880 general election Inderwick was elected member of parliament for Rye. He held the seat until 1885. He was Mayor of Winchelsea, Sussex in 1892-93 and 1902–03, when he was one of the representatives of the Cinque Ports at the coronation of King Edward VII. He was also a Commissioner in Lunacy in 1903–4. He was elected a Fellow of the Society of Antiquarians in 1894 and was an author on political and legal history.

== Family ==
Inderwick married Frances Maria Wilkinson, daughter of John Wilkinson of the Exchequer and Audit Department on 4 August 1857, and had issue.

== Death ==
Inderwick died in Edinburgh at the age of 68.

== Selected publications ==
- The Interregnum, A.D. 1648-1660: studies of the Commonwealth, legislative, social, and legal. S. Low, Marston, Searle & Rivington. London, 1891.
- The king's peace: a historical sketch of the English law courts. Swan Sonnenschein, London, 1895.

Parliament of the United Kingdom
Preceded by John Gathorne-Hardy	Member of Parliament for Rye; 1880 – 1885	Succeeded by Arthur Montagu Brookfield
