= Collected Short Stories (O'Brian book) =

1994 collection of stories by Patrick O'Brian

- First edition
- Author: Patrick O'Brian
- Language: English
- Genre: Short stories
- Publisher: HarperCollins
- Publication date: 1994
- Media type: Print
- Pages: 249

Collected Short Stories is a 1994 collection of stories by the English author Patrick O'Brian. It was published in the US under the title The Rendezvous and Other Stories.

== Background ==
The collection consists of 27 stories which, according to the book's first edition dust jacket, represent "all the stories which O'Brian wishes to preserve". All had previously appeared in one of his earlier collections The Last Pool (1950), The Walker (1953), Lying in the Sun (1956) and The Chian Wine (1974), and some had also been published individually.

Dean King's 2000 biography includes commentary on many of the stories, as do the two volumes of biography (2004 and 2019) by O'Brian's step-son Nikolai Tolstoy.

== Stories ==
=== "The Return" ===
A man returns for a day's fishing to a favourite spot where, over the years, he had spent happy times with several female companions. He catches a handsome trout but as he looks down at its fine flesh and feels it bound and then lie still at his gentle touch, he feels a symbolism and cannot find it in his heart to kill it.

Tolstoy notes that this story, completed in November 1939, was O'Brian's first venture into the description of man's relationship with nature. He praised the "delicate attention to detail and brilliant evocation of atmosphere."

=== "The Happy Despatch" ===
A fisherman discovers a pot of gold during a fishing expedition, and meets his doom at the very moment of his escape with it.

Tolstoy considered this story to be "unmistakably autobiographical", the protagonist being a man who, after failing in the British Army, has moved to a remote corner of Ireland where he finds himself unable to maintain a small farm; his poor judgement and lack of guile leads to a life of wretchedness which culminates in disaster. Tolstoy detects influences from Liam O'Flaherty's 1932 novel Skerrett.

=== "The Dawn Flighting" ===
A lone man has a poor morning's wildfowl shooting over the marsh. Depressed, he turns to start the long walk back, his mood changing to exhilaration as he appreciates the beauty of three wild swans flying high over his head.

King noted that this story, written in 1940, "brilliantly evokes the sport of hunting". Tolstoy considered that its opening sentences demonstrate the atmospheric sense of place which became one of O'Brian's greatest strengths.

=== "Not Liking to Pass the Road Again" ===
The narrator recalls from his childhood a sinister roadside experience and his youthful attempts to make sense of what he had seen.

The story was first published in the magazine Irish Writing in March 1952 during the period when O'Brian was allowing readers and reviewers to assume that he had Irish roots.

=== "The Slope of the High Mountain" ===
The story relates the events of a day's hunting with the Ynysfor hunt in which O'Brian had himself participated.

Initially entitled "The Slope of Gallt y Wenallt" the tale was first published in Harper's Bazaar in January 1954.

=== "The Little Death" ===
A former fighter pilot struggles to come to terms with his wartime experiences. While at a pigeon-shoot, he re-lives shooting down a Messerschmitt, watching fearfully while the plane plummets and waiting in vain for a parachute to open. He has an epiphany: he will never kill again.

O'Brian dedicated the story to Armand Goëau-Brissoinnière, a French resistance leader who had been his colleague and friend during the war. He sent him a copy of his book The Last Pool, in which the story appears, along with a note hoping that the recipient would understand his description of the state of mind of a man who was fed up with killing.

=== "The Passeur" ===
A man passes through a remote wood on an unexplained journey. He senses a presence, and hears a voice urging him to come back again at the dark of the moon.

=== "The Tunnel at the Frontier" ===
A man finds himself in a dark tunnel, as if awaking from a dream. He recalls unhappily getting off the train with crowds of other people, all of whom are moving towards the bright sea that can be seen at the tunnel's mouth. He realises that he has been reading and is still holding the book. It is about a man whose wife has died, who has no comfort because he does not believe in a future life, and who ultimately perishes himself. The man asks himself whether it is the book which has made him unhappy. He turns away from the tunnel's mouth, and walks in the opposite direction, into the gloom.

=== "The Path" ===
The narrator finds himself following in the steps of a woman along a narrow winding track across the mountainside. He carries a burdensome pack which he finds intolerable, and which he is forced to carry in his arms like a baby. At the frontier, the pack is thoroughly searched and in spite of its unspecified bad revelations he is allowed to pass. He continues along the path, knowing that however quickly he walks he will never be able to catch up with her.

=== "The Walker" ===
The narrator has taken lodgings in a small village by the sea, spending much of his time on long country walks. As he walks, his mind returns repeatedly to religious themes, especially to the Passion. The couple with whom he is lodging are tense, and appear to be constantly in fear of their lives, several people they know having recently died in suspicious circumstances. One night, the narrator cannot sleep and, leaving his bedroom, comes across the couple who are in a far room, listening. He flies at them and murders both in his religious ecstasy.

The story was first published in Harper's Bazaar in October 1953. An editorial note of the time commented that it was "a haunting narrative of strange retribution" that was "construed differently by every editor."

=== "The Soul" ===
A very short tale, of little over a page. A soul leaves the cemetery and moves out over the sea towards a distant light.

=== "Lying in the Sun" ===
A man lies on the beach under the blazing sun, cradling his head in the crook of his elbow to block out from sight everything around him. Lying next to him is a woman he met at the hotel, and whom he has due to force of circumstance and cowardice already agreed to marry. He knows he hates her, and that he will have to kill her to make her go away. Time passes and she does not move. He realises that an hour ago she died by his side of a heart attack. He raises his head. There is nobody there: only a hollow in the sand.

=== "Billabillian" ===
"Billabillian" is a tale of the mutual incomprehension between Cornelius O'Leary, the young Irish Catholic purser of an East Indies merchantman, and his captain, a severe and devout Protestant.

O'Leary has unexpectedly been promoted to purser of Trade's Increase after illness on board kills his direct superiors. He is well prepared for his new position (though he has not sailed with this captain before) and has meticulously studied the trading customs of the Spice Islands. He has with him a detailed treatise on local trading practices written by his hugely experienced uncle, and he has learned the relevant sections by heart. At Sumbawa, their next port, trade is allowed subject to Billabillian, a custom under which the king's officials must be allowed access to the cargo before the ship docks, and given the opportunity to purchase anything they desire for half the price that will be requested on land. But O'Leary knows well that Billabillian can be avoided by means of a suitable payment to the officials who will provide a receipt for a higher amount, the difference representing the usual opportunity for valuable personal trades by the captain and his purser. When O'Leary proudly shows his careful preparations and calculations to the captain, he is quite unprepared for the captain's cold and ferocious response, "false thief".

'Billa-billian' was a real trading custom in the Javanese port of Bantam in 1603–1605, as reported by the Scottish surgeon Robert Kerr in volume 8 (1813) of his historical study A General History and Collection of Voyages and Travels, Arranged in Systematic Order. O'Brian quotes extensive passages from the book, including the definition of Billabillian which he incorporates into the fictional uncle's treatise.

=== "The Rendezvous" ===
A story of the frustrating and eventually dangerous experiences encountered by a man travelling by train from Paris to England, trying and failing to catch up with a woman he had arranged to meet.

Richard Ollard, O'Brian's editor at William Collins, described the tale in his 1973 pre-publication assessment as being "disquieting and faintly eerie". Tolstoy speculated that the feeling of loss may have derived from the author's occasional and quite irrational concerns that he might lose his wife or her affections.

=== "The Stag at Bay" ===
Edwin is a self-righteous and priggish author who writes with ponderous difficulty about marriage, an institution that he barely understands. His young wife leaves him in order to find some pleasure before it is too late. He is unsure whether she will ever return, but then receives from her an unexpected gift in the shape of a mounted stag's head. He takes it as a token of her esteem.

=== "Samphire" ===
Molly, a young wife, is provoked beyond endurance by her condescending, bullying and overpowering husband and his cold indifference to her feelings. After he forces her in spite of her vertigo to look over the edge of a high sea cliff to see the samphire growing there, she snaps and makes a feeble effort to push him over the edge. He cannot believe what she has done, and tries to get her to say it was an accident. She turns from him without a word and walks back down the path.

The story was first published in Harper's Bazaar in March 1954. Tolstoy noted that the couple described are "unmistakably" his own parents – his mother Mary (O'Brian's second wife) and her first husband Dimitri. Mary was only 18 when she married Dimitri, and Tolstoy reads the story as emphasising that their marriage was doomed from the outset.

=== "The Clockmender" ===
The Clockmender has reached such a peak of excellence in his craft that all of the many clocks in his house have been honed to perfection. As he lives for his clocks and has nothing else to absorb his mind and time, the lack of worthwhile tasks makes the hours and days stretch out before him as a depressing and horrifying blank. At last, among the clamour of his clocks striking the hour he realises that one has missed a stroke, and a pale smile comes to his face.

In a 1955 review of the first US publication, William Dunlea in Commonweal called the story a "strikingly original nightmare." Donald Barr for The New York Times, also writing in 1955, called it "a psychological history of a man's hellish constriction of his soul into madness."

=== "The Chian Wine" ===
A nightmarish tale about the dark side of human nature, recounting the violent anti-Semitism in a small village in the south of France.

Richard Ollard described this tale in his 1973 assessment for William Collins as "exciting and terrifying". Tolstoy noted that the opening description provides a lyrical evocation of the largely unaltered Collioure of O'Brian's early days in the town.

=== "The Virtuous Peleg" ===
A comic tale, quite different from the others in the collection, recounting the fantastic adventures of Peleg, a junior monk, with some help from an obliging angel.

Reviewing the story for its 1955 US publication, Donald Barr for The New York Times said that it "laughingly arrays the Seven Deadly Sins and the cardinal virtues in the guise of a medieval saint's legend." In his 1973 assessment, Richard Ollard called this story "enchantingly funny." King considered it to stand out from his other stories "like a glorious speckled trout in a goldfish pond."

=== "A Passage of the Frontier" ===
A fugitive escapes on foot south across the Pyrenees from a military threat emanating the north (the Nazis during World War II in Tolstoy's reading). He eventually reaches the safety of a shepherd's hut, and is asked if he is the Christ. On being told he is not, the shepherd replies that in that case he will not have to kill the lamb.

An "exciting and terrifying" tale according to Ollard's 1973 assessment. Tolstoy considered the story to be a paradigm of the Passion of Christ, "although its cryptic ending leaves one guessing at some of the symbolism."

=== "The Voluntary Patient" ===
Mr Philips, a patient in a mental institution, is most insistent that he is only there on a voluntary basis. The staff viciously tease and make fun of him.

In a 1955 review of the first US publication, William Dunlea in Commonweal called the story "a smart fantasy-satire of auto-suggestive psychotherapy." Donald Barr for The New York Times, also writing in 1955, said that the story "shaking with macabre laughter, shows hell itself under the aspect of a madhouse."

=== "The Long Day Running" ===
Another hunting story, based again upon O'Brian's own experiences with the Ynysfor hunt. The hunter is an outsider, new to the sport, who feels he must appear worthy to the regulars. The author casts himself as the black outsider, Kirk, who teeters on the brink of exhaustion, danger and self-discovery.

In his assessment of 1973, Richard Ollard considered the tale to be notably good in setting the scene and in evoking the emotions kindled by the sport.

=== "On the Bog" ===
Boyle and Meagher have been friends for many years, although with a rather strained relationship. Boyle has always been leader, and is frequently overbearing and insensitive to Meagher's feelings. When Meagher is invited to join Boyle on a wildfowling expedition and is then treated with disdain, his anger at the humiliation gradually rises to such a pitch of rage that he turns his gun on Boyle.

Godfrey Hodgson in The Independent wrote that the author "paces to perfection ... the idea that what the narrator feels for his ostensible friend is in fact murderous hatred."

=== "The Lemon" ===
The narrator has lived a solitary life for some years, long enough "to grow strange". One morning, while reading, he finds his thoughts becoming unmanageable. Trying to puzzle out the cause, he focuses on "a sort of dream" that he had had the night before: the noise from the ground floor restaurant beneath his flat had become intolerable and he had crept downstairs and removed the main fuse in the lobby, plunging the restaurant into darkness; he threw in a small hand grenade, and retreated back upstairs. He recalls that before his unruly thoughts had interrupted his morning reading he had looked out of the window and seen plate glass still heaped in the gutter. Examining his motivations, the narrator concludes that – whether dream or reality – since he did not consciously know where the fuse box was, his mind must be guilty of unconscious criminal intent, and that it must logically follow that he is a psychopath who cannot morally continue to live.

Tolstoy suggests that this story illustrates the author's propensity, at least in his early days, to use his fiction as a "weapon of psychic attack". In her 1951 diary, O'Brian's wife had recorded "an infernal racket" which went on until 6 am, emanating from a restaurant below the flat in Collioure where they lived at the time. Later, she recorded that O'Brian stayed up most of the night writing The Lemon: "In the story he (for I fear the nameless protagonist is he) creeps downstairs ... and hurls a hand grenade ('the lemon') into the darkness." "Ah, if only ..."

=== "The Last Pool" ===
A fisherman spends the day fishing the waters of an Irish mountain stream. He has little success, and continually tells himself as he moves up the rapids that "this is the last pool". When he reaches the final pool at the head of the cascades a magnificent salmon takes the fly, and after a long struggle the fisherman slips into the dark racing water while attempting to land it. Returning to consciousness, he hears people around him quietly discussing where a priest is to be found.

=== "The Handmaiden" ===
Edward and Paula are expatriates living in Spain. Paula is unable to have a child, and the couple agree that they will ask their poor but attractive Spanish maid, Conchita, whether she would be prepared to bear Edward a child for them. As Paula walks back from the maid's home after putting the question to her family, she has a view from afar into her own garden, and there she sees the girl being amorously chased through the bushes by an unseen man. Incandescent with rage at Edward's apparent deceit, her mind fills with tales she has heard of duplicity within marriage. But as she arrives back, she sees a youth slip out of the garden: it is he not Edward who has been pursuing Conchita.

=== "On the Wolfsberg" ===
An unnamed woman finds herself walking along a road through the mountains. Realising that she does not know who she is, why she is there, nor where she is going, she keeps steadily on, feeling only a bruising around her heart. She sees a sheet of paper on the road, which she hopes will not be symbolic: it contains incomprehensible diagrams, perhaps for solving a puzzle. Then she is joined by a large wolf that follows her at a distance; she hopes again that the wolf is not symbolic. Picking up a stone, she flings it at the animal, suddenly realising who she is and that Hugh Lupus was an empty selfish man, false through and through.

In his 1973 assessment Richard Ollard noted this story as being "disquieting and faintly eerie."

== Publication ==
The back cover of the book included a quotation from A. S. Byatt listing a number of authors to whom she returned regularly for "cheer or consolation". The inclusion of Georgette Heyer in the list offended O'Brian, who considered the book "utterly ruined" by the comparison.

== Literary significance and criticism ==
Reviews of the 1994 collection were respectful, in line with O'Brian's reputation. Writing in The Independent, Godfrey Hodgson called the quality "unmistakeable", and speculated that the tales may have been overlooked when first published because readers "cannot bear too much reality." Jane Shilling in The Sunday Telegraph was impressed, too, with the author's "perfect cadences" and his precise, fluent, economical prose.

== Bibliography ==
- King, Dean (2000). Patrick O'Brian: A Life Revealed. London: Hodder and Stoughton. ISBN 0-340-792558.
- Tolstoy, Nikolai (2004). Patrick O'Brian: The Making of the Novelist. London: Century. ISBN 0-7126-7025-4.
- Tolstoy, Nikolai (2019). Patrick O'Brian: A Very Private Life. London: William Collins. ISBN 978-0-00-835058-1.
