= Lady Isobel Gathorne-Hardy =

British royal courtier and early pioneer of women's ice hockey

Lady Isobel Gathorne-Hardy DCVO
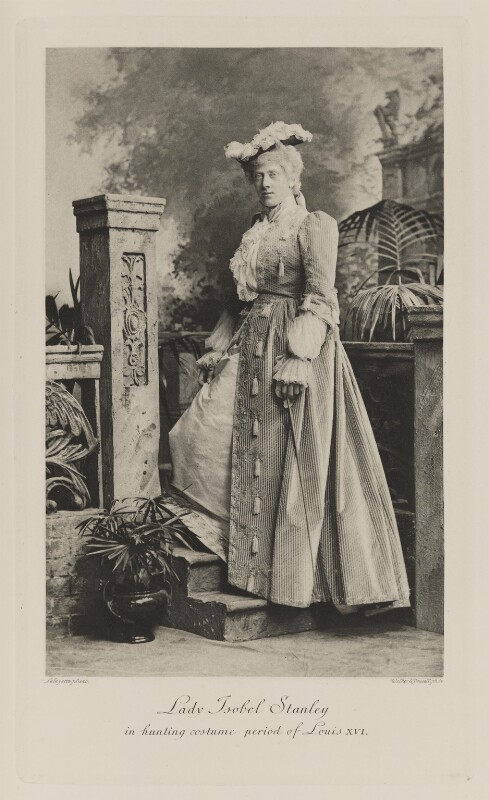
- Lady Isobel Gathorne-Hardy (1897)
- Other titles: Dame Commander of the Royal Victorian Order
- Born: Isobel Constance Mary Stanley; 2 September 1875; Marylebone, London
- Died: 30 December 1963 (aged 88); London, England
- Noble family: Stanley
- Spouse: Francis Gathorne-Hardy
- Issue: Elizabeth Constance Mary Gathorne-Hardy
- Father: Frederick Stanley, 16th Earl of Derby
- Mother: Constance Villiers

Lady Isobel Constance Mary Gathorne-Hardy DCVO (née Stanley; 2 September 1875 – 30 December 1963) was a British courtier, best known for helping to popularize ice hockey in the early days of the sport in Canada. The daughter of Frederick Stanley, 16th Earl of Derby, Governor General of Canada, and Lady Constance Villiers, she was one of the earliest European women known to have played the sport. She is celebrated as an early pioneer of women's ice hockey and the championship trophy of the Premier Hockey Federation (PHF) was named the Isobel Cup in her honour.

== Personal life ==
Lady Isobel Stanley was the second-youngest of ten children born to Frederick Stanley, 16th Earl of Derby and Constance Villiers. Two of her siblings died before Isobel was born: Geoffrey, Arthur's twin, died on 16 March 1871 and her elder sister, Katherine Mary, died young in October of the same year. Isobel Stanley grew up in an active environment with her seven brothers.

In 1897, she married General Sir (John) Francis Gathorne-Hardy, a younger son of John Gathorne-Hardy, 2nd Earl of Cranbrook and Cicely Ridgway. She retained her title upon marriage as the daughter of an earl and took on the family name of her husband, being styled Lady Gathorne-Hardy. They had one child, a daughter named Elizabeth Constance Mary Gathorne-Hardy (1904–1953).

Lady Gathorne-Hardy served in the Royal Household as a Woman of the Bedchamber to Queen Mary during 1914 to 1920. In 1945, King George VI appointed her Dame Commander of the Royal Victorian Order for her service to the royal family.

== Ice hockey ==
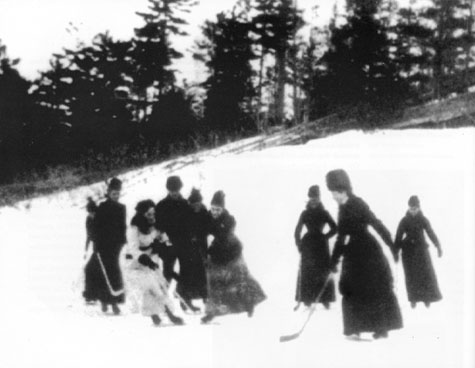
Isobel Stanley wearing an ankle-length white dress at Rideau Hall on the Rideau Hall rink, Ottawa, circa 1890. Earliest known photograph of women playing ice hockey rather than bandy.

Stanley shared her father's and brothers' love of the game of ice hockey and was instrumental in convincing her father to create the Stanley Cup. Stanley played hockey while she was in Canada, playing on the outdoor rink at Rideau Hall. After the opening of the Rideau Skating Rink, she organized one of the first games of women's hockey on record in 1890.

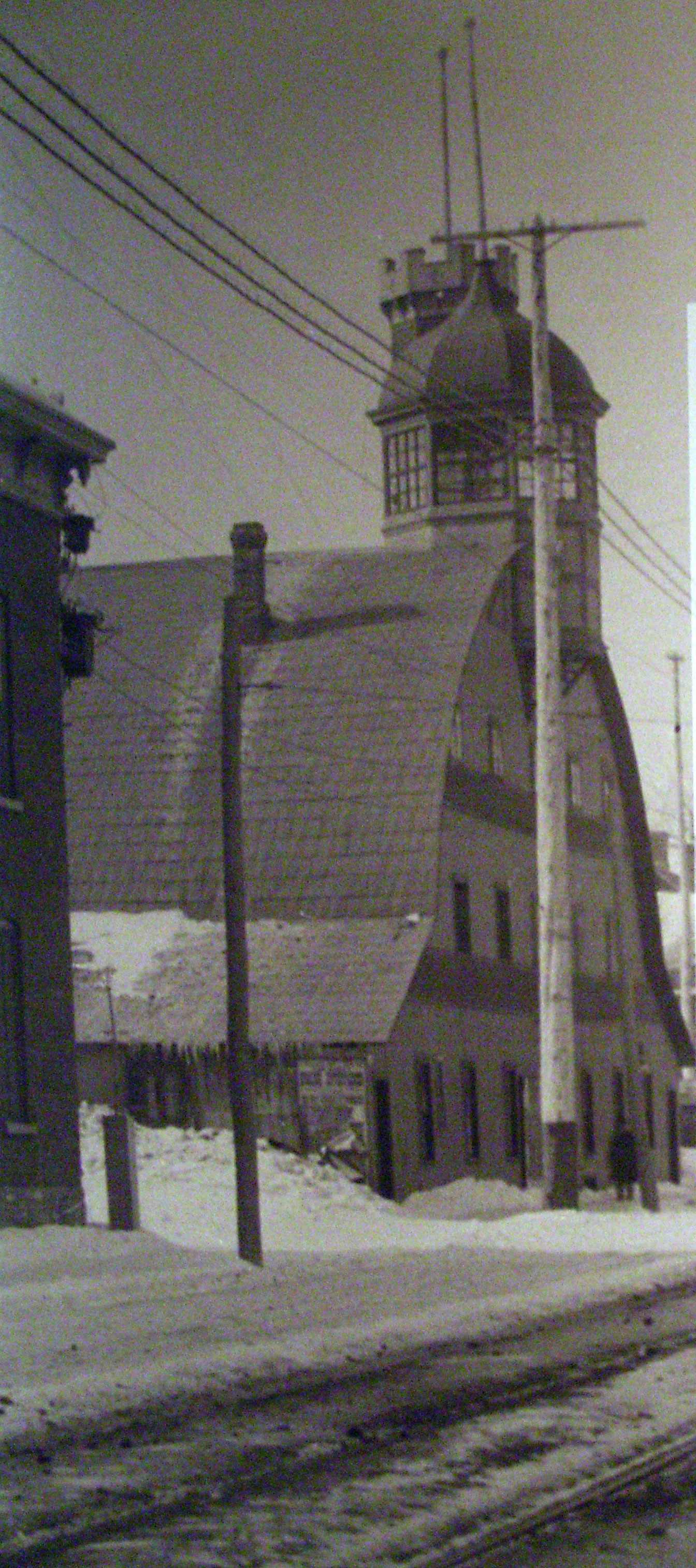
1904 photo of Rideau Rink in Ottawa

=== Isobel Gathorne-Hardy Award ===
Lady Isobel Stanley Gathorne-Hardy's role as a pioneer of women's ice hockey in Canada is acknowledged with the Isobel Gathorne-Hardy Award. The award is presented by Hockey Canada to an active player (at any level) whose values, leadership and personal traits are representative of all female athletes.

Year	Winner	Province
2000	Linda Irving	Prince Edward Island
2001	Julie Foster	Saskatchewan
2002	Andria Hunter	Ontario
2003	Tanya Leone	British Columbia
2004	Jane Legacé	Alberta
2005	Cathy Phillips	Ontario
2006	Melanie McFarlane	Ontario
2007	Karen Mamchuk	Manitoba
2008	No award	
2009	Charla Currie	Prince Edward Island
2011	Nancy MacMillan	Prince Edward Island
2010	No award	
2012	Jordan Krause	British Columbia
2013	Caroline Ouellette	Québec
2014	Lisa-Marie Breton	Québec
2015	Mallory Deluce	Ontario
2016	Toni Ross	Saskatchewan
2017	Natasha Esquivel	Manitoba
2018	MacKenna Parker	Saskatchewan
2019	Maggie Connors	Newfoundland and Labrador
2020	Ève Gascon	Québec
2021	Marie-Philip Poulin	Québec
2022	Mélodie Daoust	Québec
2023	Emmy Fecteau	Québec

Updated January 7, 2024

=== Isobel Cup ===
The championship trophy of the Premier Hockey Federation was named the Isobel Cup in her honor.

Year	Winner	MVP
2016	Boston Pride	Brianna Decker
2017	Buffalo Beauts	Brianne McLaughlin
2018	Metropolitan Riveters	Alexa Gruschow
2019	Minnesota Whitecaps	Lee Stecklein
2021	Boston Pride	Jillian Dempsey
2022	Boston Pride	Taylor Wenczkowski
2023	Toronto Six	Michela Cava
