= The Last Pool and Other Stories =

1950 short story collection by Patrick O'Brian

- Author: Patrick O'Brian
- Language: English
- Genre: Short stories
- Published: London
- Publisher: Secker and Warburg
- Publication date: 1950
- Media type: Print
- Pages: 216

The Last Pool and Other Stories is a 1950 collection of short stories by the English author Patrick O'Brian. It was his first published book under that name (though he had published several works as a teenager under his birth name Patrick Russ). The thirteen stories are largely about rural experiences, focusing on hunting, shooting and fishing. Published by Secker and Warburg, the collection included several stories that would later be republished in The Walker and other stories. The collection was both a critical and financial success for O'Brian.

== Contents ==
The collection includes the following stories:

1. "The Last Pool"
2. "The Green creature"
3. "The Return"
4. "The Happy despatch"
5. "The Virtuous Peleg"
6. "The Drawing of the Curranwood badgers"
7. "It must have been a branch, they said"
8. "The Steep slope of Gally y Wenallt"
9. "The Long Day Running"
10. "Name Calls"
11. "The Dawn flighting"
12. "The Trap"
13. "The Little Death"

== Themes and style ==
The writer and critic Steve Bodio described the stories as "some straight forward," and "some supernatural" and "uncanny" in the tradition of tales by T.H. White from the 1930s and Geoffrey Household from the 1950s. He noted that some have a "touch of terror."

The book was published when O'Brian's English birth was not well known, and some reviewers focused on the "Irish" elements within the stories. In his book Sportsman's Library, Stephen Bodio described the book as capturing something Irish in its "uncanny atmosphere". And an Observer reviewer wrote "This Charming book by an Irish sportsman is a genuine collection of tales of the Irish countryside."

== Reception and success ==
Reviews of the collection were generally favourable. Both The Irish Times and the Irish novelist and playwright Lord Dunsany in The Observer gave positive reviews. The Western Morning News described the stories as taking "their tense drama in hunting, fishing and shooting, and their realism in the author's intimate knowledge." The reviewer particularly liked the story "The Trap" that had "rare poetical qualities" and that "exhibits a fine sense of period and of the mind of a dolish poacher". Bodio described the collection as containing "some of the best fishing and hunting writing I have seen".

Sales of the collection gave O'Brian more confidence in his writing, and he earned £30 beyond the advance from his publisher Secker and Warburg. According to his one of his biographers, Dean King, O'Brian used the advance to pay for hot water and electricity for the flat that he was living in with his wife.

== See also ==
- Collected Short Stories (O'Brian book)
