= Jonathan Gathorne-Hardy =

British author (1933–2019)

- Born: 17 May 1933; Edinburgh, Midlothian, Scotland
- Died: 16 July 2019 (aged 86); Aldeburgh, Suffolk, England
- Education: Trinity College, Cambridge
- Occupation: Author
- Spouse: Sabrina Tennant
- Children: 2
- Relatives: Gathorne-Hardy family

Jonathan Gathorne-Hardy (17 May 1933 – 16 July 2019) was a British author, known for biographies, including one of Alfred Kinsey, and books of social history on the British nanny and public school system. For his autobiography, Half an Arch, he received the J. R. Ackerley Prize for Autobiography in 2005. He also wrote novels and children's literature. He subsequently worked in advertising and publishing.

Born in Edinburgh, he was raised in London, and educated at Port Regis School, Bryanston School and Trinity College, Cambridge, where he received a major scholarship to read history. As a boy, he was one of Benjamin Britten's favourites and he and his family provided the names for the characters in The Little Sweep. His involvement with Britten is described in John Bridcut's Britten's Children.

His grandfather was Gathorne Gathorne-Hardy, 3rd Earl of Cranbrook. His father was Surgeon-Commander the Honourable Antony Gathorne Gathorne-Hardy, the fourth child of the third Earl. His mother was Ruth Elizabeth Thorowgood. Edward Gathorne-Hardy and Robert Gathorne-Hardy were his uncles, and his aunt was Lady Anne Hill, wife of George Heywood Hill, who together founded the Heywood Hill bookshop in Mayfair. His cousin, born just a month after him, was the zoologist Gathorne Gathorne-Hardy, 5th Earl of Cranbrook, who attended Cambridge at the same time as he did.

He died at his home in Aldeburgh on 16 July 2019 at the age of 86.

== Works ==
- Jane's Adventures in and out of the Book (1966)
- Chameleon (1967)
- The Office (1970)
- Jane's Adventures on the Island of Peeg (1972)
- The Rise and Fall of the British Nanny (1972, reissued 1993) as The Unnatural History of the Nanny (USA)
- Jane's Adventures in a Balloon (1975)
- The Airship Ladyship Adventure (1975)
- The Public School Phenomenon, 597–1977 (1977), as Old School Tie – Phenomenon of English Public School (USA)
- The Terrible Kidnapping of Cyril Bonhamy (1980)
- Cyril Bonhamy v. Madam Big (1981)
- Love, Sex, Marriage and Divorce (1981)
- Cyril Bonhamy and the Great Drain Robbery (1983)
- Doctors: the Lives and Work of GPs (1984) (non-fiction)
- The Centre of the Universe is 18 Baedekerstrasse (1985)
- Cyril Bonhamy and Operation Ping (1985)
- The City Beneath The Skin (1986)
- Cyril of the Apes (1987)
- The Munros' New House (1987)
- The Interior Castle: A Life of Gerald Brenan (1994)
- The Twin Detectives (1995)
- Particle Theory. A Novel (1996)
- A Bookseller's War: Heywood and Anne Hill (1997) (letters, editor)
- Alfred C. Kinsey. Sex the Measure of All Things: A Biography (1998)
- Half An Arch (2004) (autobiography)
