= Golden PEN Award =

- Awarded for: "A Lifetime's Distinguished Service to Literature"
- Country: England
- Hosted by: English PEN
- First award: 1993
- Final award: Active
- Website: Golden Pen Award

The Golden PEN Award is a literary award established in 1993 by English PEN given annually to a British writer for "a Lifetime's Distinguished Service to Literature". The winner is chosen by the Board of English PEN. The award has previously been called the S.T. Dupont Golden Pen Award.

The award is one of many PEN awards sponsored by International PEN affiliates in over 145 PEN centres around the world.

== Recipients ==
Golden PEN Award winners
Year	Recipient	Ref.
1993	Sybille Bedford	
1994	V. S. Pritchett	
1995	Stephen Spender	
1996	William Cooper	
1997	Iris Murdoch	
1998	Muriel Spark	
1999	Penelope Fitzgerald	
2000	Francis King	
2001	Harold Pinter	
2002	Doris Lessing	
2003	Michael Frayn	
2004	Nina Bawden	
2005	Jan Morris	
2006	Michael Holroyd	
2007	Josephine Pullein-Thompson	
2008	JG Ballard	
2009	John Berger	
2010	Salman Rushdie	
2011	Margaret Drabble	
2012	Linton Kwesi Johnson	
2013	Gillian Slovo	
