= Samuel Kilderbee =

English churchman and lawyer (1725–1813)

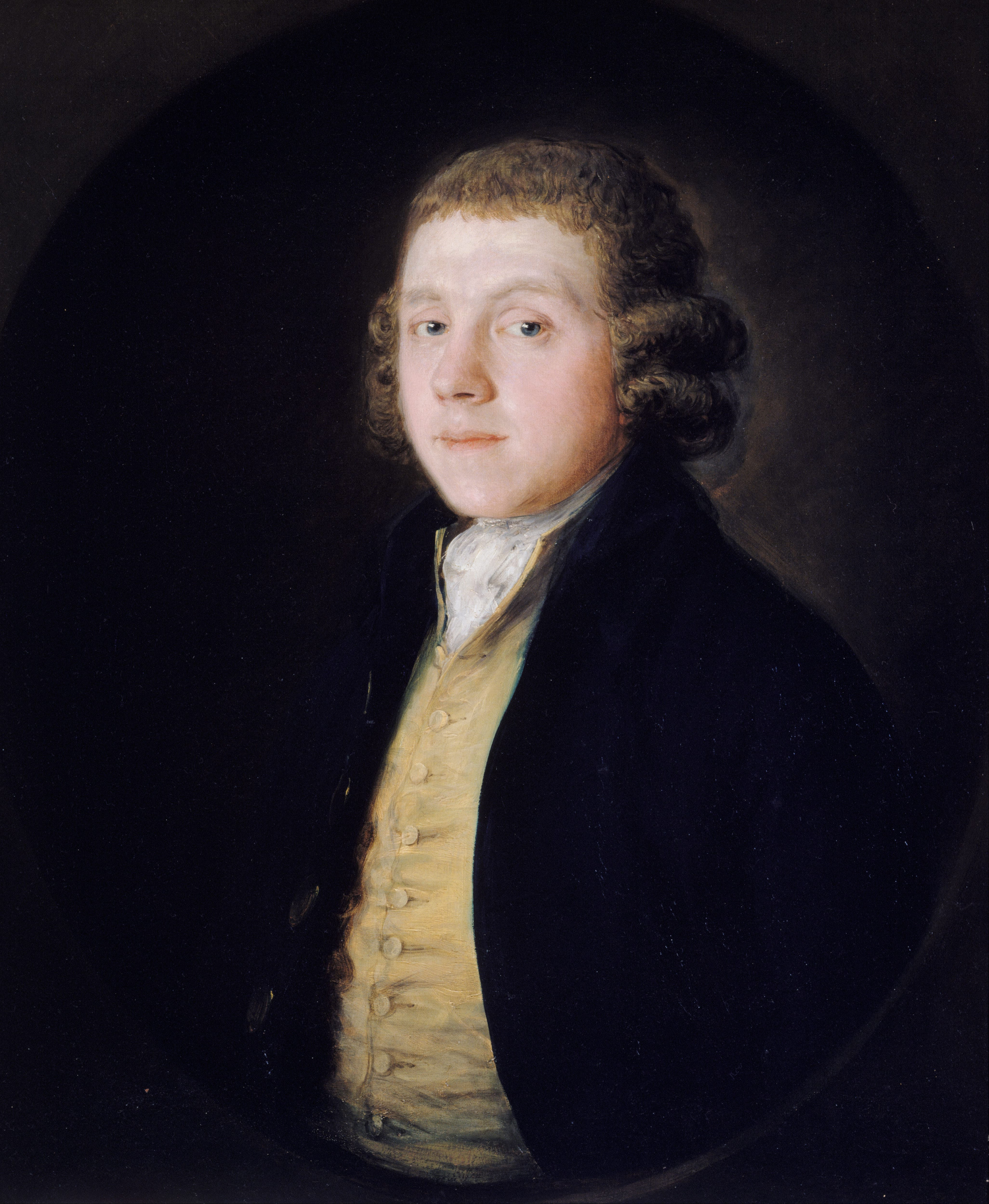
Thomas Gainsborough, The Reverend Samuel Kilderbee.

The Reverend Samuel Kilderbee (1725 – 1813) was an English churchman, lawyer, and town clerk. He was also a lifelong friend of Thomas Gainsborough.

== Biography ==
Born 1725, Kilderbee had a successful career as an attorney, in particular representing Nathaniel Acton in many legal transactions. In 1755, during the period of political turmoil in Ipswich, he was installed as Town Clerk, a position he retained until 1767. It is unclear if the Gainsboroughs had known the Kilderbees before Gainsborough's move to Ipswich after his London training, but it is certainly possible. The Kilderbee family had been living for several generations in Framlingham, while Gainsborough was from Sudbury, on the other side of Ipswich. Once they did meet, they became firm friends until the end, although, as with much of Gainsborough's life, direct evidence is scanty.

Gainsborough's family visited the Kilderbees from London in the 1770s, and Gainsborough and Kilderbee made a tour of the Lake District in 1783. Gainsborough made Kilderbee 'overseer' of the execution of his will and Kilderbee visited Gainsborough on his death-bed, where he reported that Gainsborough, "regretted the dissolute life he had led, but added, 'They must take me altogether, liberal, thoughtless, and dissipated.'" William Jackson said that Gainsborough's letters to Kilderbee were 'brilliant but eccentric, and too licentious to be published', and indeed they never were.

Kilderbee's wife Mary was the daughter of a landowner Daniel Wayth merchant of 'Glemham Magna'. Samuel and Mary inherited Wayth's estate in Great Glemham in 1787 including the site of the current Glemham House and Park. There may have been several earlier houses on the site but a substantial house in the style of the late 16th Century or early 17th Century existed in 1733 when it belonged to Wayth. The location of the mansion house at that time is unclear but the former stables and a dovecot of C18 date survive to the south west of the present house which might indicate a possible location. They had one son, Rev. Samuel Kilderbee. He died in 1813, aged 87 or 88.

Kilderbee Jr. demolished the old house and constructed the present Glemham House and its park from 1814 to approximately 1823. The house is a Regency Mansion built to the designs of Thomas Hopper set in a Reptonian landscape.

== See also ==
- Philip Thicknesse
- Spencer Horsey de Horsey
