= Philippa Pullar =

Philippa Pullar (12 February 1935, in London – 7 September 1997 in London) was a British author and jet set personality best remembered for her exhaustively researched 1975 biography of the Irish-American author Frank Harris. The biography involved great amounts of traveling and research, not least because Harris had intricately woven fact and fiction in his famous five-volume autobiography, My Life and Loves.

Born Philippa King, she was daughter of an army major. She married Robert Pullar in 1958 and they had two sons. The marriage did not last and was dissolved before he died in 1996.

In later years Pullar became known as a devotee of New Age thought and prior to her death from cancer advocated various methods of natural and alternative healing.

Pullar had an extraordinary relationship with Michael Holroyd (before he married author Margaret Drabble), which Holroyd described in his memoir Mosaic, published after her death.

== Books ==
- Consuming Passions: A History of English Food and Appetite. Dedicated "to Michael with my love" (1970)
- Frank Harris (1975)
- Gilded Butterflies: The Rise and Fall of the London Season (1978)
- The Shortest Journey (1984) ISBN 0-04-291018-8
- (with Lilla Bek) To the Light (1985)
- Spiritual and Lay Healing (1988)
- (with Lilla Bek) Healing with Chakra Energy: Restoring the Natural Harmony of the Body (1994)
