= Caroline Gathorne-Hardy, Countess of Cranbrook =

English food campaigner

Caroline Gathorne-Hardy, Countess of Cranbrook OBE (née Jarvis; 18 December 1935), is an English aristocrat and campaigner on food quality issues. She is the widow of Gathorne Gathorne-Hardy, 5th Earl of Cranbrook, and mother of the 6th Earl.

She was born in London in 1935, the daughter of Colonel Ralph George Edward Jarvis of Doddington Hall, Lincolnshire, and his wife, Antonia Mary Hilda Meade. Both of her parents were in MI6, and she moved to Portugal as a girl.

She married the Earl of Cranbrook on 9 May 1967, and took up the married name Caroline Gathorne-Hardy. Their early home was in a jungle area of Malaya, where her husband worked as a zoologist. After three years, they took up residence at his family seat, Great Glemham House, Great Glemham, Saxmundham, Suffolk. She ran the estate farm and raised their three children. When her husband inherited the Cranbrook earldom from his father, on 22 November 1978, she became a countess.

She was made an Officer of the Order of the British Empire (OBE) in the 2006 Birthday Honours, for services to the red meat industry in the East of England, after campaigning to save local abattoirs. She is president of the Aldeburgh Food and Drink Festival.

Lady Cranbrook appeared as a castaway on the BBC Radio programme Desert Island Discs on 31 May 2009, selecting Bach's "O Haupt voll Blut" from the St Matthew Passion (performed by the Cologne Cathedral Choir, Dresden Chamber Choir, and Cologne Chamber Orchestra, conducted by Helmut Muller-Bruhl), Food in England by Dorothy Hartley, and a pen and ink as her chosen favourite record, book and luxury item respectively. She received The Oldie's 'Campaigner of the Year' Award in 2010. The then Prince of Wales called her "the doughtiest fighter for good sense in agriculture".

She and her husband have three children:

- John Jason Gathorne-Hardy, 6th Earl of Cranbrook (born 26 October 1968), born in Kuala Lumpur
- Dr. Lady Flora Gathorne-Hardy (born 10 October 1971)
- Hon. Argus Edward Gathorne-Hardy (born 28 May 1973)
