= Gathorne Gathorne-Hardy, 3rd Earl of Cranbrook =

British peer

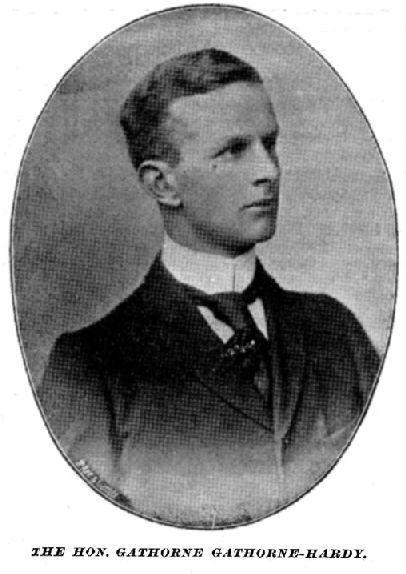
The Hon. Gathorne Gathorne-Hardy, c. 1895, New Zealand

Gathorne Gathorne-Hardy, 3rd Earl of Cranbrook (18 December 1870 – 23 December 1915), styled as Lord Medway between 1906 and 1911, was a British hereditary peer.

== Early life ==
Cranbrook was born in 1870, the son of Conservative politician John Stewart Gathorne-Hardy, 2nd Earl of Cranbrook and his wife Cicely Marguerite Wilhelmina Ridgway. His aunt was Margaret Goschen, Viscountess Goschen.

== Career ==
Cranbrook served as a captain in the 2nd Volunteer Battalion, The Buffs, and was a Deputy Lieutenant (DL) and Justice of the Peace (JP) for Kent.

He succeeded his father in the earldom in 1911, having previously been styled as Lord Medway.

== Marriage and children ==
Cranbrook married Lady Dorothy Montagu Boyle (1879–1968), daughter of the David Boyle, 7th Earl of Glasgow, Governor-General of New Zealand, on 25 April 1899 at Holy Trinity, Sloane Street. With his wife, Cranbrook had five children:

- John David Gathorne-Hardy, 4th Earl of Cranbrook (15 April 1900 – 22 November 1978), father of Gathorne Gathorne-Hardy, 5th Earl of Cranbrook.
- Hon. Ralph Edward Gathorne-Hardy (4 Jun 1901 – 18 June 1978)
- Hon. Robert Gathorne-Hardy (31 July 1902 – 11 February 1973)
- Cdr. Hon Antony Gathorne Gathorne-Hardy (13 July 1907 – 1976), father of Jonathan Gathorne-Hardy.
- Lady Anne Catherine Dorothy Gathorne-Hardy (12 October 1911 – 22 October 2006), who married George Heywood Hill.

== Death ==
Lord Cranbrook died during the First World War, on 23 December 1915 at the age of 45. He was succeeded in the earldom by his son John.
