= Gathorne's shrew =

Conservation status
- Data Deficient (IUCN 3.1)

Scientific classification
- Kingdom: Animalia
- Phylum: Chordata
- Class: Mammalia
- Order: Eulipotyphla
- Family: Soricidae
- Genus: Crocidura
- Species: C. gathornei

Binomial name
- Crocidura gathornei Jenkins, 2013

Species of mammal

Gathorne's shrew or Gathorne's white-toothed shrew (Crocidura gathornei) is a species of mammal in the family Soricidae. It is endemic to northern India.

== Taxonomy ==
Although specimens of this species were collected as far back as 1913, this species was first described over a century later, in 2013. It is named in honor of British zoologist Gathorne Gathorne-Hardy, 5th Earl of Cranbrook.

== Distribution and habitat ==
It is known only from the Western Himalayas of India, at three localities in Uttarakhand and Himachal Pradesh, at 2,743–3,353 metres (9,000–11,000 ft) above sea level. It inhabits open ground with grasses, balsams, and rhododendron, belonging to the Western Himalayan alpine shrub and meadows ecoregion. At other localities, it inhabits the Western Himalayan broadleaf forests ecoregion, but bordering on alpine shrubland.

== Status ==
Nothing is known about threats to this species, and it has been classified as Data Deficient by the IUCN Red List. No villages or cultivation are known from the vicinity of its type locality.
