= Lytton Strachey: A Critical Biography =

Biography of Lytton Strachey by Michael Holroyd

- Author: Michael Holroyd
- Language: English
- Subject: Biography
- Published: 1967 (Heinemann)
- Publication place: United Kingdom
- OCLC: 456067
- Dewey Decimal: 828/.9/1209 B
- LC Class: PR6037.T73 Z69 1967

Lytton Strachey: A Critical Biography is a 1967–68 two-volume biography of Lytton Strachey by Michael Holroyd, often seen as the author's magnum opus. He published a revised version in 1994 with a revised subtitle, The New Biography.

== Publication ==
Robert Lescher, vice president of Holt, Rinehart & Winston, contracted English biographer Michael Holroyd around 1961 to write a biography of Lytton Strachey. Over the next six years, it became a two-volume release. Lescher helped Holroyd secure grant funding for his work from the Saxton and Bollingen Foundations. By the time the book was published, Lescher had left the position to become a literary agent. Lytton Strachey's brother, James, gave Holroyd permission to use previously unpublished work.

The Strachey biography's first of two volumes, The Unknown Years 1880–1910, was released in 1967. The second volume, The Years of Achievement 1910–1932, arrived the next year. He revisited the work by popular request and in 1971 released two revised volumes for Penguin Press: Lytton Strachey: A Biography and Lytton Strachey and the Bloomsbury Group. After writing on Augustus John and Bernard Shaw, in 1994, Holroyd again revised the biography into a single volume, Lytton Strachey: The New Biography. The last release addressed new findings in the quarter-century since the first release, and the previously private information of Strachey's friends became publishable as they died. Lytton Strachey's brother, James, who had given Holroyd permission to use previously unpublished work, originally disagreed with some of Holroyd's passages in the first release, and Holroyd gave him reprieve by publishing the brother's disagreements as footnotes in the text. James died before the first release was published, and the footnotes were removed from the later edition. The 1994 edition also truncated his commentary on Strachey's work, including shorter treatments of each individual book and a new overview of Strachey's Eminent Victorians where there had previously been chapter analyses.

== Reception ==
The biography's initial reception was positive, with particular praise for how Holroyd navigated Strachey's personal life.

== Legacy ==
Though Holroyd would write other biographies, his two-volume release on Strachey became the biographer's magnum opus. Holroyd's biography, Hilton Kramer wrote, "radically altered" common understandings of the Bloomsbury Group and modern English culture. The long-yet-engrossing story made the vast prior library on the Bloomsbury group obsolete; such were its revelations. Still, Kramer retrospectively criticised its ornate and wordy prose, and considered Holroyd's mid-1970s Augustus John biography to be of a higher writing quality.
