= Lady Anne Hill =

British bookseller and writer

Lady Anne Catherine Dorothy Hill (née Gathorne-Hardy; 12 October 1911 – 22 October 2006) was a British bookseller and writer.

== Life ==
Lady Anne was born on 12 October 1911 in Methven, Perthshire, the daughter of Gathorne Gathorne-Hardy, 3rd Earl of Cranbrook and Lady Dorothy Montagu Boyle.

In 1936, she started working with George Heywood Hill, and together they launched Heywood Hill, which still operates as an independent bookshop in the central London district of Mayfair. In 1938, the pair married; he was a cousin of her sister-in-law Fidelity Cranbrook (née Seebohm, second wife of the fourth Earl). She had previously been engaged to James Lees-Milne, an expert in English country houses, and they remained on good terms.

The Hills lived in Warwick Avenue, Maida Vale, and later in Richmond. They had two daughters.

She died in 2006 in Darsham, Suffolk.

== Works ==
She researched her family tree and became intrigued by Captain Edward Trelawny, a friend of the poets Byron and Shelley. She published Trelawny's Strange Relations in 1956. Her account of running the bookshop while her husband was away at war appeared in print as A Bookseller's War (1997), mainly composed of letters between the couple.

== Family ==
Her brothers were John, 4th Earl of Cranbrook, booksellers Edward and Robert, and Anthony, whose son was the writer Jonathan Gathorne-Hardy.
