= Michael Holroyd =

English writer and biographer (born 1935)

Sir Michael Holroyd CBE, FRSL
- Born: Michael de Courcy Fraser Holroyd; 27 August 1935 (age 91); London, England
- Education: Eton College
- Occupations: Writer and biographer
- Notable work: Lytton Strachey: A Critical Biography
- Spouse: Margaret Drabble
- Awards: Golden PEN Award; David Cohen British Literature Prize; James Tait Black Memorial Prize

Sir Michael de Courcy Fraser Holroyd (born 27 August 1935) is an English biographer.

== Early life and education ==
Holroyd was born in London, the son of Basil de Courcy Fraser Holroyd (a descendant of Sir George Sowley Holroyd, Justice of the King's Bench, whose ancestor was Isaac Holroyd, younger brother of George, the great-great-grandfather of John Baker Holroyd, 1st Earl of Sheffield), and his wife, Ulla (known as "Sue"), daughter of Karl Knutsson-Hall, a Swedish army officer. Holroyd's parents having separated– their son "left to grow up in a bewilderingly extended family, shunted back and forth among parents and stepparents and grandparents and uncles and aunts"- Holroyd was raised at his father's family home, Norhurst, at Maidenhead, Berkshire. The Holroyds "for a time enjoyed a small fortune", provided by, among other things, an Indian tea plantation; this fortune was eventually "done in by mismanagement of resources and foolish investments" including investment in Lalique glassware, his grandfather having been its sole London agent in the 1920s. The Holroyd family had been "for several centuries" Yorkshire "butchers, clergymen, clothiers, farmers, landowners, soldiers, yeoman [sic] of all kinds".

Holroyd was educated at Eton College, though he has often claimed Maidenhead Public Library as his alma mater.

== Career ==
In 1964, Holroyd published his first book, a biography of the writer Hugh Kingsmill; his reputation was consolidated in 1967–68 with the publication of his two-volume life of Lytton Strachey (which the playwright Christopher Hampton later used extensively when writing the screenplay for the 1995 film Carrington). Holroyd has also written biographies of Augustus John and, in four volumes, of Bernard Shaw. His book A Book of Secrets: Illegitimate Daughters, Absent Fathers (2010) concerns the Villa Cimbrone on the Gulf of Salerno and the Edwardian literary and society figures who lived there, such as Ernest Beckett, 2nd Baron Grimthorpe.

Lytton Strachey: A Critical Biography (1967, 1968) became Holroyd's definitive work. He published a revised version in 1994 under the revised subtitle The New Biography.

Holroyd was chairman of the Society of Authors, 1973–83, and from 1985 to 1988 was president of the English branch of PEN. He is also President of the Shaw Society.

His awards include the 2001 Heywood Hill Literary Prize and the 2005 David Cohen Prize for literature. In 2006, he was awarded the Golden PEN Award by English PEN for "a Lifetime's Distinguished Service to Literature". He was president of the Royal Society of Literature from 2003 to 2008, and was knighted in the 2007 New Year Honours List. Holroyd is a patron of Dignity in Dying.

== Personal life ==
Holroyd is married to the author Margaret Drabble.

== Awards ==
- 1968—Fellow of the Royal Society of Literature
- 1968—Yorkshire Post Book Award (Book of the Year): Lytton Strachey: A Critical Biography
- 1988—Irish Life Arts Award
- 1989—Commander of the Order of the British Empire
- 1995—Prix du Meilleur Livre Etranger (France)
- 2001—Heywood Hill Literary Prize
- 2003—Golden PEN Award
- 2005—David Cohen British Literature Prize
- 2007—Knighted for services to English literature
- 2008—James Tait Black Memorial Prize
- 2010—Lifetime Services to Biography Award

== Bibliography ==
- Hugh Kingsmill : a critical biography. Unicorn Press. 1964.
- Lytton Strachey: A Critical Biography, volume 1: The Unknown Years (1880-1910), Heinemann, 1967
- Lytton Strachey: A Critical Biography, volume 2: The Years of Achievement (1910-1932), Heinemann, 1968
- A Dog's Life, Henry Holt (US only), 1969
- The Best of Hugh Kingsmill: Selections from his Writings (editor), Gollancz, 1970
- Lytton Strachey by Himself: A Self-Portrait (editor), Heinemann, 1971
- Unreceived Opinions, Heinemann, 1973
- Augustus John: A Biography, volume 1: The Years of Innocence, Heinemann, 1974
- The Art of Augustus John (with Malcolm Easton), Secker & Warburg, 1974
- Augustus John: A Biography, volume 2: The Years of Experience, Heinemann, 1975
- The Genius of Shaw: A Symposium (editor), Hodder & Stoughton, 1979
- The Shorter Strachey (editor with Paul Levy), Oxford University Press, 1980
- William Gerhardie: God's Fifth Column: A Biography of the Age: 1890–1940 (editor with Robert Skidelsky), Hodder & Stoughton, 1981
- Essays by Divers Hands, (editor), Boydell Press, 1982
- Peterley Harvest: The Private Diary of David Peterley (introduction), Secker & Warburg, 1985
- Bernard Shaw, volume 1: 1856–1898: The Search for Love, Chatto & Windus, 1988
- Bernard Shaw, volume 2: 1898–1918: The Pursuit of Power, Chatto & Windus, 1989
- Bernard Shaw, volume 3: 1918–1950: The Lure of Fantasy, Chatto & Windus, 1991
- Bernard Shaw, volume 4: 1950–1991: The Last Laugh, Chatto & Windus, 1992
- The Shaw Companion, Chatto & Windus, 1992
- Lytton Strachey: The New Biography, Chatto & Windus, 1994
- Augustus John: The New Biography, Chatto & Windus, 1996
- Bernard Shaw (one-volume revised edition), Chatto & Windus, 1997
- Basil Street Blues: a Memoir, Little, Brown, 1999
- The Whispering Gallery: Leaves from a Diplomat's Diary by Hesketh Pearson, (introduction), Phoenix Press, 2000
- Works on Paper: The Craft of Biography and Autobiography, Little, Brown, 2002
- Swedish Reflections: From Beowulf to Bergman (preface), Arcadia Books, 2003
- Mosaic. Portraits in Fragments, Little, Brown, 2004
- A Strange Eventful History: The Dramatic Lives of Ellen Terry, Henry Irving and their Remarkable Families, Chatto & Windus, 2008
- A Book of Secrets: Illegitimate Daughters, Absent Fathers, Chatto & Windus, 2010
- On Wheels, Chatto & Windus, 2012
- The Good Bohemian: The Letters of Ida John (editor with Rebecca John), Bloomsbury, 2017
- Ancestors in the Attic: My Great-Grandmother's Book of Ferns [&] My Aunt's Book of Silent Actors, Pimpernel Press, 2017
- Facts and Fiction: A Book of Storytelling, Bloomsbury, 2018

Critical studies and reviews of Holroyd's work

- Britain, Ian (June 2011). "Grand follies". Australian Book Review (332): 67–68. Reviews A book of secrets.

== See also ==
- James Strachey
- Philippa Pullar
