= Gathorne Gathorne-Hardy, 5th Earl of Cranbrook =

British zoologist (1933–2026)

The Right Honourable The Earl of Cranbrook OStJ FIBiol FRGS FZS FLS
- Arms of the Earl of Cranbrook

Member of the House of Lords
- Lord Temporal
- In office 22 November 1978 – 11 November 1999 as a hereditary peer
- Preceded by: The 4th Earl of Cranbrook
- Succeeded by: Seat abolished (Note: Pursuant to the House of Lords Act 1999.)

Personal details
- Born: Gathorne Gathorne-Hardy; 20 June 1933 St George Hanover Square, London, England
- Died: 24 August 2026 (aged 93)
- Spouse: Caroline Jarvis (m. 1967)
- Children: 3, including Jason Gathorne-Hardy, 6th Earl of Cranbrook
- Parents: John Gathorne-Hardy, 4th Earl of Cranbrook (father); Fidelity Seebohm (mother)
- Relatives: see Gathorne-Hardy family
- Education: Eton College; Corpus Christi College, Cambridge (MA); Birmingham University (PhD)
- Occupation: Zoologist; naturalist; Hereditary peer

Gathorne Gathorne-Hardy, 5th Earl of Cranbrook (20 June 1933 – 24 August 2026), styled Lord Medway until 1978, was a British zoologist, biologist, naturalist and peer. From 1956 to his death in 2026, he was active in the fields of ornithology, mammalogy, and zooarchaeology, and influenced research and education in Southeast Asia. His career focus was on swiftlets and other small Southeast Asian birds, as well as on mammals, including orangutans.

Cranbrook was the author of Wild Mammals of South-East Asia (1986), Wonders of nature in South-East Asia (1997) and Swiftlets of Borneo: Builders of Edible Nests (2002) and Key Environments: Malaysia (2013), which had a foreword from Prince Philip, Duke of Edinburgh.

== Early life and career ==
Cranbrook was born in London, the eldest child of John Gathorne-Hardy, 4th Earl of Cranbrook, an archaeologist and also a zoologist, and his second wife, Fidelity Seebohm, daughter of Hugh Exton Seebohm and sister of Lord Seebohm. He was educated at Eton College and Corpus Christi College, Cambridge. Cranbrook attended Cambridge at the same time as his cousin, the writer and biographer Jonathan Gathorne-Hardy. He earned his PhD in 1960 from the University of Birmingham.

A tropical biologist, Cranbrook worked in Malaya, beginning his career as an assistant at Sarawak Museum, Sarawak. He was a senior lecturer in zoology between 1961 and 1970 at University of Malaya, Kuala Lumpur, and a Jajason Siswa Lokantara Fellow between 1960 and 1961 at Indonesia. After many years working in the far-east, he returned with his wife Caroline Cranbrook and young family to take up residence at his family seat, Glemham House, Great Glemham, near Saxmundham, Suffolk.

He succeeded as Earl of Cranbrook upon his father's death in 1978, and sat as a Conservative peer in the House of Lords. He left the Lords in November 1999 as a result of the House of Lords Act 1999; he was not a candidate to retain a place in the House as an elected hereditary peer.

Cranbrook was awarded the Royal Geographical Founders Gold Medal and the WWF Duke of Edinburgh Conservation Award in recognition of his work in UK and Tropical Nature Conservation and Research. He was created Panglima Negara Bintang Sarawak (Knight Commander of the Most Exalted Order of the Star of Sarawak) and received the Merdeka Award recognising his outstanding contribution to the people of Malaysia.

A species of white-toothed shrew, Gathorne's shrew (Crocidura gathornei), is named in his honor.

== Marriage and issue ==
On 9 May 1967, he married Caroline Jarvis, daughter of Col. Ralph Jarvis and his wife Antonia née Meade, a scion of the Earl of Clanwilliam. Cranbrook and his wife had three children:

- John Jason Gathorne-Hardy, 6th Earl of Cranbrook (born 26 October 1968), born in Kuala Lumpur.
- Lady Flora Gathorne-Hardy (born 10 October 1971).
- Hon. Argus Edward Gathorne-Hardy (born 28 May 1973), heir presumptive to his brother.

== Death ==
Gathorne-Hardy died on 24 August 2026, aged 93.

== Notes ==
Peerage of the United Kingdom
| Preceded by John Gathorne-Hardy | Earl of Cranbrook; 1978–2026; Member of the House of Lords (1978–1999) | Succeeded by John Gathorne-Hardy |
| Preceded by John Gathorne-Hardy | Viscount Cranbrook; 1978–2026 | Succeeded by John Gathorne-Hardy |
