= Gathorne Gathorne-Hardy, 1st Earl of Cranbrook =

British statesman and Conservative politician (1814–1906)

The Right Honourable The Earl of Cranbrook GCSI PC
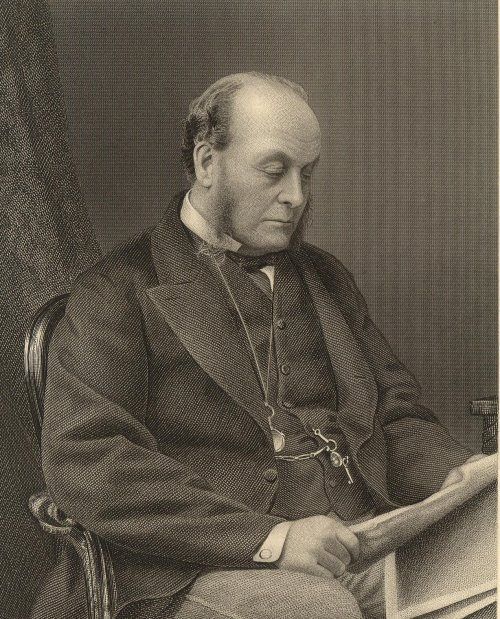
- Portrait by W. & D. Downey, 1880

Home Secretary
- In office 17 May 1867 – 3 December 1868
- Monarch: Queen Victoria
- Prime Minister: The Earl of Derby; Benjamin Disraeli
- Preceded by: Spencer Horatio Walpole
- Succeeded by: Henry Bruce

Lord President of the Council
- In office 24 June 1885 – 6 February 1886
- Monarch: Queen Victoria
- Prime Minister: The Marquess of Salisbury
- Preceded by: The Lord Carlingford
- Succeeded by: The Earl Spencer
- In office 3 August 1886 – 18 August 1892
- Monarch: Queen Victoria
- Prime Minister: The Marquess of Salisbury
- Preceded by: The Earl Spencer
- Succeeded by: The Earl of Kimberley

Chancellor of the Duchy of Lancaster
- In office 3 – 16 August 1886
- Monarch: Queen Victoria
- Prime Minister: The Marquess of Salisbury
- Preceded by: Sir Ughtred Kay-Shuttleworth, Bt
- Succeeded by: Lord John Manners

Personal details
- Born: Gathorne Hardy; 1 October 1814 Bradford, Yorkshire, England
- Died: 30 October 1906 (aged 92) Benenden, Kent, England
- Party: Conservative
- Spouse: Jane Stewart Orr (m. 1838)
- Children: 5, including: Margaret Goschen, Viscountess Goschen; John Gathorne-Hardy, 2nd Earl of Cranbrook; Alfred Gathorne-Hardy
- Parent(s): John Hardy; Isabel Gathorne
- Relatives: Gathorne-Hardy family
- Education: Oriel College, Oxford

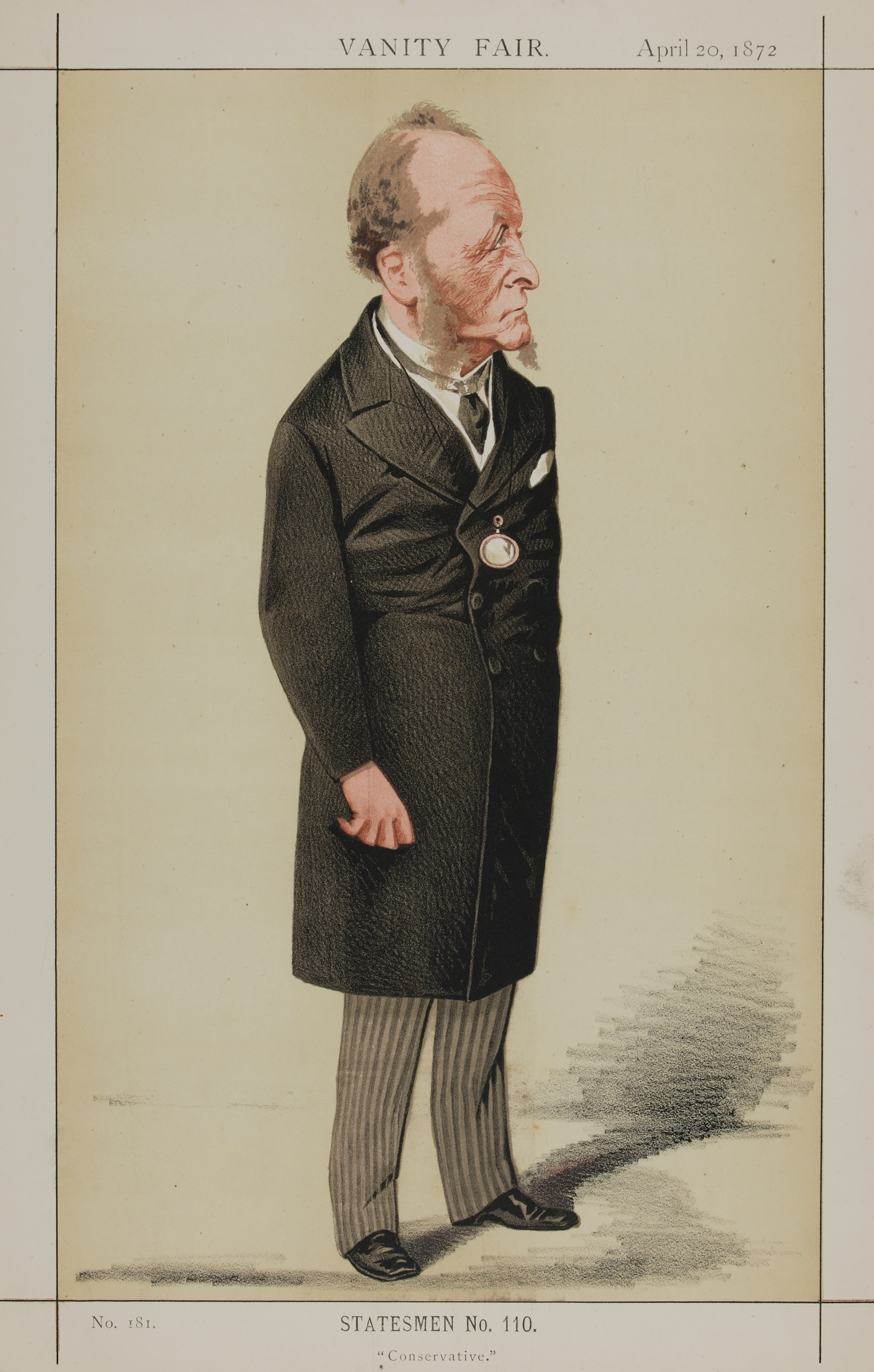
"Conservative". Caricature by Adriano Cecioni published in Vanity Fair in 1872

Gathorne Gathorne-Hardy, 1st Earl of Cranbrook, GCSI, PC (1 October 1814 – 30 October 1906) was a prominent British Conservative politician. He held cabinet office in every Conservative government between 1858 and 1892.

Hardy served as Home Secretary from 1867 to 1868, Secretary of State for War from 1874 to 1878, Secretary of State for India from 1878 to 1880, Lord President of the Council from 1885 to 1886 and again from 1886 to 1892, and Chancellor of the Duchy of Lancaster in 1886. In 1878, he was elevated to the peerage as Viscount Cranbrook and in 1892 he was granted an earldom. He has been described as a moderate, middle-of-the-road Anglican, and a key ally of Disraeli.

== Background and education ==
Gathorne Hardy was the third son of John Hardy and Isabel Gathorne, daughter of Richard Gathorne, of Kirkby Lonsdale, Cumbria. His older brother was Sir John Hardy, 1st Baronet. His father was a barrister and businessman, the main owner of the Low Moor ironworks and also represented Bradford in Parliament as a Conservative. His immediate ancestors had been attorneys and stewards to the Spencer-Stanhope family of Horsforth since the beginning of the 18th century.

He was educated at Shrewsbury School and Oriel College, Oxford, and was called to the Bar, Inner Temple, in 1840. He established a successful legal practice on the Northern Circuit, being based in Leeds, but was denied when he applied for silk in 1855.

== Early political career, 1847–1874 ==
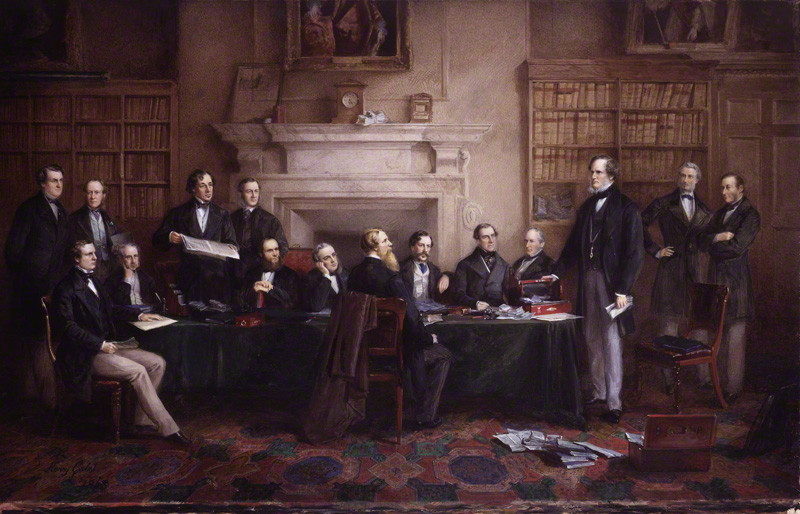
The Derby cabinet of 1867.

Gathorne Hardy had unsuccessfully contested Bradford in the 1847 general election. However, after his father's death in 1855 he was able to concentrate fully on a political career, and in 1856 he was elected for Leominster. Only two years later, in 1858, he was appointed Under-Secretary of State for Home Affairs in the second administration of the Earl of Derby. He remained in this office until the government fell in June 1859.

In 1865, Gathorne Hardy reluctantly agreed to stand against William Ewart Gladstone in the Oxford University constituency. However, on 17 July 1865, he defeated Gladstone by a majority of 180, which greatly enhanced his standing within the Conservative party thanks to the influence of rural clergy voters, but still did not come first in the poll. Gladstone's response was "Dear Dream is dispelled. God's will be done". The Conservatives returned to office under Derby in 1866, and Hardy was appointed President of the Poor Law Board, with a seat in the cabinet. He was admitted to the Privy Council at the same time. During his tenure in this office he notably carried the Poor Law Amendment Act 1867 through Parliament. Cranbrook also supported the Reform Act 1867, which significantly increased the size of the electorate to one in five. By May, Disraeli had recognised Gathorne Hardy's value to the Conservatives as a rising star in the Commons, proving a capable debater, a resilient antagonist to Gladstone, and "nobody's fool". In 1867 he succeeded Spencer Horatio Walpole as Home Secretary and was forced to deal with the Fenian Rising of that year. By accepting an amendment that all ratepayers should be enfranchised, Disraeli had created a new Victorian constitution, which surprisingly Hardy and others were prepared to accept. One new entrant in 1868, an admirer of Disraeli, the Radical, Sir Charles Dilke thought Hardy the most eloquent Englishman, whose talents were wasted in the Conservative Party. But Hardy himself, not so easily deceived, remained a stalwart Tory to the end. (Note: Jenkins (Dilke, p.64) analysed Dilke's remarks as the best High Victorian orators being Leon Gambetta, Castelar, John Bright, W E Gladstone, Lord Derby, Gathorne Hardy, and Father Felix.)

The next year, Benjamin Disraeli succeeded Derby as Prime Minister, but the Conservative government resigned in autumn 1868, after both the Queen and Disraeli delayed dissolution to register a new electorate, which since 1865 had accepted postal votes. The Liberals came to power under Gladstone. In opposition, Hardy occasionally acted as opposition leader in the House of Commons when Disraeli was absent.

There was criticism of the Anglican Church in Ireland, which Liberals intended to disestablish in its entirety. A committed Anglican, Hardy opposed the measure on religious grounds:

"I say that the Church of Ireland has made many converts; not, it may be, by violent controversial proceedings, but by a quiet influence which has affected the minds of those who have been around her clergy, and who have gradually become leavened by their sentiments".

Being an orthodox Anglican he considered fragmentation of the church as contrariwise to Conservative principles.

"I have faith in the principles we are professing, and when I am told by the right hon. Gentleman the President of the Board of Trade, and by others who have spoken like him, that all thoughtful men are against the Irish Church, that for fifty years every Statesman has looked forward to some such consummation."

He spoke manfully in the Irish Church bill debate on 23 March 1869, before Gladstone gave the government's winding-up in one of the greatest oratorical expositions during the second reading. Hardy linked the Irish church bill to the Fenian rising and resulting atrocities, vis-à-vis a Catholic church allegedly willing to sell benefices for money. Moreover, he directly attacked the Prime Minister's followers whom he accused of being "indebted to the Fenian movement for that tardy measure of justice. This shows the encouragement to disloyalty given by this measure." And in provoking the government he linked tendentiously Baron Plunket, the nationalist, to the Liberal Party: which no doubt they disowned.

During debates on education Hardy produced eloquent and stinging rebukes that deflected time from Gladstone's Irish reform agenda. Hardy proved an able lieutenant in the Disraelian tradition, mocking Gladstone's bill's cumbersome progress through the Commons. Gladstone gradually became hotter and bothered by Cranbrook's adroit remarks. When he was likened to the Hyde Park riots of 1866, the Prime Minister "caused such an explosion of passion and temper."

The defeat threatened Disraeli's party leadership, but despite being considered Hardy declined, whilst the great man was still 'looking over his shoulder'. On 1 February 1872, Hardy was present at the Burghley House Conference of Tory grandees: only Derby and Disraeli were missing for the discussion about the party's and country's future. Hosted by Lord Exeter, a Cecil descendant of the Elizabethan Lord Burghley, other Cabinet members were Sir Stafford Northcote, Sir John Pakington, Lord Cairns, and Lord John Manners, a personal friend of Disraeli. Only Manners and Northcote were prepared to support Disraeli's continued leadership. The group suggested that Lord Stanley, Derby's son, take the Commons post of party leader. For his part, the younger Stanley was a very different character than his father. Short and plump, Stanley was a reformer, open to change, and ideas around progressive politics. He was also more amenable to Disraeli, recognizing that he was unfit, he did not wish to displace a man whom backbenchers knew was the outstanding parliamentarian. Stanley's neutrality would convert other cabinet members towards acceptance of the flamboyant Jew. Latterly, Hardy worked well with Disraeli, although they were not close intimates. At the end of the month the mood in London lifted: the Prince of Wales was out of trouble, and Hardy amongst others attended a service of thanksgiving and praise at St Paul's on 27 February.

== Cabinet minister, 1874–1880 ==
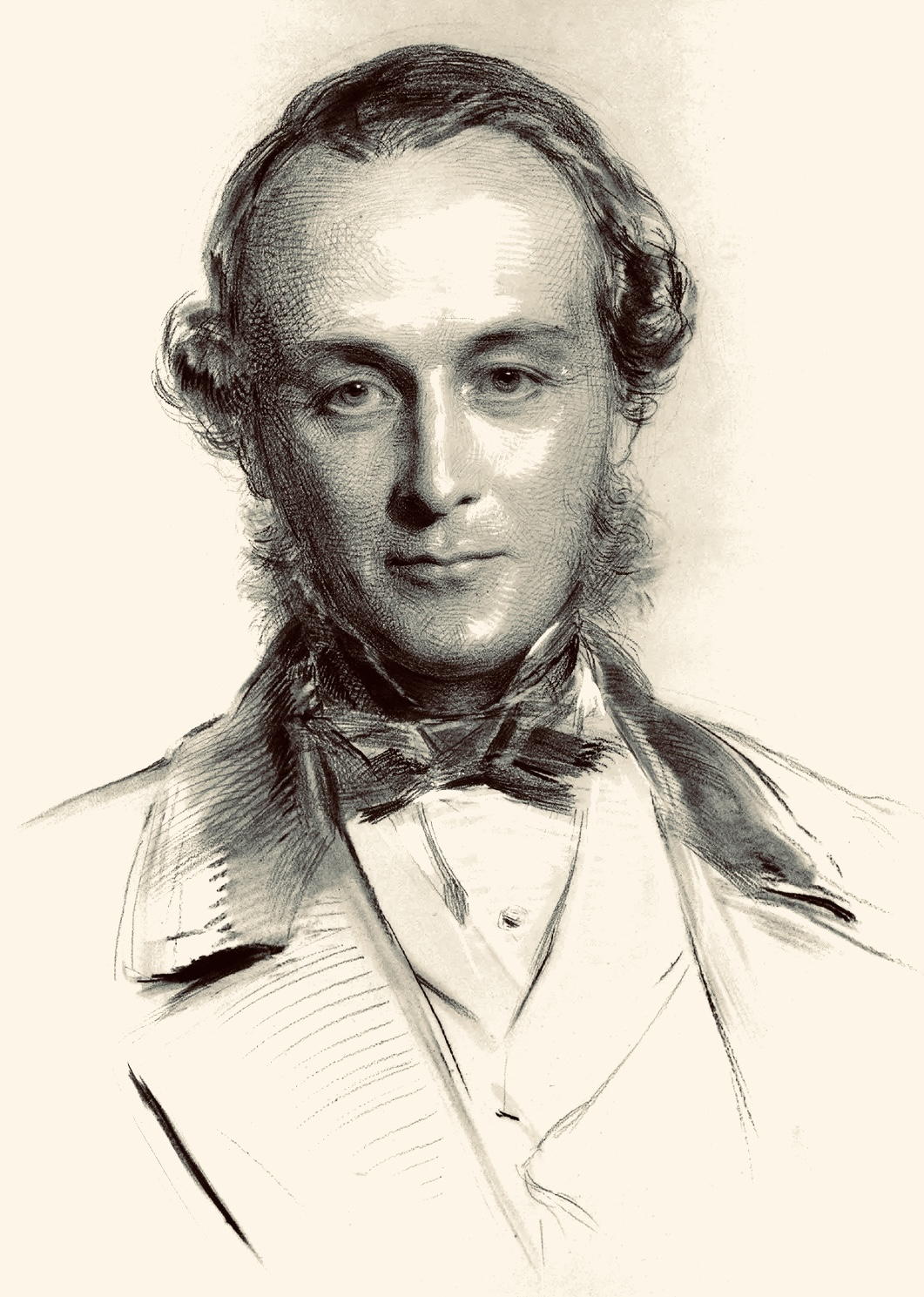
Portrait of Gathorne Hardy by George Richmond, 1857

In 1874, the Conservatives returned to office under Disraeli, and Hardy was appointed Secretary of State for War, for which he was not best suited. He should have been offered the Home Office, but this went to a fine debater, Richard Cross. But the House rose on 7 August, leaving the minister the remainder of the year to settle into departmental work. Hardy stayed in post for more than four years overseeing the army reforms initiated by his Liberal predecessor Edward Cardwell. In 1876, Disraeli was elevated to the peerage, and the House of Lords, as Earl of Beaconsfield. Hardy had expected to become Conservative leader in the House of Commons, but was overlooked in favour of Sir Stafford Northcote; Disraeli disliked the fact Hardy neglected the house to go home in the evening to dine with his wife.

Two years later, in April 1878, Hardy succeeded The Marquess of Salisbury as Secretary of State for India, and the following month he was raised to the peerage as Viscount Cranbrook, of Hemsted in the County of Kent. At the same time, he assumed by royal license his mother's maiden surname of Gathorne in addition to that of Hardy. In December 1878, Cranbrook attended court, and heard from the Queen her complaints about Gladstone's mishandling of the Prince of Wales' rejection of the proposal to make him Viceroy of Ireland. Cranbrook remained one of the ministers at the centre of the court being a monarchist, frequently interacting with the Queen and Prince of Wales; indeed, Cranbrook "won the full confidence and warm personal regard of Queen Victoria". When Gladstone's portrait was shown in public, Cranbrook tactfully observed protocol.

The Eastern Question had posed the biggest single foreign policy dilemma in 1877. Hardy was in favour of actively pursuing the bankrupted Sultan with a loan, and going to war if necessary to keep Russia out of Constantinople. He proved one of Disraeli's closest allies in cabinet. Cranbrook was a relative parvenu; the rich aristocrats wanted peace and so did Gladstone, at any price. But he was vindicated; when Salisbury swapped sides to support the PM, he was raised to Foreign Minister. A 'War Party', an Inner Cabinet, sent Royal Navy battleships to defend the Turks against a threatening Russian Army. At the India Office Cranbrook was forced to deal with the Second Afghan War in 1878, aimed at restoring British influence in Afghanistan. After a peaceful summer of 1878 deer-stalking in Scotland, Cranbrook returned to a crisis dealing with an ill-prepared Viceroy of India. A full invasion of Afghanistan was ordered on 21 November. The Afghans were defeated within weeks, but the new Third Empire had begun in a state of panic. A peace deal was struck in May 1879, but war again erupted after the British resident, Sir Louis Cavagnari, was murdered by mutinous Afghan troops. British troops under Frederick Roberts managed once again to restore control. However, the situation was still volatile when Cranbrook, along with the rest of the government, resigned in April 1880. As a peer Cranbrook was disqualified from making speeches during elections, which ended in a Liberal majority. He took a well-earned rest in Italy early in 1881, and was still there when the only one of Disraeli's cabinet absent for the Earl of Beaconsfield's funeral at Hughenden.

== Tory grandee ==
Arms of the Earl of Cranbrook

Lord Cranbrook remained at the heart of the party elite. In 1884 a new Chief Whip, Aretas Akers-Douglas gained promotion from Salisbury partly through the austere influence of this knowledgeable and experienced grandee. In early 1885 the government was rent with division, Chamberlain refusing to agree with the franchise as 'ransom' of private property. Cranbrook wrote to Lord Cairns on 9 January, "all this comes from the Irish policy for wh. Mr Gladstone is responsible." The writing was on the wall for the government. In June 1885 the Conservatives returned to power as "Caretakers", and Cranbrook was made Lord President of the Council. Cranbrook was shocked to find out that behind the cabinet's back Lord Carnarvon had been negotiating a deal, known in the newspapers as 'Tory Parnellism', with the Irish Party.

For two weeks in early 1886 he again served as Secretary of State for War. The government fell in January 1886 but soon returned to office in July of the same year after a general election under a new franchise. Cranbrook was once again appointed Lord President of the council, in which office he was mainly concerned with education. He also served briefly as Chancellor of the Duchy of Lancaster in August 1886. He declined the post of Foreign Secretary in 1886 owing to his inability to speak foreign languages, and also refused the viceroyalty of Ireland. Perhaps the stolid familiarity of the council was additionally welcome after the turmoil in government caused by Lord Randolph Churchill's erratic, argumentative behaviour. He remained as Lord President of the council until the second Salisbury ministry fell in 1892. Shortly after, he was further honoured when he was made Baron Medway, of Hemsted in the County of Kent, and Earl of Cranbrook, in the County of Kent. In opposition, Cranbrook was a strong opponent of the Second Home Rule Bill, which was heavily defeated in the House of Lords. He retired from public life after the 1895 general election. He settled down as a country squire at his Hemsted Park estate, and served as a Justice of the peace for Kent and Yorkshire, and also as a Deputy lieutenant.

== Marriage and family ==
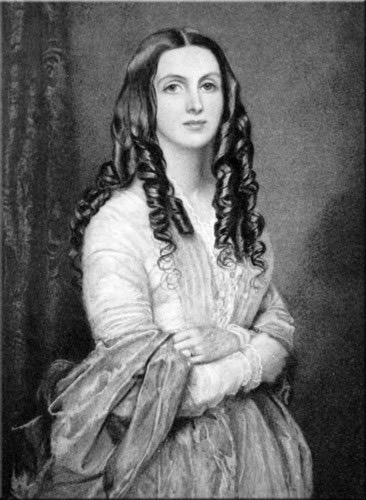
The Countess of Cranbrook, c. 1835–45

In 1838, Cranbrook married Jane Stewart Orr (1813–1897), the daughter of James Orr, of Hollywood House, County Down, and Jane Stewart. They had four sons and five daughters:

- John Stewart Gathorne-Hardy, 2nd Earl of Cranbrook (22 March 1839 – 13 July 1911), who married Cicely Ridgway, and had seven children.
- Col. Hon. Charles Gathorne Gathorne-Hardy (11 May 1841 – 17 February 1919)
- Hon. Alfred Erskine Gathorne-Hardy (27 February 1845 – 11 November 1918), a Conservative Member of Parliament and writer.
- Jane Isabel Hardy (died 21 June 1862)
- Edith Elizabeth Hardy (died 8 January 1875), who married Henry Graham.
- Lady Emily Blanche Gathorne-Hardy (1848 – 20 December 1912)
- Hon. Harold Gathorne-Hardy (24 March 1850 – 11 June 1881)
- Lady Mary Katharine Gathorne-Hardy (1852 – 11 May 1911)
- Lady Margaret Evelyn Gathorne-Hardy (4 July 1858 – 11 July 1943), who married George Goschen, 2nd Viscount Goschen, and had three children.

One son and two of their daughters predeceased them.

He owned 5,188 acres, in Kent and Sussex but the vast majority of these in Kent.

== Death and legacy ==
Lord Cranbrook died in October 1906 aged 92 at his residence Hemsted Park, near Benenden, Kent. He was succeeded in the Earldom of Cranbrook by his eldest son John. His will was proven by probate at over £274,000, equivalent to over £40 million in the present day.

His obituary in The Times stated the following:

"[He] was not quite in the front rank of Victorian statesmen. He was not of the stuff of which Prime Ministers are made ... But he was a very eminent public man of his day, a strong, capable and painstaking Minister ... a tower of strength to his party ... who early won the full confidence and warm personal regard of Queen Victoria."

== Works by Gathorne Hardy ==
- The Afghan War (1878)
- The Past History of Benenden, Hawkhurst (1883)
- Gathorne Hardy, first Earl of Cranbrook: a Memoir with extracts from his diary and correspondence (1910)

== See also ==
- Premierships of Benjamin Disraeli
- Conservative Party
- British India
- Second Afghan War
- Irish Church Act 1869
- Church of Ireland
- Anglicanism

== Notes ==
=== Bibliography ===
- Blake, Robert (1985). The Conservative Party from Peel to Thatcher. Fontana Press. ISBN 0-00-686003-6.
- Chisholm, Hugh, ed. (1911). "Cranbrook, Gathorne Gathorne-Hardy, 1st Earl of" . Encyclopædia Britannica. Vol. 7 (11th ed.). Cambridge University Press. p. 366.
- Gibbs, Vicary; Doubleday, Henry; Cokayne, George C E (1937). Complete Peerage of Great Britain and Ireland. London.
- Hurd, Douglas; Young, Edward (2014). Disraeli Or, Two Lives. Weidenfeld & Nicolson. ISBN 978-0753828328.
- Jenkins, Roy (1998). The Chancellors. Macmillan. ISBN 0-333-73057-7.
- Johnson, Nancy E (1981). The Diary of Gathorne Hardy, later Lord Cranbrook, 1866-1892. Oxford University Press.
- Kidd, Charles; Williamson, David (editors). Debrett's Peerage and Baronetage (1990 ed.). New York.
- Lee, Sidney, ed. (1912). "Gathorne-Hardy, Gathorne" . Dictionary of National Biography (2nd supplement). Vol. 2. London: Smith, Elder & Co.
- Ramsden, John (1998). An Appetite for Power: A History of the Conservative Party since 1830. Harper Collins. ISBN 0-00-638757-8.
- Shannon, Richard (1999). Gladstone: Heroic Minister 1865 1898. Penguin. ISBN 0-14-027593-2.
- Stewart, Robert (1971). Politics of Protection: Lord Derby and the Protectionist Party 1841-1852. Cambridge University Press.
- Vincent, John (1967). Poll Books: How Victorians Voted. Cambridge University Press.

Parliament of the United Kingdom
Preceded by George Arkwright; John George Phillimore	Member of Parliament for Leominster; 1856–1865; With: John George Phillimore 1856–1857; John Pollard Willoughby 1857–1858; Charles Kincaid-Lennox 1858–1865	Succeeded by Arthur Walsh; Richard Arkwright
Preceded by William Ewart Gladstone; Sir William Heathcote, Bt	Member of Parliament for Oxford University; 1865–1878; With: Sir William Heathcote, Bt 1865–1868; John Robert Mowbray 1868–1878	Succeeded by John Robert Mowbray; John Gilbert Talbot
Political offices
Preceded by William Nathaniel Massey	Under-Secretary of State for the Home Department; 1858–1859	Succeeded by George Clive
Preceded by Charles Pelham Villiers	President of the Poor Law Board; 1866–1867	Succeeded by The Earl of Devon
Preceded by Spencer Horatio Walpole	Home Secretary; 1867–1868	Succeeded by Henry Bruce
Preceded by Edward Cardwell	Secretary of State for War; 1874–1878	Succeeded by Frederick Stanley
Preceded by The Marquess of Salisbury	Secretary of State for India; 1878–1880	Succeeded by Marquess of Hartington
Preceded by The Lord Carlingford	Lord President of the Council; 1885–1886	Succeeded by The Earl Spencer
Preceded by William Smith	Secretary of State for War; 1886	Succeeded by Henry Campbell-Bannerman
Preceded by Sir Ughtred Kay-Shuttleworth, Bt	Chancellor of the Duchy of Lancaster; 1886	Succeeded by Lord John Manners
Preceded by The Earl Spencer	Lord President of the Council; 1886–1892	Succeeded by The Earl of Kimberley
Peerage of the United Kingdom
New creation	Earl of Cranbrook; 1892–1906	Succeeded by John Stewart Gathorne-Hardy
New creation	Viscount Cranbrook; 1878–1906	Succeeded by John Stewart Gathorne-Hardy
