= Richard Ollard =

British historian and biographer (1923–2007)

Richard Ollard (9 November 1923 – 21 January 2007) was an English historian and biographer. He is best known for his work on the English Restoration period.

== Life ==
Richard Laurence Ollard was born in Yorkshire on 9 November 1923, the son of Rev Dr S. L. Ollard, an Anglican clergyman. He was educated at Eton College where he was a King's Scholar. He joined the Navy during the Second World War and won an exhibition to New College, Oxford at its conclusion.

For twelve years from 1948 to 1959 Ollard taught history at the Royal Naval College, Greenwich in London. In 1960 he joined the publisher Collins as a senior editor, where he worked until his retirement in 1983. "One might not guess from his otherwise comprehensive obituaries of Penelope Fitzgerald or Carlo Cipolla, or his articles on Fernand Braudel or Patrick O'Brian, Ollard's pioneering role in publishing such authors. That his identification and retention of the best of them was of such a long-term benefit to Collins was largely due to his encouragement of a younger generation of editors who thus maintained continuity."

After his retirement from Collins he continued to research and publish widely and lived in Morecombelake, Dorset. He died of leukaemia on 21 January 2007. Richard was married to Mary (née Riddell) for 53 years & left 3 children & 5 grandchildren.

== Interests and achievements ==
- In 1992 he was awarded the Caird Medal by the Trustees of the National Maritime Museum.
- In 1997 he was joint winner of the Heywood Hill Prize for a lifetime's contribution to the pleasure of reading.
- Fellow of the Royal Society of Literature (FRSL)
- Fellow of the Society of Antiquaries of London (FSA)
- Past Vice President of the Navy Records Society
- An honorary member of the Samuel Pepys Club

== Selected publications ==
- The Escape of Charles II (1966; rep. 1986), which combines historical rigour with a lively account of the period and the immediate aftermath of the Battle of Worcester
- Man of War: Sir Robert Holmes and the Restoration Navy (1969; rep. 2001)
- Pepys: A Biography (1974; rev. 1991)
- This War Without an Enemy: A History of the English Civil Wars (1976)
- The Image of the King: Charles I and Charles II (1979; rep. 2001)
- An English Education: A Perspective of Eton (1982)
- Clarendon and His Friends (1988)
- Clarendon's Four Portraits: George Digby, John Berkeley, Henry Jermyn, Henry Bennet (editor, 1989)
- Fisher and Cunningham: A Study of the Personalities of the Churchill Era (1991)
- Cromwell's Earl (1994), a biography of Edward Montagu, 1st Earl of Sandwich
- Dorset (1995), a 'Pimlico Country History Guide' to the county of Dorset
- A Man of Contradictions: A Life of A. L. Rowse (1999), a biography

The book about A. L. Rowse sparked some controversy in literary circles. A negative review published by the London Review of Books (27 April 2000) prompted this reply by Ollard.

I am sorry that so interesting and well-written an article as Mary Beard's should convey so bitterly one-sided an impression of my book on A.L. Rowse. His encouragement of fellow writers, his practical kindness and hospitality towards them, certainly bulked larger in my mind when I was writing it than the splenetic egocentricity that led him into all too well publicised excesses.

It is humiliating for any author to have failed so signally in what he set out to do. I am reminded of Congreve's witticism that bad portraitists are obliged to write the name of their sitters at the bottom. So may I, likewise, ask LRB readers to accept that my view of Rowse is emphatically not that presented by Mary Beard.

Richard Ollard
