= Francis Gathorne-Hardy =

British Army general (1874–1949)

General The Honourable Sir Francis Gathorne-Hardy GCB GCVO CMG DSO
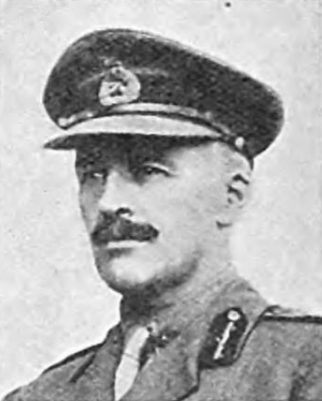
- Born: 14 January 1874
- Died: 21 August 1949 (aged 75)
- Military career
- Allegiance: United Kingdom
- Branch: British Army
- Rank: General
- Units: Second Boer War; Great War; Second World War
- Commands: Northern Command; Aldershot Command
- Awards: Knight Grand Cross of the Order of the Bath; Knight Grand Cross of the Royal Victorian Order; Companion of the Order of St Michael and St George; Distinguished Service Order

General Sir John Francis Gathorne-Hardy, GCB, GCVO, CMG, DSO (14 January 1874 – 21 August 1949) was a British First World War General officer who served in Italy and the Western Front.

== Background and early life ==
Gathorne-Hardy was born in 1874, a younger son of John Gathorne-Hardy, 2nd Earl of Cranbrook, and Cicely Marguerite Wilhelmina Ridgway. He was educated at Eton and the Royal Military College, Sandhurst.

== Military career ==
Gathorne-Hardy joined the British Army as a commissioned second lieutenant in the Grenadier Guards on 10 October 1894, and was promoted to lieutenant on 1 January 1898. In early February 1900 he was seconded for special service in South Africa, where he was involved with Army transport duties during the Second Boer War. He was promoted to captain on 2 May 1900. During later stages of the war he served with the Lovat Scouts, and only left South Africa after the war had ended, in July 1902. For his service in the war he received the brevet rank of major on 22 August 1902. Following his return he was appointed Superintendent of Gymnasia in the Home District in October 1902.

He was promoted from supernumary captain to captain on 22 December 1906, became a brigade major in January 1908 and was promoted to major in October 1909.

In April 1914 he was made a general staff officer, grade 2 at the War Office.

In March 1915, seven months into the First World War, he succeeded Brigadier General Reginald Hoskins as general staff officer, grade 1 (GSO1) of the 7th Division. In January 1918 he was made a Companion of the Order of the Bath (CB).

He was promoted to the substantive rank of major general in June 1919. After commands as a general in Egypt and India, he was in June 1922 appointed director of military training at the War Office, made a lieutenant general on 26 May 1928, and in October placed on half-pay. He was then Commander in Chief at Northern Command from 1931 to 1933 and at Aldershot Command from 1933 to 1937. He had been promoted to general in October 1933. He retired from the army on 12 October 1937.

== Family ==
Gathorne-Hardy married Lady Isobel Constance Mary Stanley, daughter of Frederick Stanley, 16th Earl of Derby and Lady Constance Villiers, on 10 December 1898.

Military offices
Preceded by Sir Cameron Shute	GOC-in-C Northern Command; 1931–1933	Succeeded by Sir Alexander Wardrop
Preceded by Sir Charles Harington	GOC-in-C Aldershot Command; 1933–1937	Succeeded by Sir John Dill
