= John Gathorne-Hardy, 4th Earl of Cranbrook =

British peer and archaeologist

John David Gathorne-Hardy, 4th Earl of Cranbrook CBE KStJ FLS (15 April 1900 – 22 November 1978) was a British hereditary peer and archaeologist.

== Early life and education ==
Cranbrook was the son of Gathorne Gathorne-Hardy, 3rd Earl of Cranbrook and Lady Dorothy Boyle, daughter of David Boyle, 7th Earl of Glasgow. He inherited the earldom in December 1915 at the age of 15 upon the death of his father.

He was educated at Eton and the Royal Military Academy, Woolwich. He was awarded an MA at Cambridge University.

== Career ==
Cranbrook was elected to the office of Parliamentary Private Secretary in 1927 and retained the position until 1928, to the First Commissioner of Works. In addition to this, he was Alderman of the London County Council between 1928 and 1933. He was honorary Air commodore of the No. 3169 Suffolk Fighter Control Unit, Royal Auxiliary Air Force between 1950 and 1961. He was vice-president and a treasurer of the Linnean society in 1958. Cranbrook was also trustee of the British Museum between 1964 and 1973. He died in 1978, aged 78.

== Marriages and children ==
Cranbrook was married on 7 October 1926 to his cousin Bridget D'Oyly Carte, daughter of Rupert D'Oyly Carte and Lady Dorothy Gathorne-Hardy (daughter of John Gathorne-Hardy, 2nd Earl of Cranbrook). They divorced in 1931.

He married again on 26 July 1932 to Fidelity Seebohm, sister of Frederic Seebohm, Baron Seebohm, with whom he had five children:

- Gathorne Gathorne-Hardy, 5th Earl of Cranbrook (20 June 1933 – 24 August 2026);
- Lady Juliet Gathorne-Hardy (born 12 December 1934);
- Lady Catherine Sophia Gathorne-Hardy (born 11 March 1936);
- Lady Christina Gathorne-Hardy (born 1 May 1940), who married the South African surgeon Stanley Edward Letanka in 1967. They have three children, including the jazz pianist Pete Letanka (born 1974), who married Lady Flora Grimston, daughter of John Grimston, 7th Earl of Verulam; and
- Hon Hugh Gathorne-Hardy (born 30 December 1941).

== Death ==
Cranbrook died on 22 November 1978 at the age of 78 and was succeeded in the earldom by his elder son Gathorne. Fidelity, Dowager Countess of Cranbrook died in 2009.

== See also ==
- Earl of Cranbrook
- Gathorne-Hardy family
