= Henry Edwin Fenn =

British journalist

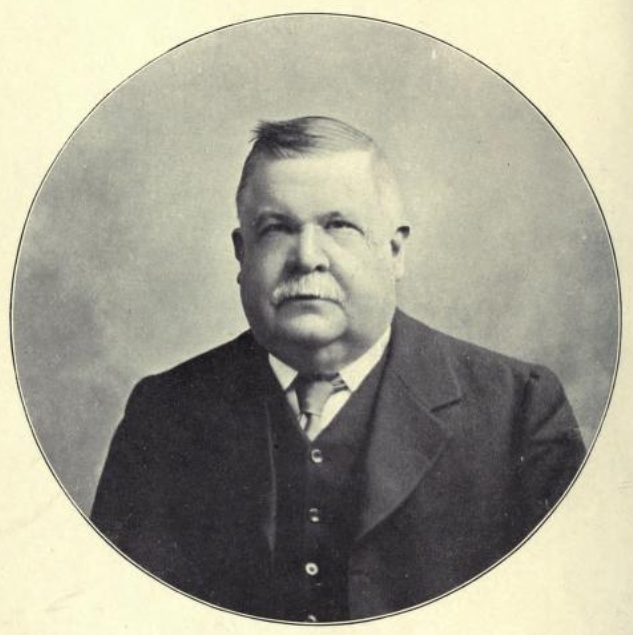
Henry Edwin Fenn

Henry Edwin Fenn (1850–1913) was a British journalist, a fixture in the divorce courts of London, and the author of Thirty-five years in the divorce court (1910).

== Early life ==
Henry Edwin Fenn was born in Camden Town, in the Parish of St. Pancras, London on 25 May 1850 to John Fenn and Mary Ann Fenn.

== Family ==
Fenn married Blanche Julia Crispin at St Mark's Regents Park in the London Parish of St Pancras on 24 October 1874. They had six children of whom one pre-deceased them. In 1911, Fenn was living at 10 Crayford Road, Tufnell Park, with his wife, their daughter Ada Kate Fenn, and son Harold Theodore Fenn.

== Career ==
Fenn spent his career reporting on divorce and probate cases in the London courts, including 30 years with The Daily Telegraph, which culminated in the publication of Thirty-five years in the divorce court in 1910. The book was dedicated "to my dear wife". It combined pen-portraits of leading lawyers at the divorce bar with anecdotes and stories of cases heard and Fenn's observations on human nature, private investigators, and the role of the press in judiciously editing the facts of the more salacious cases in their reporting. The Yorkshire Post noted that 35 years in the courts had made Fenn cynical and led him to the conclusion that money was a greater motivating factor in cases than sentiment. The Daily News (London) felt that Fenn had sacrificed accuracy for readability and that many of his anecdotes were hardly new. They sympathised with Fenn's need to "eke out his scanty material with quotations hardly less trite than some of his anecdotes".

Fenn was a fellow of the Institute of Journalists, a member of The London Press Club, and the senior member of the Council of the Newspaper Press Fund.

== Death ==
Fenn died at his home at Carlton Road, Tufnell Park, London, on 3 November 1913.

== Selected publications ==
- Thirty-five years in the divorce court. T. Werner Laurie, London, 1910.
