= Earl of Cranbrook =

Title in the Peerage of the United Kingdom

Earldom of Cranbrook
- Arms of the Earl of Cranbrook Blazon Arms: Quarterly: 1st & 4th, Argent, on a Bend invected, plain cotised Gules, three Catherine Wheels Or, on a Chief Gules, three Leopard’s Faces Or (Hardy); 2nd & 3rd, Per pale Argent and Or, a Bend compony Azure and Gules, between two Pellets, each within an Annulet Sable (Gathorne). Crests: 1st: a Dexter Arm embowed in armour proper, garnished Or, entwined with a Branch of Oak Vert, charged with two Catherine Wheels Gules, one above and one below the elbow, the hand grasping a Dragon’s Head erased proper (Hardy); 2nd: in front of a Wolf’s Head erased Argent, a Staff raguly fesswise Or (Gathorne). Supporters: On either side a Leopard guardant proper, gorged with a Collar Gules, pendant therefrom an Escutcheon Gules charged with a Catherine Wheel Or.
- Creation date: 22 August 1892
- Created by: Queen Victoria
- Peerage: Peerage of the United Kingdom
- First holder: Gathorne Gathorne-Hardy, 1st Viscount Cranbrook
- Present holder: John Gathorne-Hardy, 6th Earl of Cranbrook
- Heir presumptive: Argus Gathorne-Hardy
- Remainder to: the 1st Earl's heirs male of the body
- Subsidiary titles: Viscount Cranbrook; Baron Medway
- Status: Extant
- Motto: ARMÉ DE FOI HARDI (Armed with hardy faith)

Earl of Cranbrook, in the County of Kent, is a title in the Peerage of the United Kingdom. It was created in 1892 for the Conservative politician Gathorne Gathorne-Hardy, Viscount Cranbrook. The family seat was Hemsted Park, near Benenden, Kent.

== History ==
The first Earl was the son of the wealthy industrialist John Hardy MP and brother of Sir John Hardy, 1st Baronet. He notably held office as Home Secretary, Lord President of the Council, Secretary of State for War and Secretary of State for India. Gathorne-Hardy gained the "warm-personal regard" of Queen Victoria, and had already been created Viscount Cranbrook, of Hemsted in the County of Kent, in 1878, and was made Baron Medway, of Hemsted in the County of Kent, at the same time he was given the earldom. The latter title is used as a courtesy title for the Earl's eldest son and heir apparent.

Lord Cranbrook's eldest son, the second Earl, represented Rye, Mid Kent and Medway in the House of Commons as a Conservative. His son, the third Earl, was gazetted as an officer and private secretary New Zealand.

John Gathorne-Hardy, 4th Earl of Cranbrook (who was previously married to his first cousin Bridget D'Oyly Carte), married Fidelity Seebohm (born 1912), on 26 July 1932 and had five children, including Gathorne Gathorne-Hardy, 5th Earl of Cranbrook.

As of 2026 the titles are held by Jason Gathrone-Hardy, the sixth Earl, who succeeded his father in 2026.

The family seat is Glemham House, near Saxmundham, Suffolk.

=== Notable family members ===
The Hon. Alfred Gathorne-Hardy, third son of the first Earl, sat as a Member of Parliament for Canterbury and East Grinstead. Lady Margaret Gathorne-Hardy, daughter of the first Earl, was the wife of the 2nd Viscount Goschen, a Viceroy of India.

The Hon. Edward Gathorne-Hardy, second son of the third Earl, was a botanist and socialite member of the Bright young things who lived in Athens. He was famously eccentric and rumoured to have been in a relationship with Anthony Eden. Lady Dorothy Gathorne-Hardy, daughter of the third Earl, was the wife of Rupert D'Oyly Carte, owner of the Savoy Hotel. Another member of the family was the writer Jonathan Gathorne-Hardy, a grandson of the third Earl.

== Earls of Cranbrook (1892) ==
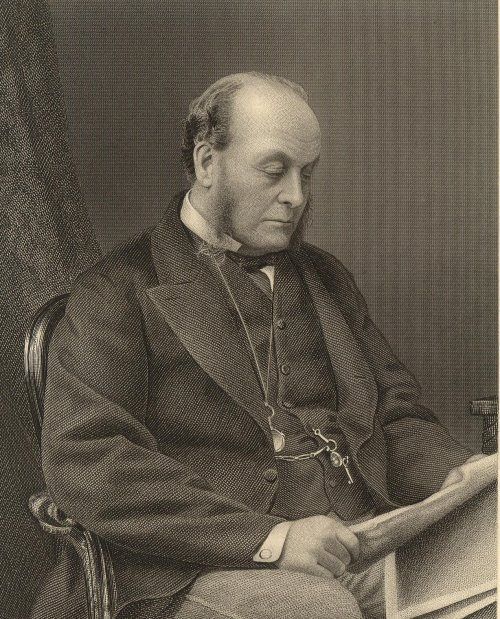
The 1st Earl of Cranbrook

- Gathorne Gathorne-Hardy, 1st Earl of Cranbrook (1814–1906)
- John Stewart Gathorne-Hardy, 2nd Earl of Cranbrook (1839–1911)
- Gathorne Gathorne-Hardy, 3rd Earl of Cranbrook (1870–1915)
- John David Gathorne-Hardy, 4th Earl of Cranbrook (1900–1978)
- Gathorne Gathorne-Hardy, 5th Earl of Cranbrook (1933–2026)
- (John) Jason Gathorne-Hardy, 6th Earl of Cranbrook (born 1968)

The heir presumptive is the present holder's brother Argus Edward Gathorne-Hardy (born 1973).

== Line of succession ==
Line of succession (simplified)
- Gathorne Gathorne-Hardy, 3rd Earl of Cranbrook (1870–1915)
  - John David Gathorne-Hardy, 4th Earl of Cranbrook (1900–1978)
    - Gathorne Gathorne-Hardy, 5th Earl of Cranbrook (1933–2026)
      - John Jason Gathorne-Hardy, 6th Earl of Cranbrook (b. 1968)
      - (1). Hon. Argus Edward Gathorne-Hardy (b. 1973)
        - (2). Jack Hector Jarvis Gathorne-Hardy (b. 2006)
        - (3). Fergus Hawthorne Gathorne-Hardy (b. 2008)
        - (4). Xan Ralph Gathorne-Hardy (b. 2011)
        - (5). Hector Max Gathorne-Hardy (b. 2013)
    - (6). Hon. Hugh Gathorne-Hardy (b. 1941)
      - (7). Frederick Jasper Gathorne-Hardy (b. 1972)
      - (8). Alfred Gathorne-Hardy (b. 1978)
  - Hon. Antony Gathorne Gathorne-Hardy (1907–1976)
    - Jonathan Gathorne Gathorne-Hardy (1933–2019)
      - male issue and descendants in remainder
