= John Gathorne-Hardy, 2nd Earl of Cranbrook =

British hereditary peer, Conservative politician and military officer

The Right Honourable The Earl of Cranbrook VD JP DL

Member of Parliament for Rye
- In office 1868–1880
- Preceded by: Lauchlan Bellingham Mackinnon
- Succeeded by: Frederick Inderwick

Member of the House of Lords Lord Temporal
- In office 30 October 1906 – 13 July 1911
- Preceded by: The 1st Earl of Cranbrook
- Succeeded by: The 3rd Earl of Cranbrook

Personal details
- Born: John Stewart Hardy; 22 March 1839 London, England
- Died: 13 July 1911 (aged 72)
- Spouse: Cicely Ridgway (m. 1867)
- Children: 7, including Gathorne Gathorne-Hardy, 3rd Earl of Cranbrook
- Parent(s): Gathorne Gathorne-Hardy, 1st Earl of Cranbrook; Jane Stewart Orr

John Stewart Gathorne-Hardy, 2nd Earl of Cranbrook, VD, JP, DL (22 March 1839 – 13 July 1911) was a British hereditary peer, Conservative politician, and military officer.

== Early life ==
Born John Stewart Hardy, Lord Cranbrook was the eldest son of the Conservative politician Gathorne Gathorne-Hardy, 1st Earl of Cranbrook, and Jane Stewart Orr. He assumed the additional surname of Gathorne by Royal licence in 1878 and when his father was elevated to the peerage as Earl of Cranbrook in 1892, he gained the courtesy title of Lord Medway.

Cranbrook was educated at Eton and Christ Church, Oxford.

== Career ==
Cranbrook was elected to the House of Commons for Rye in 1868, a seat he held until 1880, and later represented Mid Kent from 1884 to 1885 and Medway from 1885 to 1892. He gained the rank of Lieutenant in the Rifle Brigade. He was made an honorary Colonel in the 5th Weald of Kent Battalion, The Buffs. He was Deputy lieutenant and Justice of the peace, as well as County Alderman, for Kent.

In 1906, he succeeded his father as second Earl of Cranbrook and took his seat in the House of Lords.

== Marriage and children ==
In 1867 at Plaxtol, Lord Cranbrook married Cicely Marguerite Wilhelmina Ridgway, daughter of Joseph Ridgway and Selina Harriet Doyle. They had seven children:

- Lady Selina Marguerite Gathorne-Hardy (1870 – 29 May 1934)
- Gathorne Gathorne-Hardy, 3rd Earl of Cranbrook (18 December 1870 – 23 December 1915)
- Lady Jane Ethel Gathorne-Hardy (1872 – 26 January 1943)
- Gen. Hon. Sir John Francis Gathorne-Hardy (14 January 1874 – 21 August 1949)
- Cdr. Hon. Ralph Cecil North Gathorne-Hardy (19 March 1876 – 30 December 1911)
- Lt.-Col. Hon. Nigel Charles Gathorne-Hardy (31 March 1880 – 17 December 1958)
- Lady Dorothy Milner Gathorne-Hardy (4 January 1889 – 21 February 1977), married Rupert D'Oyly Carte, proprietor of the Savoy Hotel

== Death ==
Lord Cranbrook died in July 1911 at the age of 72 and was succeeded in the earldom by his eldest son, Gathorne. Lady Cranbrook died in 1931.

== Bibliography ==
- Kidd, Charles, Williamson, David (editors). Debrett's Peerage and Baronetage (106th edition) (New York: St Martin's Press 1990)
- Williamson, D (ed.) Debrett's Peerage and Baronetage (107th edition) (London 2002)

Parliament of the United Kingdom
Preceded by Lauchlan Bellingham Mackinnon	Member of Parliament for Rye; 1868–1880	Succeeded by Frederick Andrew Inderwick
Preceded by William Hart Dyke; Sir Edmund Filmer	Member of Parliament for Mid Kent; 1884–1885; With: William Hart Dyke	Constituency abolished
New constituency	Member of Parliament for Medway; 1885–1892	Succeeded by Charles Edward Warde
Peerage of the United Kingdom
Preceded by Gathorne Gathorne-Hardy	Earl of Cranbrook; 1906–1911	Succeeded by Gathorne Gathorne-Hardy
