= George Heywood Hill =

British bookseller (1906–1986)

Heywood Hill
- Born: George Heywood Hill; 29 July 1906
- Died: 1986 (aged 79–80)
- Occupation: Bookseller
- Known for: Founder of the Mayfair bookshop Heywood Hill
- Spouse: Lady Anne Gathorne-Hardy
- Children: 2
- Relatives: Gathorne Gathorne-Hardy, 3rd Earl of Cranbrook (father-in-law); Timothy Behrens (son-in-law)

George Heywood Hill (29 July 1906 – 1986) was a British bookseller, and the founder of the Mayfair bookshop Heywood Hill in 1936.

== Early life ==
He was born in Chelsea, London on 29 July 1906, the son of Major George Bernard Hill OBE (1874-1961), a stockbroker, and Frances Grace Johnstone, daughter of John Heywood Johnstone MP of Bignor Park, Sussex, and they lived at 37 Draycott Place, Chelsea and Great Orchard, Bignor, Pulborough, Sussex. He had a sister Sheila Grace Hill.

== Career ==
On 2 August 1936, he founded Heywood Hill with the help of Lady Anne Gathorne-Hardy, who would later become his wife.

They sold the bookshop in 1965, and retired to his wife's childhood home, Snape Priory, where they cared for her mother until she died in 1969. Following Heywood's death in 1986, after some years with Parkinson's disease, her daughter and son-in-law Harriet and Simon Frazer came to live with her.

== Personal life ==
In 1938, he married Lady Anne Catherine Dorothy Gathorne-Hardy (1911-2006), the daughter of Gathorne Gathorne-Hardy, 3rd Earl of Cranbrook and Lady Dorothy Montagu Boyle. He was a cousin of her sister-in-law Fidelity Cranbrook (née Seebohm, second wife of the 4th Earl). They lived in Warwick Avenue, Maida Vale, and later in Richmond. They had two daughters, Harriet and Rabea.

In 1963, their daughter Harriet married the artist Timothy Behrens, and they had two sons, Algy and Charlie, and a daughter, Fanny. She later married Simon Frazer.

== Death and legacy ==
He died in 1986, having suffered for some years from Parkinson's disease. In 2016, Heywood Hill celebrated 80 years in the same premises with its "Library of a Lifetime Award" which will give the winner "one newly published and hand-picked hardback book per month, for life, delivered anywhere in the world".
