= Heywood Hill =

Bookshop in Mayfair, London, England

Coordinates: 51.5070°N 0.1466°W

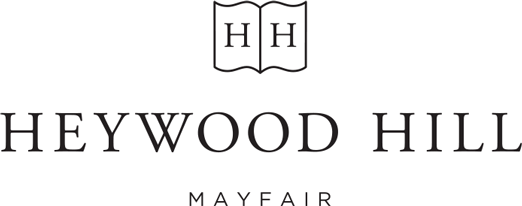

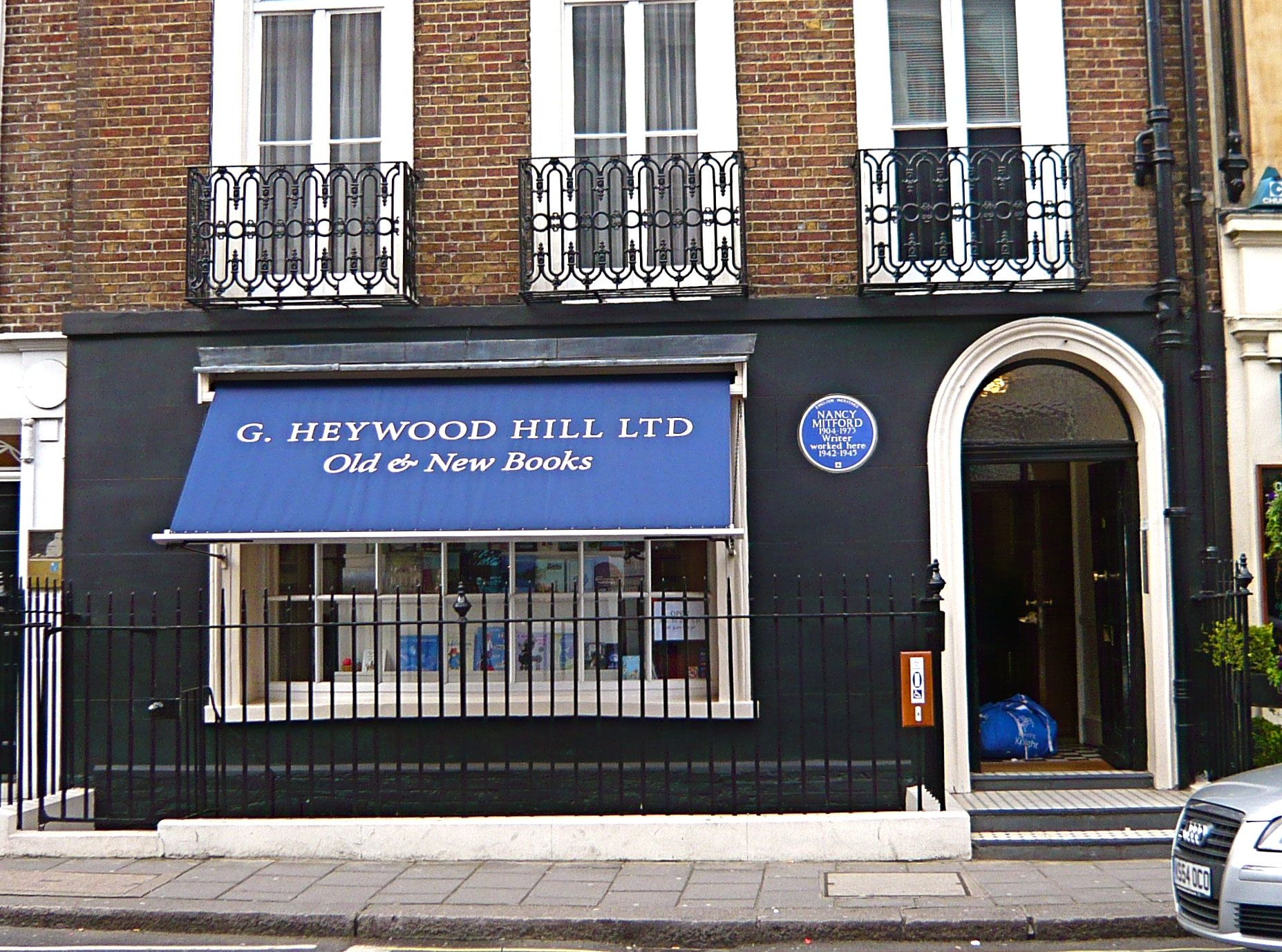
- Industry: Bookshop
- Founded: 1936; 90 years ago
- Founder: George Heywood Hill
- Headquarters: 10 Curzon Street, London, W1
- Website: heywoodhill.com

Heywood Hill is a bookshop at 10 Curzon Street, in the Mayfair district of London.

== History ==
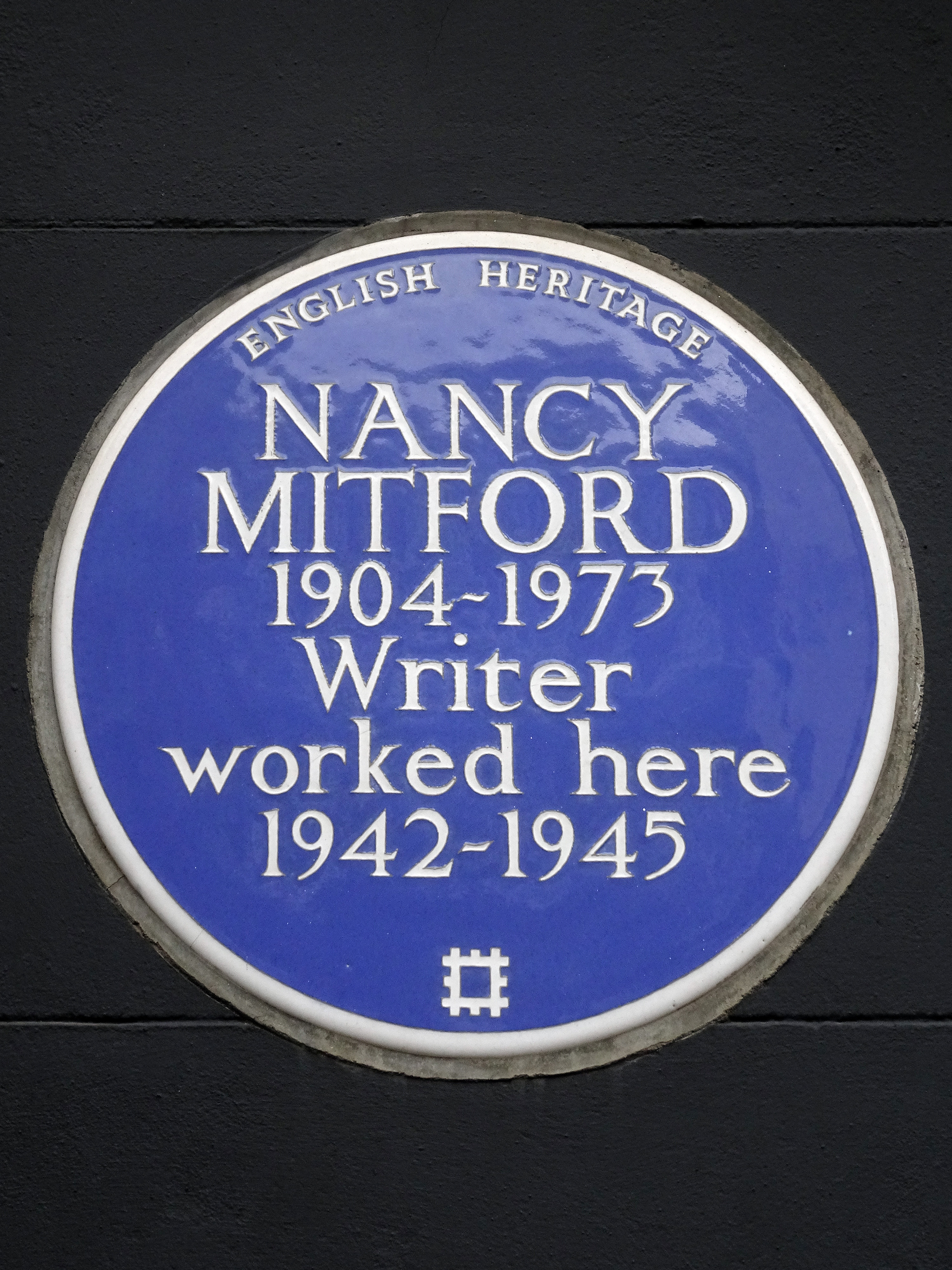
Blue plaque commemorating Nancy Mitford, who worked at the bookshop during the Second World War

The shop was opened by George Heywood Hill on 3 August 1936, with the help of Lady Anne Gathorne-Hardy, who would later become his wife.

For the last three years of the Second World War, while George Heywood Hill was in the Army, Lady Anne ran the shop with the assistance of the novelist Nancy Mitford. In 1949, Elizabeth Forbes, the daughter of Admiral Sir Charles Forbes, joined the staff of the shop where she worked prior to her career as a journalist, music critic, and musicologist. In the period following Heywood Hill's retirement, the shop was managed by Handasyde Buchanan, a notable contributor to books on natural history who had joined the shop in 1945. John Saumarez Smith, who had joined the staff straight from Cambridge in 1965, took up the reins as manager in 1974 following Buchanan's retirement, a position he held for over thirty years. In 1991, the shop was bought by Nancy Mitford's brother-in-law, Andrew Cavendish, 11th Duke of Devonshire.

Since 2016, the shop has been owned by Mitford's nephew Peregrine Cavendish, 12th Duke of Devonshire. It has been managed by his son-in-law, Nicky Dunne since 2011. Heywood Hill specialises in rare books and collections of books, and has a service of assembling and delivering bespoke libraries for customers. It has been described as the late Queen's favourite bookshop. Queen Elizabeth II granted the shop her Royal warrant in 2011, while Queen Camilla granted hers in May 2026.

== See also ==
- Heywood Hill Literary Prize
