= Margaret Goschen, Viscountess Goschen =

British aristocrat (1858-1943)

Lady Margaret Evelyn Gathorne-Hardy Viscountess Goschen CI, DStJ
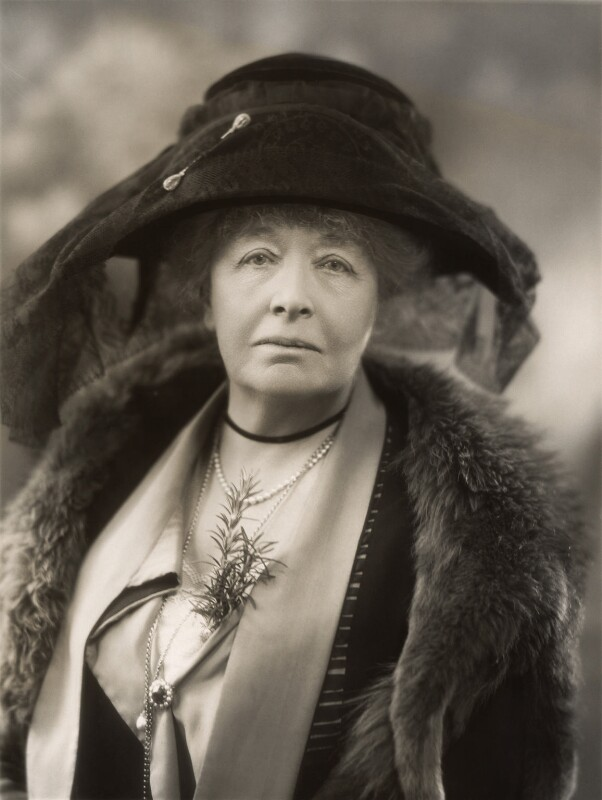
- Lady Goschen in 1923
- Born: 4 July 1858; Benenden, Kent, England
- Died: 11 July 1943 (aged 85)
- Known for: Viscountess Goschen Government Girls High School, Tharanallur, Tamil Nadu, India
- Spouse: George Goschen, 2nd Viscount Goschen (m. 1893)
- Children: 3
- Parents: Gathorne Gathorne-Hardy (father); Jane Stewart Orr (mother)
- Relatives: John Stewart Gathorne-Hardy (brother); Dorothy Gathorne-Hardy (niece)

Margaret Evelyn Goschen, Viscountess Goschen, CI, DStJ (née Gathorne-Hardy; 4 July 1858 – 11 July 1943) was a British aristocrat, the wife of George Goschen, 2nd Viscount Goschen, Governor of Madras, who was appointed acting Viceroy of India in 1929. She was thus Vicereine of India between 1929 and 1931.

Born Lady Margaret Evelyn Gathorne-Hardy, she was the daughter of prominent Conservative politician Gathorne Gathorne-Hardy, 1st Earl of Cranbrook and his wife Jane Stewart Orr. She was baptised at Benenden, Kent on 4 July 1858. Her elder brother John Stewart Gathorne-Hardy succeeded to the Earldom of Cranbrook upon the death of their father in 1906. Her niece was Dorothy D'Oyly Carte, wife of Rupert D'Oyly Carte.

On 26 January 1893, she married The Hon. George Joachim Goschen, son of prominent Liberal politician George Goschen, 1st Viscount Goschen and heir to the Viscountcy. Lady Margaret was eight-years his senior; Lord Goschen disapproved of the marriage and in an attempt to prevent it, sent his son to Australia to act as Secretary to Lord Jersey. The marriage took place nonetheless. They had three children during the course of their marriage:

- Lt. Hon. George Joachim Goschen (18 November 1893 – 16 January 1916), officer of the 7th Battalion, East Kent Regiment, expected to succeed, but died of wounds received in action at the Siege of Kut.
- Hon. Phyllis Evelyn Goschen (5 August 1895 – 27 May 1976), Lady-in-Waiting to Her Royal Highness the Princess Royal 1948–1965, married Lt Col. Francis Cecil Campbell Balfour, nephew of Prime Minister Arthur Balfour and grandson of George Campbell, 8th Duke of Argyll.
- Hon. Cicely Winifred Goschen (29 April 1899 – 1980), married Maj. Melville Edward Bertram Portal, who had previously served as secretary to the Governor of Madras, in India.

Lady Goschen gave her name to the Viscountess Goschen Government Girls High School in Tharanallur, Tiruchirappalli, Tamil Nadu, and also to the Lady Goschen Hospital in Mangalore, Karnataka. She was appointed Lady of Grace, Most Venerable Order of Saint John (LGStJ). She was later appointed Dame of Grace, Most Venerable Order of Saint (DStJ). She was awarded the Imperial Order of the Crown of India (CI) in the 1930 New Year Honours. She was awarded the Kaisar-i-Hind Gold Medal for her charitable works and services to Raj.
