= Norman Marjoribanks =

British civil servant

Sir Norman Marjoribanks KCIE CSI

Governor of Madras (acting)
- In office 29 June 1929 – 11 November 1929
- Governor General: George Goschen, 2nd Viscount Goschen
- Preceded by: George Goschen, 2nd Viscount Goschen
- Succeeded by: George Frederick Stanley

Member of the Executive Council of the Governor of Madras
- Premier: Raja of Panagal, P. Subbarayan
- Governor: George Goschen, 2nd Viscount Goschen

Personal details
- Born: Norman Edward Marjoribanks; 16 October 1872 British India
- Died: August 1939 (age 67) Ootacamund, Madras, British India
- Education: Trinity College, Cambridge

Sir Norman Edward Marjoribanks KCIE CSI (16 October 1872 – August 1939) was a British magistrate and civil servant in India who served as the acting Governor of Madras from 29 June 1929 to 11 November 1929.

Marjoribanks was born in 1872 into a Scottish family and was educated in India and the United Kingdom, where he spent most of his childhood. In 1891, he passed the Indian Civil Service exam and was allocated to the Madras Presidency. He served as the home member of the Governor's executive council in the 1920s and as the acting Governor of Madras until the arrival of Governor-designate, George Frederick Stanley from England. Marjoribanks also served in the committee which investigated the problems of Tamil indentured labourers in Sri Lanka.

== Early life ==
Norman Marjoribanks was born in India on 16 October 1872 and received his early education at Bishop Cotton's School and College, Bangalore. He received his higher education from Belfast Royal Academy, Royal University of Ireland and Trinity College, Cambridge. He passed his Indian Civil Service examinations in 1891 and was appointed as Assistant Collector and magistrate.

== In the Civil Service ==
Marjoribanks served in Madras as Assistant Collector and Magistrate from 29 October 1893 to July 1901. In March 1900, he was appointed Officiating Under-Secretary of the Revenue Department. He served as a member on the Board of Revue and the Commissioner of Salt and Excise, Madras. He also served as the Home member in the executive council of the Governor of Madras, under George Goschen, 2nd Viscount Goschen. When Goschen's tenure came to an end, Marjoribanks was appointed acting Governor until the arrival of George Frederick Stanley.

== Commission on the situation of Plantation Tamils of Ceylon ==
Following protests against indentured labour by activists of the Indian independence movement, the Government of India aPpointed a commission under Charles George Todhunter to investigate the condition of the plantation Tamils of Ceylon. On 22 October 1916, the Government of Madras overruled the decision of the Indian Government and replaced Todhunter with Marjoribanks. C. E. Low, the Secretary of the Department of Commerce and Industry, Government of India, complained to Sir George Barnes over the "bad behaviour" of the Madras Government. He suspected the abilities of Marjoribanks, saying "he is not quite class enough, socially and from the point of personality, to do us well". Barnes then conveyed his strong opposition to the India Office. However, the Governor of Madras, Lord Pentland gave Marjoribanks his full support:

He is careful, generally well-informed, and will be thoroughly master of his subject. He is eminently of cool temperament and sound judgement: and to a keen and critical intellect and the giver of clear and concise expression he adds the advantage of a long Secretariat experience

The Emigration Bench examined his service record and approved his candidature saying that "his record looks as if he is a pretty good man". Eventually, a delegation comprising Marjoribanks and A. K. G. Ahmad Thambi Marakkayar left for Ceylon on 19 November 1916 and spent six months gathering information from the planters and the Government of Ceylon. The team prepared a report which was submitted at a conference held at London in May 1917. In the final report, the team pointed out the defects of the existing kangani system. But strangely, the report did not examine indentured labour on the whole. As a result, when the report was made public, it was criticized by Indian nationalists.

== As Acting Governor of Madras ==
Marjoribanks served as the Home member in the Executive Council of Governor George Goschen. When Goschen's term came to an end in July 1929, Marjoribanks was appointed as acting Governor of Madras until the arrival of governor-designate, George Frederick Stanley from England. Marjoribanks served as Acting Governor of Madras from 29 June 1929 to 11 November 1929.

== Later life ==
On the expiry of his term, Marjoribanks retired to Ootacamund, the summer residence of the Madras government. He died in 1939.

== Honours ==
Marjoribanks was made a Companion of the Order of the Indian Empire in 1919 and later promoted to a Knight Commander of the Order of the Indian Empire. He was made a Companion of the Order of the Star of India in 1922.

== Notes ==
Preceded by	Home Member of the Executive Council of the Governor of Madras	Succeeded by
Preceded by Lord Goschen	Governor of Madras (acting); 29 June 1929 – 11 November 1929	Succeeded by George Frederick Stanley
