= Singarathope =

- Neighbourhood
- Singarathope, Tiruchirappalli, Tamil Nadu
- Coordinates: 10.8241°N 78.6980°E
- Country: India
- State: Tamil Nadu
- District: Tiruchirappalli
- Elevation: 98.69 m (323.8 ft)

Languages
  - Official: Tamil, English
  - Speech: Tamil, English
- Time zone: UTC+5:30 (IST)
- PIN: 620008
- Telephone code: +91431*******
- Vehicle registration: TN 45 yy xxxx
- Other Neighbourhoods: Palakkarai, Teppakulam, Devathanam, Tharanallur, Varaganeri, Thillai Nagar, Puthur, Tennur, Uraiyur, Srirangam, Thiruvanaikaval
- Corporation: Tiruchirappalli City Corporation

Singarathope (சிங்காரத்தோப்பு) is a neighbourhood in the city of Tiruchirappalli in Tamil Nadu, India. It lies between Devathanam and Tharanallur. There is a showroom of handloom chain Poompuhar located here.
