= St Augustine's Church, Flimwell =

St Augustine's, Flimwell
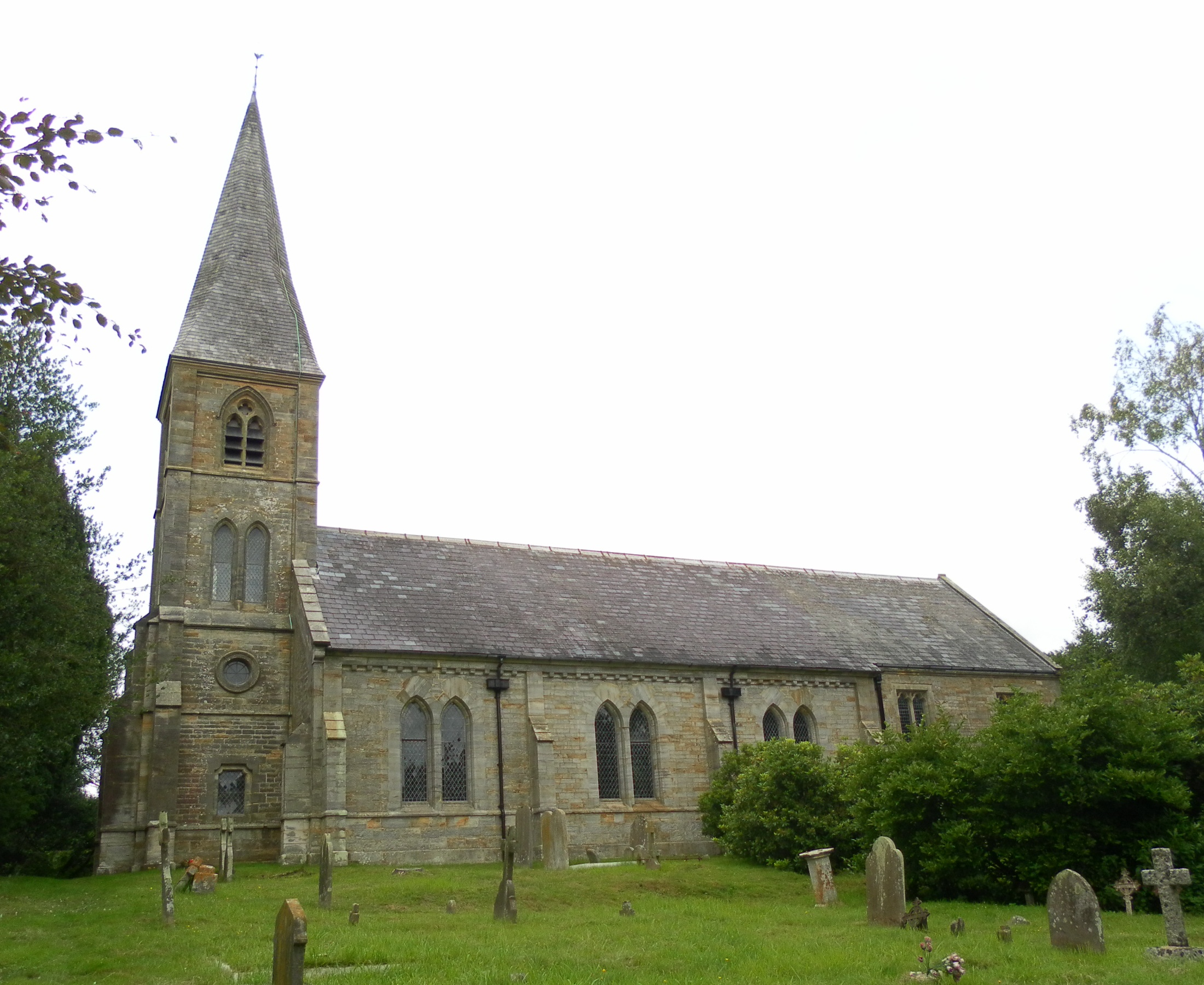
- The church from the south
- St Augustine's, Flimwell
- 51.0514°N 0.4593°E
- OS grid reference: TQ 7246 3088
- Denomination: Church of England
- Churchmanship: Anglo-Catholic
- Website: St Augustine church, Flimwell

History
- Dedication: Augustine of Canterbury

Administration
- Province: Canterbury
- Diocese: Chichester
- Archdeaconry: Lewes and Hastings
- Deanery: Rotherfield

Clergy
- Vicar: Fr Jason Radcliff

St Augustine's Church is the Anglican parish church of Flimwell, a village in the Rother district of East Sussex, England. It was consecrated in 1839 after architect Decimus Burton had built the nave and tower, which was then topped with a spire in 1873. The building was extended six years later by the addition of a chancel. The church has grade II listed building status. In 1978 the parish was pastorally reorganized into a United Benefice with the neighboring St Mary's Ticehurst.

== History ==
=== Early history ===
Consecrated in 1839, the Parish Church of St Augustine of Canterbury, Flimwell, was erected on what was then known as the Furzy Fields, and was completed in 1839. The building as originally erected was much smaller than it is today, consisting only of what now constitutes the nave. The tower was only a squat, flat-roofed appendage without a spire. lt was from the roof of the tower that Sir J. F. W. Herschel, the famous astronomer who lived at Hawkhurst, made many of his observations.

The project was made possible by the generosity of Richard Bury Palliser (then owner of Seacox Heath), The Reverend Richard Wetherall (of Pashley Manor), George Campion Courthope (of Whiligh Manor), and James Lambert (of Hawkhurst). The church was built as an Anglo-Catholic and Tractarian option for the historically evangelical Weald region. The altar remains eastward facing, with Holy Communion celebrated ad orientem.

=== Later developments ===
The shingled spire was added in 1872 at about the same time that the present chancel was built. The tower contains four bells: three were given in 1873 by Mrs Creed, and the fourth (the treble) was added a year later at a cost of £40, which was subscribed by the ringers themselves. In the north-east corner of the nave stood the capacious curtained pew of Mr Palliser, the squire of Seacox; and underneath was constructed a vault for interment of members of his family. It is in fact still empty, because although a younger son of Mr Palliser was buried in it, his remains were later removed to the churchyard, where other members of his family lie at rest. On the north wall of the nave is a memorial to the men of the parish who gave their lives in the 1914–1918 war. A similar but less elaborate plaque on the same wall commemorates those who fell in the 1939–1945 war. The pulpit is made of intricately carved panels of old oak, collected at different times by Father C. J. Eagleton.

The parish registers begin with the baptism on 9 August 1839 of Henry St Leger, son of Richard Bury Palliser and his wife Jane. The early years of the baptismal records contain an extraordinary number of illegitimate births – well over 50% at times – most of which are from the inmates of Union House, Flimwell having presumably taken this over from Ticehurst, where the same was true until 1839, when Flimwell church was erected. Flimwell church – rooted in the Anglo-Catholic tradition – has thus always been not only "high church" liturgically but committed to outreach and pastoral care for the outcast and needy in society.

The original vicarage was located just west of the church but was sold in 1965. The church is built of stone with a slate roof and is approached from the main road through a lych-gate. Inside, there is a nave without side-aisles. Within the chancel is a small pipe organ, in an alcove on the north side. The pews are mostly of pine, and the floor is part York stone and part tiles. Inside the roof are timber beams and plaster. Near the west end of the church's interior is a font cased in carved modern oak, and across the aisle sits an alcove which formerly housed a small Lady chapel. About sixty individual hassocks ("kneelers") have been covered with tapestry, each with different hand-worked floral designs.

=== Rev. C. J. Eagleton SSC, and The Lord Viscount Goschen ===
The fifth incumbent, Father C. J. Eagleton SSC (1867), became a priest of the English Church Union and the Confraternity of the Blessed Sacrament, from the earliest days of those societies, and was one of the founding visionaries of the Society of the Holy Cross (being the 15th to join, in 1857), suggesting a very Catholic history for the parish from its inception. Father Eagleton's spiritual imprint upon the churchmanship and piety of the parish cannot be overstated. Father Eagleton was the second son of John Eagleton, of Luffenham, Co. Rutland. He graduated from Queen's College, Oxford, and was ordained a deacon in 1853 by the bishop of Chichester and then a priest in 1855 by the bishop of London. Serving at Flimwell church for 47 years, prior to which he was Fellow of St Nicholas' College, Shoreham; chaplain to Her Majesty's Printers, London; and incumbent of St Columba, Largs. Father Eagleton resigned the incumbency of Flimwell in 1914 due to advanced age and died on 28 April 1917. He is buried in the Flimwell churchyard and is commemorated in the church with a memorial tablet in the chancel where he said Mass for so many decades, erected by parishioners.

The village and church of Flimwell would not have become what they did without the influence, beneficence, generosity, and piety of George Goschen, 2nd Viscount Goschen. Undoubtedly Lord Goschen's faith and churchmanship were indelibly shaped and influenced by the fifth vicar of Flimwell, Father Eagleton, who was the incumbent from Lord Goschen's 1st year to 48th year of life. Father Eagleton, assuredly, would have devoted significant energy to the shaping of the young nobleman in his parish, recognizing his sphere of influence and possibility for doing good work for the Church.

Although the bishop of Chichester has served as patron of Flimwell since the church's beginning, both the 1st and 2nd Viscount Goschen owned and resided in the nearby Seacox Heath and served very much as a benefactors of the parish, with the latter funding entirely the restoration, expansion, and beautification of the interior of the church. The Goschen family (both the 1st and 2nd viscounts) were long associated with the parish. Lord Goschen (2nd Viscount) restored and beautified the chancel in the very English (Sarum) Anglo-Catholic style of the day in 1916 as a memorial to his only son, the Hon. G. J. Goschen of the 5th Buffs Regiment, who was killed that year in Mesopotamia, aged 22 years. The work included a mosaic wall with an aumbry on the north side of the chancel near the altar (which remains in use with the reserved sacrament in the present day), the erection of a beautiful carved rood screen with images of Christ on the cross with the Blessed Mother and St John on either side, filling the east window with stained glass, adding dossal curtains to the altar reredos, and the construction of a large vestry. Other stained glass in the church commemorates his parents, the first Viscount Goschen and his wife Lucy. Similarly, over the decades that followed Lord Goschen donated (dedicated to his family members) several missals and altar books–including an English Missal–seeing them put into use in the parish in the years that followed. Lord Goschen also erected a memorial – almost reliquary-esque in feel – to his son with a prie-dieu, asking for prayers for his son by the faithful visiting Flimwell church. Several members of the family were later buried in the church, including William Henry Goschen

At some point in the early to mid 20th century, Low Mass sets were acquired for the parish made by Warham Guild, consisting of chasuble, stole, and maniple with matching burse and veil in green, purple, red, white, and – notably – black, along with matching apparels (for the alb) and altar paraments; these are still in use today. Lord Goschen was known in the years following his son's death to make the "church walk" – a walk from Seacox Heath to Flimwell church to pray at the memorial to his lost child – daily.

Accordingly, both Father Eagleton and Lord Goschen's Catholic churchmanship and piety shaped the fabric of Flimwell church in significant ways. Lord Goschen took seriously not only the care of his parish church but also his village. He built (funding exclusively) housing projects in Flimwell, constructed mainly for family members of the workers on his estate but also for villagers.

== Incumbents of Flimwell ==
1840 Rev G. Greaves (Patron: Bishop of Chichester)

1842 Rev. H. P. Haughton (Patron: Bishop of Chichester)

1844 Rev. W. Adamson (Patron: Bishop of Chichester)

1856 Rev. F. Howlett (Patron: Bishop of Chichester)

1867 Rev C. J. Eagleton SSC (Patron: Bishop of Chichester)

1914 Rev. A. N. Johnson (Patron: Bishop of Chichester)

1932 Rev. K. G. Packard (Patron: Bishop of Chichester)

1942 Rev. J. H. Maxwell-Staniforth (Patron: Bishop of Chichester)

1943 Rev. S . W. A. Collins (Patron: Bishop of Chichester)

1947 Rev L. Richardson (Patron: Bishop of Chichester)

1953 Rev. R. E. Scott (Patron: Bishop of Chichester)

1956 Rev. J. Victor (Patron: Bishop of Chichester)

1961 Rev. G. A. Armistead (Patron: Bishop of Chichester)

1963 Rev. A. W. Parfitt (Patron: Bishop of Chichester)

1964 Interregnum

1967 Rev. F. O. Taylor, Priest-in-Charge (Patron: Bishop of Chichester)

1979 Rev. W. H. Prudom, jointly with Ticehurst (Patron: Bishop of Chichester; John Hardcastle, joint with Ticehurst)

1981 Rev. Benjamin Clive Williams, B.A. (Patron: Bishop of Chichester; John Hardcastle, joint with Ticehurst)

1990 Rev. Roy John Goodchild (Patron: Bishop of Chichester; John Hardcastle and Francis Drewe, joint with Ticehurst)

2006 Rev. Timothy John Mills (Patron: Bishop of Chichester; James Sellick and Keith Miller, joint with Ticehurst)

2017 Rev. Ashley Edwards (Patron: Bishop of Chichester; James Sellick and Keith Miller, joint with Ticehurst)

2025 Rev. Jason Robert Radcliff SSC, M.A., Ph.D. (Patron: Bishop of Chichester; Angela Sellick and John Pilcher, joint with Ticehurst)

== See also ==
- List of places of worship in Rother
