= Ticehurst =

Village and civil parish in East Sussex, England

Coordinates: 51.05°N 0.41°E

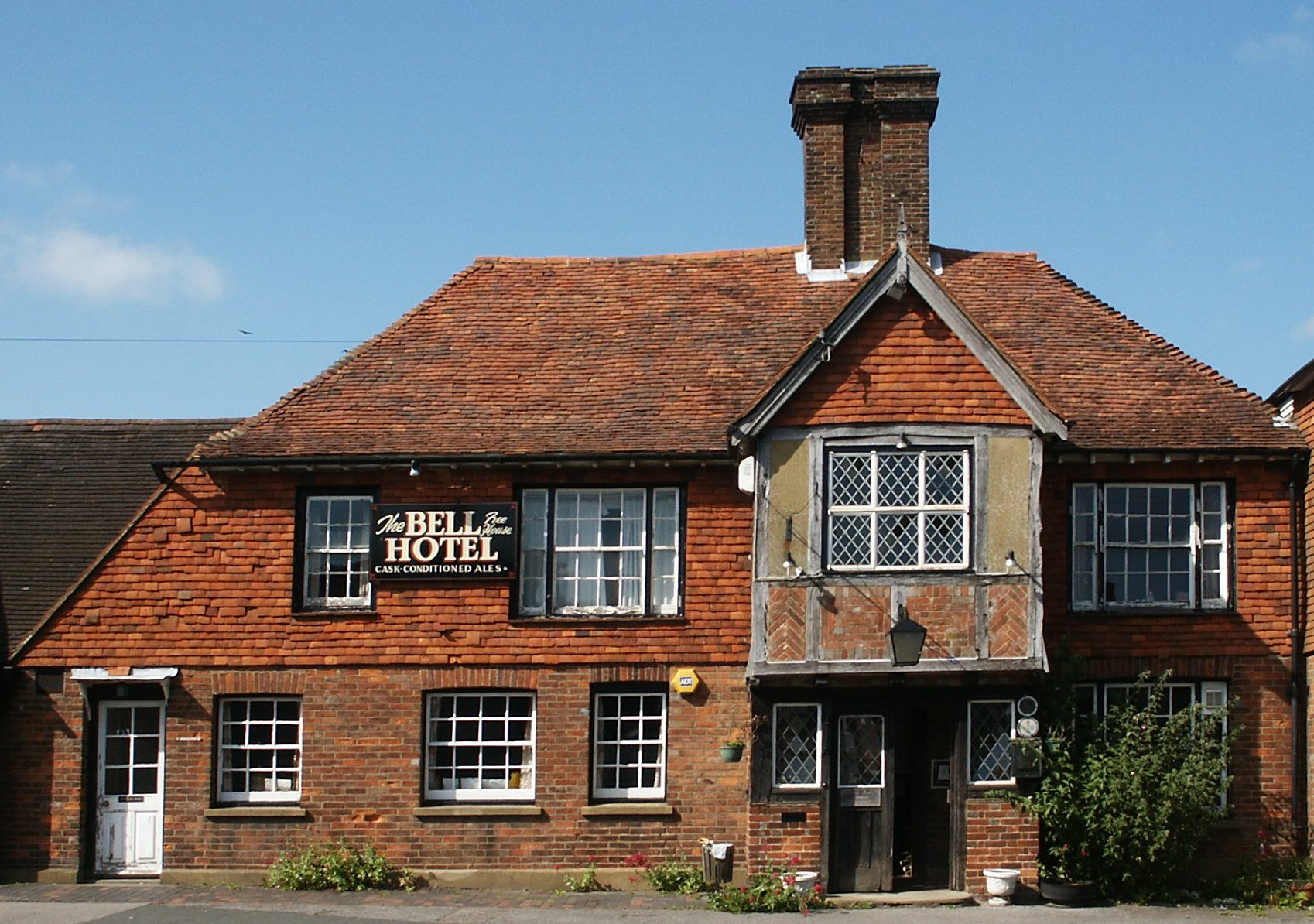
- The Bell in Ticehurst

- Location within East Sussex
- Area: 32.5 km^{2} (12.5 sq mi)
- Population: 3,873 (Parish-2011)
  - Density: 273/sq mi (105/km^{2})
- OS grid reference: TQ689302
  - London: 39 miles (63 km) NW
- Civil parish: Ticehurst
- District: Rother
- Shire county: East Sussex
- Region: South East
- Country: England
- Sovereign state: United Kingdom
- Post town: WADHURST
- Postcode district: TN5
- Dialling code: 01580
- Police: Sussex
- Fire: East Sussex
- Ambulance: South East Coast
- UK Parliament: Bexhill and Battle
- Website: Ticehurst Parish Council

Ticehurst is both a village and a large civil parish in the Rother district of East Sussex, England. The parish lies in the upper reaches of both the Bewl stream before it enters Bewl Water and in the upper reaches of the River Rother flowing to the south-east. The parish includes the parish wards of Ticehurst, Flimwell and Stonegate. The linear settlements of Berner's Hill and Union Street lie between Ticehurst and Flimwell. It lies to the south-east of Tunbridge Wells, and is about ten miles (16 km) distant.

== History ==
Ticehurst is not mentioned in the Domesday Book of 1086; the manor came into being in the 14th century. Pashley Manor is also mentioned at the same time, and is within the parish.

The village's name derives from Old English; there are two possible derivations. The most plausible one is that it means ‘wood on the Teise’ from the river; the second roughly translates as 'The wooded hill where young goats graze', ticce(n) + hyrst. (1248, Tycheherst)

Ticehurst was a centre of the Wealden ironworking industry.

== Governance ==
Ticehurst is part of the electoral ward called Ticehurst and Etchingham. The population of this ward at the 2011 census was 4,679.

== The villages ==
=== Ticehurst ===
There is an active village club, which runs regular social events, and a monthly newsletter "News & Views" which is produced by a team of volunteers. The village school serves both Ticehurst and Flimwell. There is also a comprehensive website covering most of the activities in the community.

Ticehurst House Hospital (now part of the Priory Group) specialises in the treatment of psychiatric disorders and is located on the western edge of the village. Samuel Newington opened the original Ticehurst House in 1792, as a place dedicated to the care and treatment of psychiatric illness.

The Victorian hymn composer, John Bacchus Dykes—he composed Melita ('Eternal Father Strong to Save') among other tunes—spent his last years as a patient in Ticehurst House.

From 1974 to July 2018 the village was home to the headquarters of the Antiquarian Horological Society, at New House, on the village square.

The village is also home to Maynard's Fruit Farm, made The Times "Top 50 places to eat outside in Britain" list. Outside the village there are dairies at Northiam and Stonegate, a bakery at Bodiam, family butcher in Etchingham, a smokery in Flimwell and two more pubs at Three Leg Cross and Dale Hill.

The Scottish singer/guitarist Bert Jansch lived in Ticehurst in the late 1960s and recorded tracks for his 1971 Rosemary Lane album in his house in the village. Ticehurst was also the final residence of Evelyn Waugh's first wife, Evelyn Nightingale. The village church, St Mary's, was the venue for the wedding of her son, the journalist and theatre critic Benedict Nightingale, to the author Anne Redmon.

Pashley Manor Gardens is promoted by the Historic Houses Association and by the Campaign to Protect Rural England. The gardens hold an annual tulip festival each spring.

=== Flimwell ===
Flimwell is a linear village, lying either side of the main road. Other settlements are Union Street and Dale Hill to the west, and Seacox Heath to the east. Flimwell covers an area of approximately 860 acres (350 ha), with about 5% of the area being built up.

=== Stonegate ===
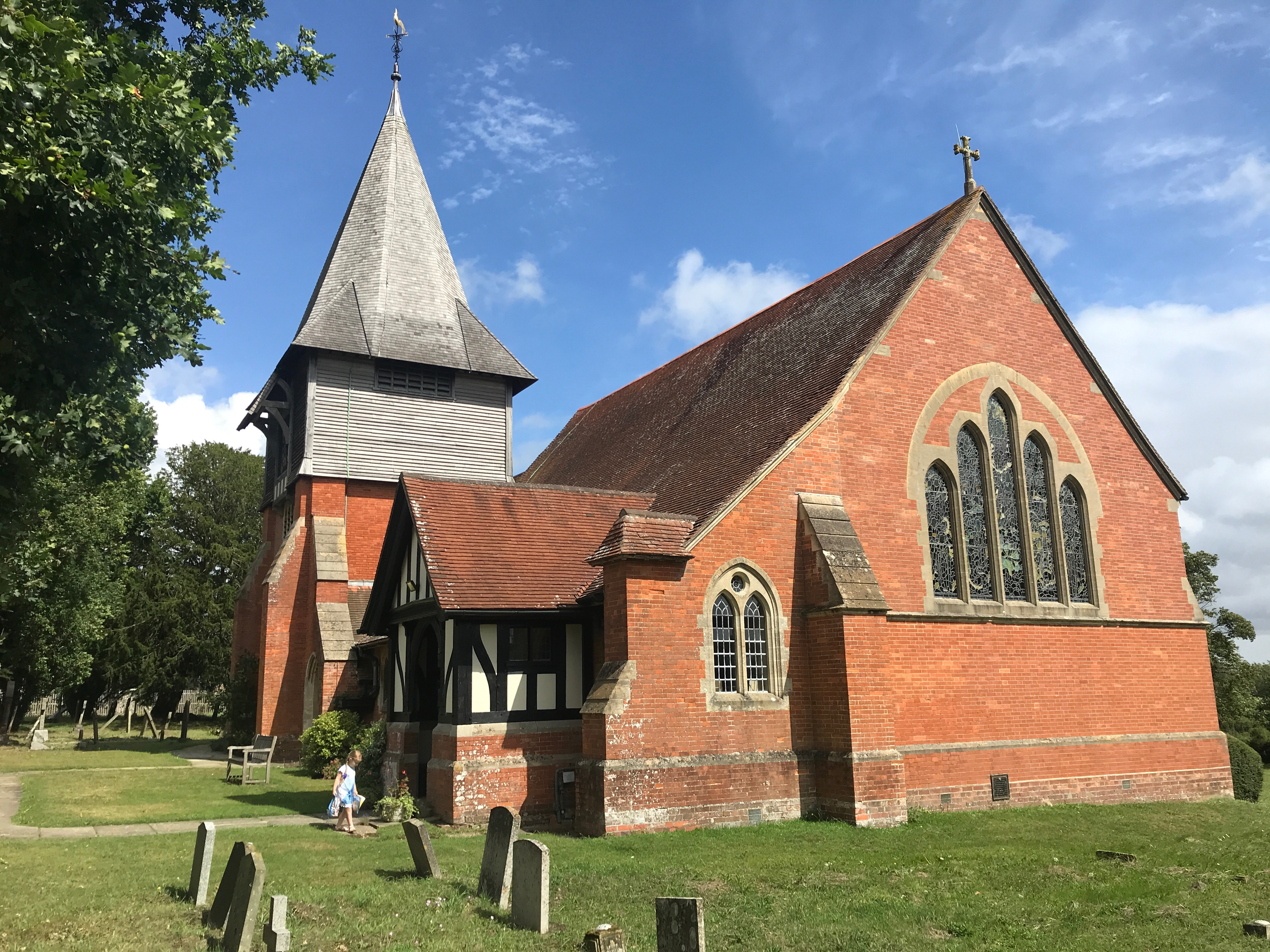
The parish church of St Peter, Stonegate.

South-east from Ticehurst and due north-east from Burwash, is the small village of Stonegate.

It came into being at the same time as the railway line from Tunbridge Wells. The station at Stonegate has hourly train services to London (Charing Cross and Cannon Street) and to Hastings. The next stop from Stonegate to London is Wadhurst and towards Hastings is Etchingham.

In Stonegate, there is a Church of England primary school, and the Anglican parish church of St Peter.

== Religious sites ==
The three village churches are:

- St Mary's Church, Ticehurst, a 14th-century parish church dedicated to St Mary the Virgin
- St Peter's Church, Stonegate
- St Augustine's Church, Flimwell
- Hail Burwash

== Transport ==
There is a railway station nearby, at Stonegate (until 1947 it was called Ticehurst Road; and before that Witherenden); and there is a bus link to Wadhurst railway station.

== See also ==
Listed buildings in Ticehurst
