= William Henry Goschen =

British banker (1870–1943)

William Henry Goschen KBE
- Born: June 7, 1870; United Kingdom
- Died: June 16, 1943 (aged 73)
- Occupations: Businessman, banker
- Known for: Chair of Royal London Hospital 1931-1943
- Spouse: Geraldine Elizabeth Mellor (m. 1896; died 1918)
- Children: 4
- Father: George Goschen, 1st Viscount Goschen
- Relatives: Sir William Henry Neville Goschen (known as Harry Goschen), cousin

Sir William Henry Goschen, KBE (7 June 1870-16 June 1943) was a British businessman and banker from the prominent Goschen family.

== Family early life ==
Born 7 June 1870, William Henry Goschen was the youngest son of the first Viscount Goschen, George Goschen. He was younger brother to George Goschen, 2nd Viscount Goschen. He was a cousin of William Henry Neville Goschen who was the son of Henry Goschen (1837-1932).

Goschen was educated at Rugby (Cotton House) 1883-1889 and then at New College, Oxford. He married Geraldine Elizabeth Mellor on 25 July 1896 (died 1918), youngest daughter of John W Mellor KC, of Culmhead, Taunton. They had two sons and two daughters. His son, William Henry Goschen, was born on 26 March 1900 and was killed in action on 6 May 1944. His second son, John Alexander Goschen, was born on 7 July 1906.

== Career and voluntary positions ==
Goschen was quickly made a partner in the family banking firm, Fruhling and Goschen, which was renamed Goschens and Cunliffe in 1920. He remained active in this role throughout his career until 1940 when he retired from banking. Goschen remained active in several posts in the City of London that were important to him after 1940, including Chair of Sun Insurance Office, Chair of Sun Life Assurance, and Chair of the Union Discount Company of London.

Goschen held a number of voluntary positions, including: Royal College of Nursing Honorary Treasurer 1919-1941; Commissioner of Public Works Loan Board; Chair of Royal London Hospital 1931-1943; and the Honorary Treasurer and Chair of the British Red Cross & St John War Organisation Finance Committee.

== Recognition ==
In 1917 he was appointed a Knight Commander of the Most Excellent Order of the British Empire (KBE), and he was a Knight of Grace of The Most Venerable Order of the Hospital of Saint John of Jerusalem. He was Warden of the King's Chapel of the Savoy, where he regularly attended and read the lesson for over forty years.

== Social life ==
Goschen was a keen cricketer; he played with I Zingari and at the end of 'Canterbury Week' cricket matches took part in 'Old Stagers' amateur dramatics performances. He was also in the amateur dramatics group 'Windsor Strollers' and was a golfer.

== Death ==
Goschen died at the London Hospital on 16 June 1943,and is buried in St Augustine's Church, Flimwell, Sussex which was supported by the Goschen family.

Sir William Goschen was heir presumptive to his brother, Viscount Goschenn. His oldest son, Brigadier William Henry Goschen of the Scots Guards subsequently became heir presumptive to his uncle. Brigadier William Henry Goschen was killed in action just one year later in Burma, on 6 May 1944 at age 44. Goschen's second son John Alexander Goschen, born on 7 July 1906, became the 3rd Viscount Goschen.

The Times obituary noted:

By his death the 'London' has lost more than a chairman. He was a personal friend of every one in the hospital; in spite of the many calls on his time he never appeared to be too busy to attend personally to the smallest detail. He possessed the great gift of being intensely interested in the person to whom he was speaking, and he liked to discuss hospital life and all its aspects with the medical and nursing staffs. He knew every sister and senior member of the hospital staff by name and record, and no one ever asked for his help or advice in vain. His weekly visits to the wards and departments were greatly appreciated by every patient and member of the nursing staff. He will long be remembered with affection and gratitude by all those who had the privilege of working for him.
