= Order of the Crown of India =

Dormant British order of chivalry established 1878

Imperial Order of the Crown of India
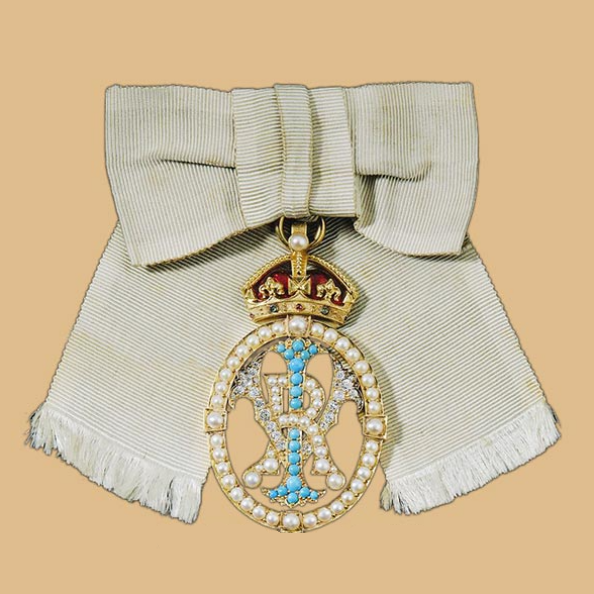
- The insignia of the Imperial Order of the Crown of India

Awarded by the British monarch
- Type: Order of Chivalry
- Eligibility: British princesses, wives or female relatives of Indian princes
- Status: Last appointment in 1947; Dormant order since 2022
- Post-nominals: CI
- Ribbon of the order

The Imperial Order of the Crown of India is an order in the British honours system. The Order was established by Queen Victoria when she became Empress of India in January 1878. The Order was open to only women, and no appointments have been made since the Partition of India in 1947. The Order was limited to British princesses, female Indian rulers (for example the Nawab Begums of Bhopal), wives or female relatives of Indian princes, and the wife or female relatives of any person who held the office of:

- Viceroy of India
- Governor of Madras
- Governor of Bombay
- Governor of Bengal
- Commander-in-Chief India
- Secretary of State for India
- Governor-General of India

== History ==
The Order of the Crown of India was established by Queen Victoria in 1878 as a companion order to the Order of the Indian Empire for men, created on the same day, and had some similarities to the Order of Victoria and Albert. The order was intended to recognize women associated with India, within strictly defined limits of social status. It was to be conferred on members of the British royal family aged over eighteen, members of the families of the Indian princes, other Indian ladies, and wives and relations of certain very high officials of the Indian Empire.

It is one of the honours reserved for women only, such as the Royal Red Cross, Order of Victoria and Albert and the Royal Family Orders.

Queen Elizabeth II, then Princess Elizabeth, and her sister, Princess Margaret, were appointed to the Order by their father, King George VI, in June 1947, before British India was partitioned two months later, making them among the last women to be presented with the Order. By the late 20th century, there were only four living recipients – Queen Elizabeth II, Queen Elizabeth the Queen Mother, Princess Margaret, and Princess Alice, Duchess of Gloucester, who was the last ordinary member at the time of her death in 2004.

With the death of the last surviving holder, Queen Elizabeth II, the last active imperial Indian order became extinct in 2022.

== Description ==
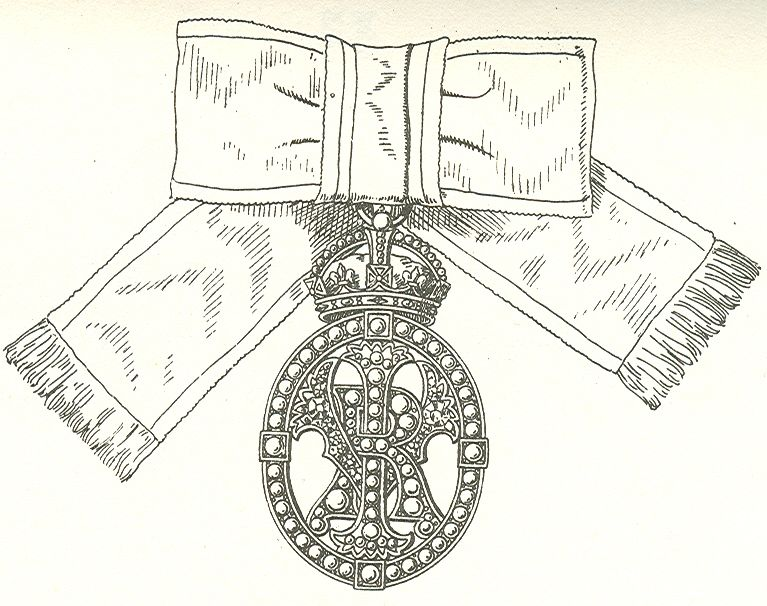
Badge of the order

The members of the Order could use the post-nominal letters "CI", but did not acquire any special precedence or status due to it. Furthermore, they were entitled to wear the badge of the Order, which included Queen Victoria's Imperial Cypher, VRI (Victoria Regina Imperatrix). The letters were set in diamonds, pearls, and turquoises, and were together surrounded by a border of pearls surmounted by a figure of the Imperial Crown.

The badge was normally worn attached to a light blue bow, edged in white, on the left shoulder. Recipients entitled to other medals wore the Order's badge mounted on their medal groups.

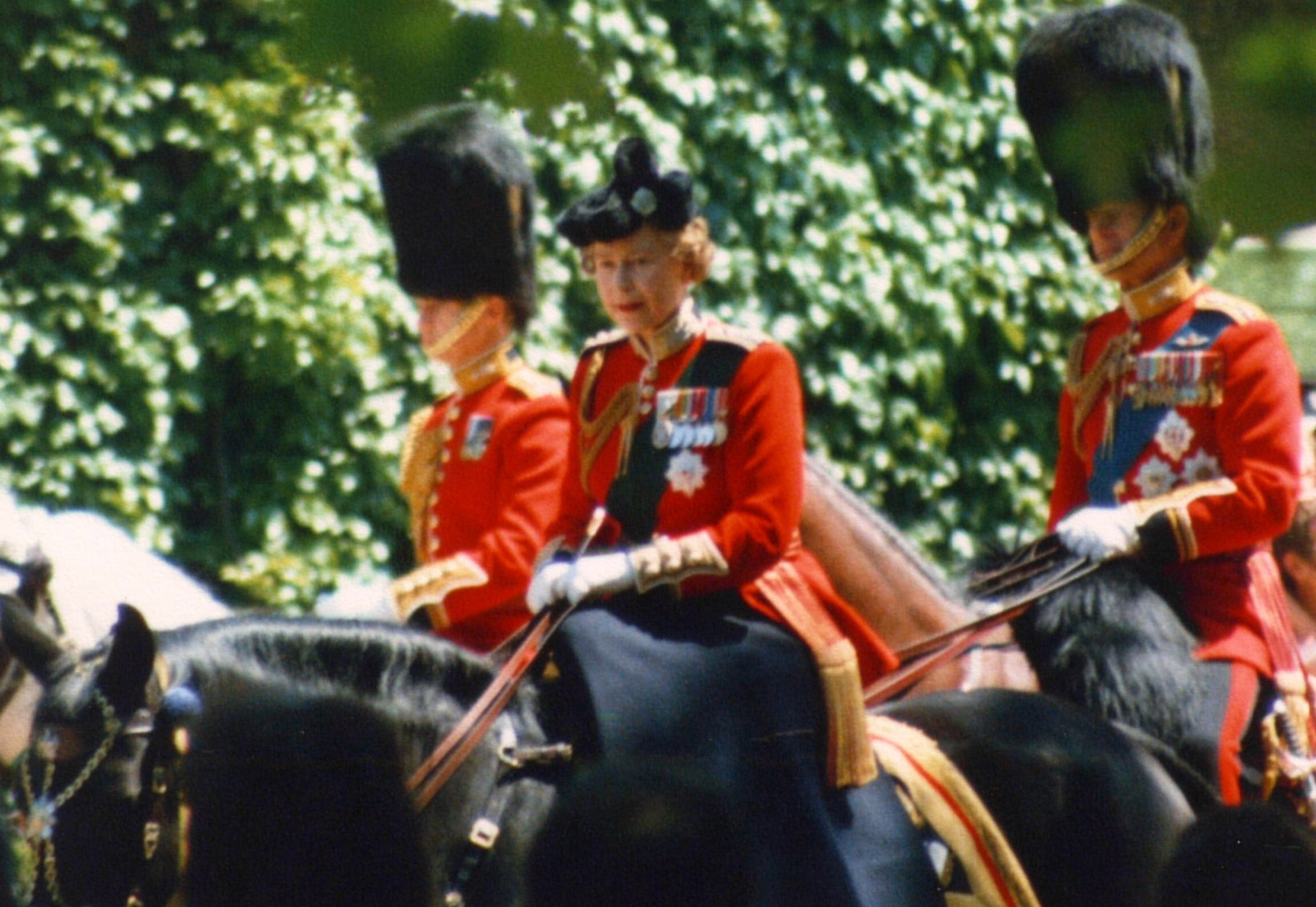
Elizabeth II, in her uniform as Colonel-in-Chief of the Scots Guards, wears the badge of the order as a medal (first on left). (Trooping the Colour, 1986)

== Recipients ==
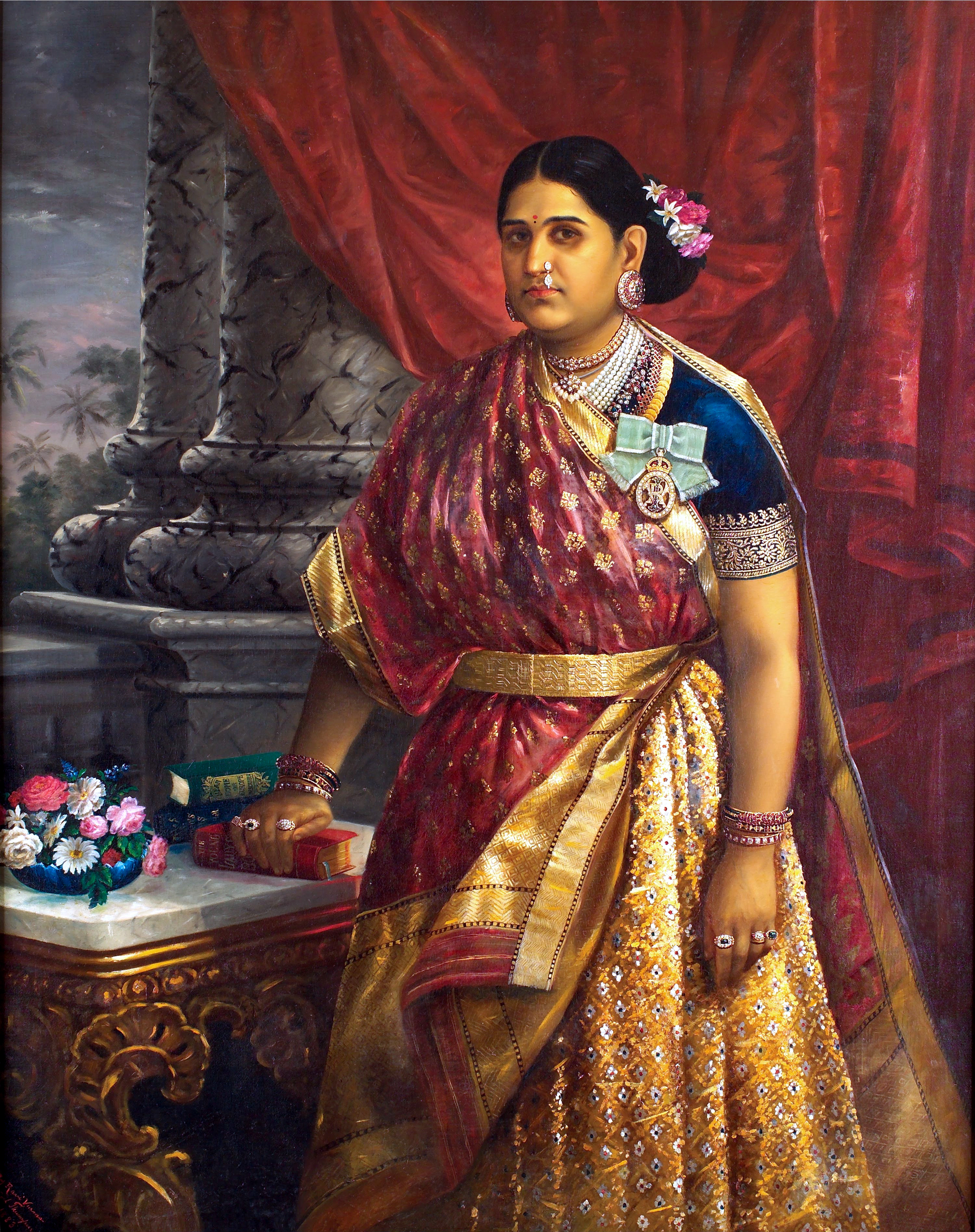
Bharani Thirunal Lakshmi Bayi of Travancore wearing the badge and ribbon of the order

=== 1878–1900 ===
- 1878: Alexandra, Princess of Wales
- 1878: Victoria, Princess Royal, Crown Princess of Germany
- 1878: The Princess Alice of the United Kingdom, Grand Duchess of Hesse and by Rhine
- 1878: The Princess Helena, Princess Christian of Schleswig-Holstein
- 1878: The Princess Louise, Marchioness of Lorne
- 1878: The Princess Beatrice of the United Kingdom
- 1878: Grand Duchess Maria Alexandrovna of Russia, Duchess of Edinburgh
- 1878: Princess Augusta of Hesse-Kassel, Duchess of Cambridge
- 1878: Princess Augusta of Cambridge, Grand Duchess of Mecklenburg-Strelitz
- 1878: Princess Mary Adelaide of Cambridge, Duchess of Teck
- 1878: Maharani Bamba Singh
- 1878: Sultan Shah Jahan, Begum of Bhopal
- 1878: Maharani Sita Vilas Dawaji Ammani Anaro of Mysore
- 1878: Maharanee Jumnabai Sahib Gaekwad of Baroda (widow of Maharaja Khanderao)
- 1878: Dilawar un-Nisa Begum Sahiba, of Hyderabad
- 1878: Nawab Qudsia, Begum of Bhopal
- 1878: Vijaya Mohana Muktamba Bai Ammani Raja Sahib of Tanjore
- 1878: Maharani Swarnamoyee of Cossimbazar
- 1878: Elizabeth Campbell, Duchess of Argyll
- 1878: Georgina Gascoyne-Cecil, Marchioness of Salisbury
- 1878: Henrietta Anne Theodosia Vyner, Marchioness of Ripon, Vicereine of India
- 1878: Lady Mary Temple-Nugent-Brydges-Chandos-Grenville
- 1878: Mary Bruce, Countess of Elgin
- 1878: Blanche Julia Wyndham, Countess of Mayo
- 1878: Lady Susan Georgiana Bourke, elder daughter of James Broun-Ramsay, 1st Marquess of Dalhousie, Governor-General from 1848 to 1856
- 1878: Mary Wood, Viscountess Halifax
- 1878: Lady Hobart (Mary Hobart, wife of Lord Hobart, Governor of the Presidency of Madras)
- 1878: Lady Jane Baring, daughter of Thomas Baring, 1st Earl of Northbrook, who had acted as her father's Viceregal hostess in India from 1872 to 1876.
- 1878: Anne Napier, Baroness Napier (wife of Francis Napier, 10th Lord Napier, Governor of the Presidency of Madras, 1866–1872)
- 1878: Edith Bulwer-Lytton, Countess of Lytton
- 1878: Harriette Lawrence, Baroness Lawrence
- 1878: Cecilia Northcote, Countess of Iddesleigh
- 1878: Catherine Frere, Lady Frere (wife of Sir Henry Bartle Frere, 1st Baronet, Governor of the Presidency of Bombay)
- 1878: Mary Temple, Lady Temple (wife of Sir Richard Temple, 1st Baronet, Governor of the Presidency of Bombay)
- 1878: Caroline Denison, Lady Denison (wife of Sir William Denison, Governor of the Presidency of Madras)
- 1878: Katherine Strachey, Lady Strachey (wife of Sir John Strachey, acting Viceroy of India 1872)
- 1879: Jane Gathorne-Hardy, Countess of Cranbrook
- 1879: Princess Frederica of Hanover
- 1879: Princess Marie of Hanover
- 1879: Princess Thyra of Denmark, Duchess of Cumberland
- 1879: Princess Louise Margaret of Prussia, Duchess of Connaught
- 1879: Lady Napier of Magdala (wife of Robert Napier, 1st Baron Napier of Magdala, Commander-in-Chief, India 1870–1876 and acting Viceroy of India, 1862–1863)
- 1879: Lady Frances Cunynghame
- 1879: Dowager Lady Pottinger (widow of Sir Henry Pottinger, Governor of the Presidency of Madras 1848–1854)
- 1881: Bharani Thirunal Lakshmi Bayi, Senior Rani of Attingal
- 1881: Lady Fergusson (Olive Fergusson, wife of Sir James Fergusson, 6th Baronet, Governor of the Presidency of Bombay, 1880–1885)
- 1881: Mrs William Patrick Adam (Emily Adam, widow of William Patrick Adam, Governor of the Presidency of Madras 1880–1881)
- 1882: Princess Helen of Waldeck and Pyrmont, Duchess of Albany
- 1883: Lady Grant Duff (Anna Julia Grant Duff, wife of Sir Mountstuart Grant Duff, Governor of the Presidency of Madras 1881–1886)
- 1884: Edith Fergusson (daughter of Sir James Fergusson, 6th Baronet, Governor of the Presidency of Bombay, 1880–1885)
- 1884: Hariot Hamilton-Temple-Blackwood, Countess of Dufferin (wife of Frederick Hamilton-Temple-Blackwood, Earl of Dufferin, Viceroy of India, 1884–1888)
- 1885: Lady Randolph Spencer-Churchill (wife of Lord Randolph Churchill, Secretary of State for India, 1885–1886)
- 1885: Lady Reay (Fanny Georgiana Jane Mackay, wife of Donald Mackay, 11th Lord Reay, Governor of the Presidency of Bombay 1885–1890)
- 1886: Viscountess Cross (Georgina Cross, wife of Richard Assheton Cross, 1st Viscount Cross, Secretary of State for India 1886–1892)
- 1887: Princess Louise of Wales
- 1887: Princess Victoria of Wales
- 1887: Princess Maud of Wales
- 1887: Maharanee Sunity Devee of Cooch Behar
- 1888: Maud Petty-Fitzmaurice, Marchioness of Lansdowne, Vicereine of India
- 1889: Princess Helena Victoria of Schleswig-Holstein
- 1889: Princess Victoria Mary of Teck
- 1890: Lady Harris (Lucy Ada Harris, wife of George Harris, 4th Baron Harris, Governor of the Presidency of Bombay, 1890–1895)
- 1891: Maharanee Sakhiabai Raje Sahib Scindia Bahadur, Regent of Gwalior (widow of Maharaja Sir Jayajirao Scindia Bahadur)
- 1891: Lady Wenlock (Constance Mary Lawley, wife of Beilby Lawley, 3rd Baron Wenlock, Governor of the Presidency of Madras 1891–1896)
- 1892: Maharanee Chimnabai Sahib Gaekwad of Baroda (wife of Maharaja Sayajirao Gaekwad III)
- 1892: Lady Nandkuverbai Bhagvatsinh Jadeja, Rani Sahib of Gondal
- 1893: Maharani Kempananjammanni Devi of Mysore (wife of Maharaja Chamaraja Wodeyar X)
- 1893: Marie, Crown Princess of Romania
- 1893: Princess Victoria Melita of Saxe-Coburg and Gotha
- 1893: Princess Aribert of Anhalt
- 1894: Constance Bruce, Countess of Elgin (wife of Victor Bruce, 9th Earl of Elgin, Viceroy of India, 1894–1899)
- 1895: Mrs Henry Fowler (Ellen Fowler, wife of Henry Fowler, later Viscount Wolverhampton, Secretary of State for India, 1894–1895)
- 1895: Victoria Spencer, Lady Sandhurst (wife of William Mansfield, 1st Baron Sandhurst, later Viscount Sandhurst, Governor of the Presidency of Bombay, 1895–1900)
- 1895: Lady George Hamilton (wife of Lord George Hamilton, Secretary of State for India, 1895–1903)
- 1897: Alexandra, Hereditary Princess of Hohenlohe-Langenburg
- 1897: Maharani Sahiba of Udaipur (wife of Maharajadhiraja Fateh Singh)
- 1897: Nawab Shamsi Jahan, Begum Sahiba of Murshidabad
- 1897: Anne Havelock, Lady Havelock (wife of Sir Arthur Havelock, Governor of the Presidency of Madras, 1896–1900)
- 1899: Mary Curzon, Baroness Curzon of Kedleston, Vicereine of India
- 1900: Princess Margaret of Connaught
- 1900: Alice Stephen, Lady Northcote (wife of Henry Northcote, 1st Baron Northcote, Governor of the Presidency of Bombay, 1900–1903)
- 1900: Nora Henrietta Bews, Lady Roberts (wife of Frederick Roberts, Baron Roberts, Commander-in-Chief, India 1885–1893)
- 1900: Marina Katherine Stewart, Lady Stewart (widow of General Sir Donald Stewart, 1st Baronet, Commander-in-Chief, India 1881–1885)
- 1900: Amelia Maria White, Lady White (wife of General Sir George White, Commander-in-Chief, India 1893–1898)
- 1900: Lady Mary Katharine Lockhart (née Eccles; widow of General Sir William Stephen Alexander Lockhart, Commander-in-Chief, India, 1898–1900)
- 1900: Lady Ampthill (wife of Arthur Russell, 2nd Baron Ampthill, Governor of the Presidency of Madras, 1900–1905)

=== 1901–1947 ===
Tara Devi, the Maharani of Jammu and Kashmir

- 1909: Mary Elliot-Murray-Kynynmound, Countess of Minto (wife of Gilbert Elliot-Murray-Kynynmound, 4th Earl of Minto, Viceroy of India, 1905–1910)
- 1910: Winifred Hardinge, Baroness Hardinge of Penshurst (wife of Charles Hardinge, 1st Baron Hardinge of Penshurst, Viceroy of India, 1910–1916)
- 1911: Princess Patricia of Connaught (Coronation of George V)
- 1911: Princess Charlotte of Prussia, Duchess of Saxe-Meiningen (Coronation of George V)
- 1911: Margaret Primrose, Marchioness of Crewe (wife of Robert Crewe-Milnes, 1st Marquess of Crewe, Secretary of State for India, 1910–1911)
- 1911: Kaikhusrau Jahan, Begum of Bhopal
- 1911: Maharani Sri Nundkanvarba of Bhavnagar
- 1916: Frances Thesiger, Viscountess Chelmsford (wife of Frederic Thesiger, 1st Viscount Chelmsford, Viceroy of India, 1916–1921)
- 1917: Marie Freeman-Thomas, Baroness Willingdon (wife of Freeman Freeman-Thomas, 1st Baron Willingdon, later Marquess of Willingdon, Governor of the Presidency of Bombay, 1913–1918; Governor of the Presidency of Madras, 1919–1924; Viceroy of India, 1931–1936)
- 1918: Maji Sahiba Girraj Kuar, Maharani of Bharatpur, Regent of Bharatpur, 1900–1918
- 1919: The Princess Mary of the United Kingdom
- 1921: Alice Isaacs, Countess of Reading, Vicereine of India
- 1926: Dorothy Wood, Lady Irwin (wife of Edward Frederick Lindley Wood, 1st Baron Irwin, later Earl of Halifax, Viceroy of India, 1926–1931)
- 1927: Pamela Frances Audrey Chichele-Plowden, Countess of Lytton (wife of Victor Bulwer-Lytton, 2nd Earl of Lytton, Viceroy of India, 1925–1926)
- 1928: Shrimati Chinkuraja Scindia, Senior Maharani of Gwalior
- 1929: Puradam Thirunal Sethu Lakshmi Bayi, Regent Maharani of Travancore
- 1930: Margaret Evelyn, Viscountess Goschen (wife of George Goschen, 2nd Viscount Goschen, Governor of Madras 1924–29)
- 1930: Lady Birdwood (wife of William Birdwood, 1st Baron Birdwood, Commander-in-Chief, India 1925–1930)
- 1931: Elizabeth, Duchess of York
- 1932: Begum Mariam Sultana, Lady Ali Shah (widow of Aga Khan II)
- 1935: Maharani Bhatianiji Sri Ajab Kanwarji Sahib, of Bikaner
- 1935: Lady Beatrix Taylour Stanley
- 1936: Doreen Hope, Marchioness of Linlithgow, Vicereine of India
- 1937: Alice, Duchess of Gloucester
- 1937: Princess Marina of Greece and Denmark, Duchess of Kent
- 1937: Doreen Knatchbull, Lady Brabourne
- 1943: Eugenie Marie Quirk, Viscountess Wavell (wife of Archibald Wavell, Viscount Wavell, later Earl Wavell, Viceroy of India, 1943–1947)
- 1945: Mrs Leopold Stennett Amery (Florence Amery, wife of Leopold Stennett Amery, war-time Secretary of State for India, 1940–1945)
- 1946: Maharani Tara Devi of Jammu and Kashmir
- 1947: Edwina, Viscountess Mountbatten of Burma, Vicereine of India
- 1947: The Princess Elizabeth of the United Kingdom
- 1947: The Princess Margaret of the United Kingdom
- 1947: Agnes Anne, Baroness Clydesmuir (wife of John Colville, 1st Baron Clydesmuir, Governor of the Presidency of Bombay)

== Sources ==
- The India List and India Office List. Harrison and sons. 1905.
