= St Mary's Church, Ticehurst =

St Mary's, Ticehurst
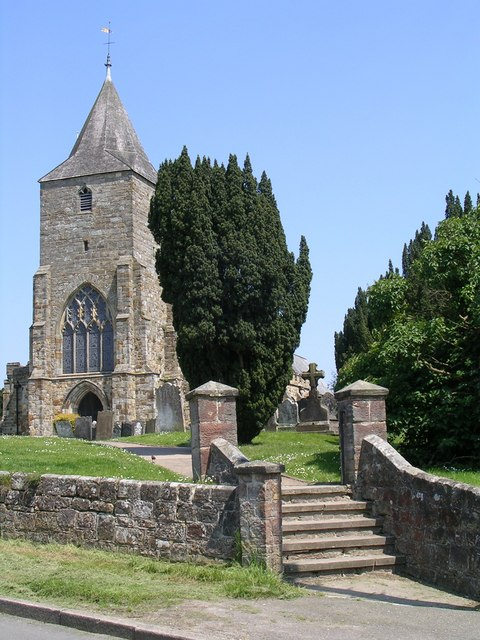
- St Mary's, Ticehurst
- 51.0454°N 0.4078°E
- Denomination: Church of England
- Churchmanship: Central Churchmanship
- Website: St Mary the Virgin church, Ticehurst

History
- Dedication: St Mary

Administration
- Province: Canterbury
- Diocese: Chichester
- Archdeaconry: Hastings
- Deanery: Rotherfield
- Parish: Ticehurst

Clergy
- Vicar: Fr Jason Radcliff

St Mary's Church is a 14th-century parish church dedicated to St Mary the Virgin in Ticehurst, East Sussex, England. Part of the Diocese of Chichester, the church has grade II* listed building status. In the church is a brass memorial to John Wyborne and his wives Cecily and Agnes, from about 1365.

The hymnwriter Francis Pott served as parish priest at Ticehurst from 1861 to 1866.

In 1978 St Mary's Ticehurst and the neighbouring St Augustine's Flimwell were pastorally re-organized into a United Benefice.

== History ==
=== Early history ===
The earliest written evidence of a church at Ticehurst is a reference to 'Adam, Presbyter de Tychenherste' in a document dated 1180 and portions of the building date as early as the 13th century as identified by the faces of the tower, but since then there has been significant restoration and alteration.

=== The 19th Century ===
In the late 19th Century crenellations were added to the side walls, porch and turret. In 1856 the chancel was rebuilt from nearly ground level. The sanctuary has two notable stained glass windows: the north window contains medieval glass taken from the original east window and depicts a ‘doom’ while the present east window dates to 1879, the central light of which won a prize at the Paris exhibition of 1878.

=== Rev. Arthur Eden ===
Father Eden's incumbency (1851–1908) was a significant point in the parish's history, rebuilding and reshaping for the future. After serving a curacy in Kent, Father Eden was instituted into the office on 16 July 1851 and inducted nine days later and 'for over 57 years he lived and laboured at Ticehurst and gained the respect and affection of his parishioners, in whose secular as well as spiritual affairs he took the greatest interest.' He rebuilt the interior of the church from nearly ground level in 1856 due to significant deterioration and neglect by previous vicars. Shortly after his arrival in the parish Father Eden arranged to have a new vicarage built.

Father Eden was a devoted pastor to the people of Ticehurst and deeply involved in the life of the village, serving with several local organizations in administrative positions. As a priest, Father Eden was equally committed to his parishioners and, though he had the regular help of his curates, Father Eden took 1,826 baptisms, 1,344 funerals, and 453 marriages himself during his incumbency.

Father Eden died in office on 17 November 1908 and was buried in the churchyard on 21 November surrounded by many loving parishioners and friends, whose sentiments can, no doubt, be summarized by the following lines written about him by parishioner William J. Courthope, sometime Professor of Poetry at Oxford:

Earth unto Earth! To him we lay below.
Dear was the earth with which his ashes blend.
Here, through his life, he never made a foe;
Here, till his death, he never lost a friend.
Where from his youth he watched his living sheep,
Or closed their dying eyes, in hallowed ground
The Shepherd lies, and waits his call from sleep
Among his folder flock that slumber round.
Pastor and patriot, by their suffering bed
For half a hundred years his face was known:
Their upward steps in Duty's path he led,
Shared all their joys, and made their griefs his own.
Earth unto earth returns! Forbear to grieve!
Fresh as the flowers his Spirit breathes above,
Shrined in the memories Faith and Friendship leave,
Safe in the bosom of Eternal Love.

The west window in the bell tower depicts the four evangelists, however as the face of St Mark had faded badly, it was renewed in 1984 by inserting that of the parish's beloved Father Eden.

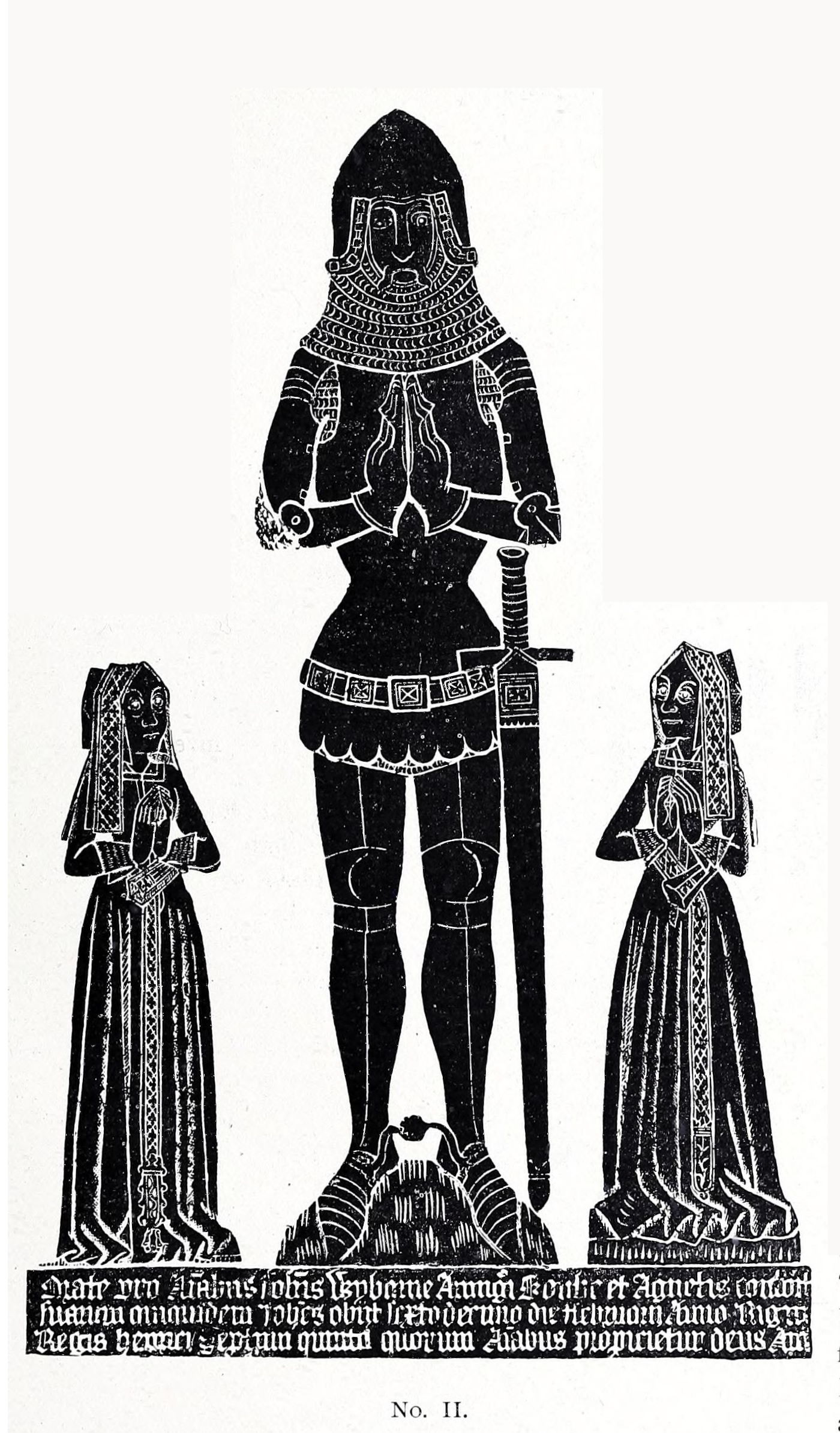
Monumental brass of John Wyborne and his wives Cecily and Agnes (published 1901)

=== Notable interior decorations and items ===
The north chapel–which is used for weekday Communion services and the Daily Office–has many memorials to the Courthope family (and is named after them), while the south chapel (since deconsecrated) now contains the organ, erected in 1909.

=== 20th century ===
The decoration of the interior of the church was redesigned by the famous Anglo-Catholic/Ritualist artist Martin Travers in 1945 and completed in 1947 under the incumbency of Father Owen Allan Sharpe Edwards. The project was donated by Mrs. Margeret Terry in memory of her father, the Revd Francis Fitzgerald Hort (1868–1942) and her brother the Revd Anthony Gilbert Hort (1916–44) and included an extension of the high altar and the construction of matching altar rails, two tall candlesticks, a set of altar frontals, and a memorial hatchment on the south wall of the sanctuary. The most striking aspect, however, is without question the altar reredos, a triptych depicting the Annunciation with a central panel of Christ blessing the people, holding a chalice, and trompe l'oeil effects on either side. It was one of the last to be completed directly by his hand, with other projects in Sussex having to be completed by his assistants due to his ill health and death.

Father Timothy Mills, vicar for the early part of the 21st century, led a major building project–the 'St Mary's Room' which was completed in 2010–a modern parish hall built on the south end of the church in the original style containing facilities, a kitchen, modern a/v equipment, and underfloor heating. The St Mary's Room is used variously by the congregation for church activities and the parish for community activities; it is also a consecrated chapel and used by the church for weekday services in the colder months.

Under the incumbency of Father Ashley Evans, St Mary’s became holders of the Eco Church Gold Award (2022) as well as being awarded Animal Friendly Church of the Year 2020 (joint winner, awarded by ASWA).

Father Jason Robert Radcliff SSC was instituted and inducted on 23 July 2025, having come from The Episcopal Diocese of Albany, USA.

== Incumbents of Ticehurst ==
1180 Adam, Presbyter of Tychenerste (Patron: Walter de Scotney)

1266 William att Mulle (Patron: Hasting Priory)

1332 Thomas (Patron: Hasting Priory)

1358 Richard Chalkepole (Patron: Hasting Priory)

1365 Robert Poyntel (Patron: Hasting Priory)

1417 William Haytoun (Patron: Warbleton Priory)

1439 John Dygonson (Patron: Warbleton Priory)

1439 William Martyn (Patron: Warbleton Priory)

1440 William Stykeland (Patron: Warbleton Priory)

1444 John Syde (Patron: Warbleton Priory)

1479 John Ewer (Patron: Warbleton Priory)

1479 John Pensell (Patron: Warbleton Priory)

1506 John Eggerton (Patron: Warbleton Priory)

1535 Thomas Cowley (Patron: Warbleton Priory)

1543 John Greye (Patron: Dean & Chapter of Canterbury)

1546 John Mylls (Patron: Dean & Chapter of Canterbury)

1555 Bartholomew Inkpen (Patron: Dean & Chapter of Canterbury)

1563 John Wharton (Patron: Dean & Chapter of Canterbury)

1584 John Leaver (Patron: Dean & Chapter of Canterbury)

1612 Dr Hull (Patron: Dean & Chapter of Canterbury)

1614 Samuel Beyley, A.M. (Patron: Dean & Chapter of Canterbury)

1636 Thomas Westly, D.D. (Patron: Dean & Chapter of Canterbury)

1639 John Jeffries, S.T.P. (Patron: Dean & Chapter of Canterbury)

1643 John Wright and Whitby ('Intruders during the Commonwealth')

1643 Gabriel Eagles (Patron: Dean & Chapter of Canterbury)

1660 John Callowe, B.A. (Patron: Dean & Chapter of Canterbury)

1681 William Wayne (Patron: Dean & Chapter of Canterbury)

1718 Thomas Lord, A.M. (Patron: Dean & Chapter of Canterbury)

1729 John Harris, S.T.P Bishop of Llandaff and Dean of Wells (Patron: Dean & Chapter of Canterbury)

1739 Ossory Medlicott, M.A. (Patron: Dean & Chapter of Canterbury)

1770 David Durell, D.D. (Patron: Dean & Chapter of Canterbury)

1776 Christophe Gawthrop, B.D. (Patron: Dean & Chapter of Canterbury)

1792 George Berkeley, D.C.L. (Patron: Dean & Chapter of Canterbury)

1795 William Welfitt, D.D. (Patron: Dean & Chapter of Canterbury)

1833 Hon. John Evelyn Boscawen, M.A. (Patron: Dean & Chapter of Canterbury)

1851 Arthur Eden, M.A. (Patron: Dean & Chapter of Canterbury)

1909 George Holmes Gray, M.A. (Patron: Dean & Chapter of Canterbury)

1921 Edwin Langley, M.A. (Patron: Dean & Chapter of Canterbury)

1936 Owen Allan Sharpe Edwards, M.A. (Patron: Sir George Loyd Courthope, M.C.; Rt. Hon. George Loyd Barton Courthope, P.C., M.C.; Hon. Beryl and Daphne Courthope)

1951 Frank Joseph Law, L.C.D, R.D. (Patron: Sir George Loyd Courthope, M.C.; Rt. Hon. George Loyd Barton Courthope, P.C., M.C.; Hon. Beryl and Daphne Courthope)

1967 William Gregory, L.R.A.M (Patron: Hon. Daphne Courthope; John Hardcastle; Bishop of Chichester joint with Flimwell)

1971 John Norman, M.A. (Patron: Hon. Daphne Courthope; John Hardcastle)

1975 William Haigh Prudom (Patron: John Hardcastle; Bishop of Chichester, joint with Flimwell)

1981 Benjamin Clive Williams, B.A. (Patron: John Hardcastle; Bishop of Chichester, joint with Flimwell)

1990 Roy John Goodchild (Patron: John Hardcastle; Francis Drewe; Bishop of Chichester, joint with Flimwell)

2006 Timothy John Mills (Patron: James Sellick; Keith Miller; Bishop of Chichester, joint with Flimwell)

2017 Ashley Edwards (Patron: James Sellick; Keith Miller; Bishop of Chichester, joint with Flimwell)

2025 Jason Robert Radcliff SSC, M.A., Ph.D. (Patron: Angela Sellick; John Pilcher; Bishop of Chichester, joint with Flimwell)

== See also ==
- List of places of worship in Rother
