= Old Stagers =

Amateur theatre group

The Old Stagers (OS) is an amateur theatre group, founded in 1842 by Hon. Frederick Ponsonby (later Earl of Bessborough) to perform during Kent's annual Canterbury Cricket Week. Originally the Canterbury Old Stagers, it took its current name in 1851. It claims to be the oldest surviving amateur dramatic company in the world, having staged its first shows in Canterbury in 1842. It has continued to give annual performances since (with intermissions for the two World Wars and the Covid Pandemic of 2020-21). It now stages its plays at the Malthouse Theatre in Canterbury.

The Old Stagers has close links to Kent County Cricket Club and the I Zingari nomadic amateur cricket club. Ponsonby was also a founder of I Zingari, and later became president of Surrey County Cricket Club. One of the earliest Old Stagers was the Kent and England cricketer Alfred Mynn who first appeared in 1847 and then regularly until his death in 1861. William Henry Goschen (1870-1943) was also a member of both I Zingari and the Old Stagers.

Old Stagers Amateur Dramatic Society records, including programmes, newspaper reviews and photographs of productions from 1842 to 2003, are archived at Canterbury Cathedral Library as item U449.
