= Devadhanam, Tiruchirappalli district =

Devathanam
- Town
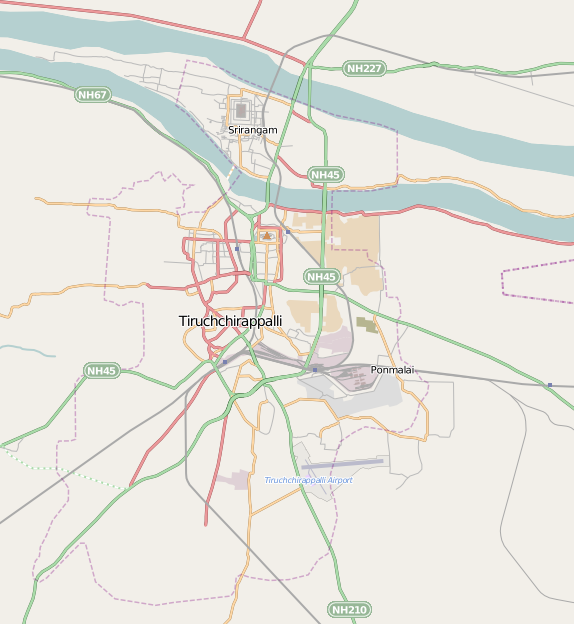
- Devathanam, Tiruchirappalli district, Tamil Nadu
- Coordinates: 10.8249°N 78.7016°E
- Country: India
- State: Tamil Nadu
- District: Tiruchirappalli
- Elevation: 95.35 m (312.8 ft)

Languages
  - Official: Tamil, English
  - Speech: Tamil, English
- Time zone: UTC+5:30 (IST)
- PIN: 620002
- Telephone code: +91431*******
- Vehicle registration: TN - 81 ** xxxx
- Other Neighbourhoods: Tiruchirappalli, Singarathope, Palakkarai
- Corporation: Tiruchirappalli City Corporation

Devathanam is a town located at the back side of the Rockfort in Tiruchirappalli district. Regional Transport Office Tiruchirappalli East is located here and Registration Number TN-81.
