= Flimwell =

Village in East Sussex, England

Coordinates: 51°03′16″N 0°26′45″E

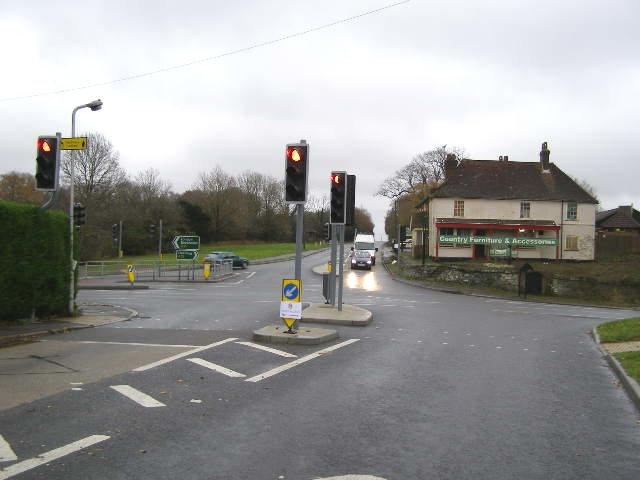
- Flimwell Crossing, East Sussex

- Location within East Sussex
- OS grid reference: TQ715312
  - London: 39 miles (63 km) NW
- Civil parish: Ticehurst
- District: Rother
- Shire county: East Sussex
- Region: South East
- Country: England
- Sovereign state: United Kingdom
- Post town: WADHURST
- Postcode district: TN5
- Dialling code: 01580
- Police: Sussex
- Fire: East Sussex
- Ambulance: South East Coast
- UK Parliament: Bexhill and Battle
- Website: N/A

Flimwell is a village in the civil parish of Ticehurst, in the Rother district of East Sussex, England. It is located close to the border with Kent at the junction of the A21 road with the A268 and the B2087. The village is situated in an Area of Outstanding Natural Beauty near Bewl Water and Bedgebury Pinetum, and neighbouring villages include Ticehurst, Hurst Green and Hawkhurst.

The origin of the place-name is from the Old English words fliema and wella meaning the spring of the fugitives. The placename appears as Flimenwelle in 1210.

The village is linear in shape and the largest of a group of settlements, some of which contain large residential properties, to both the west and east of the A21. Other settlements are Union Street and Dale Hill to the west, and Seacox Heath to the east. Including the surrounding woods and fields, Flimwell covers an area of approximately 1.35 square miles (3.5 km^{2}), of which only approximately 5% is built-up.

A new village hall was completed in 2020. There are a number of businesses & facilities in and around the village, including an award-winning smokery and wine store, pub, motel, pine furniture shop, church, cricket ground with pavilion, playground, a park with a café and offices, and various other businesses.

Flimwell parish church is dedicated to St Augustine of Canterbury.

In the 16th century, Flimwell was one of the stages on the post road from London to Rye.

On the eastern edge of the village lies Seacox Heath, a dacha owned by the Russian Embassy and used by its staff. Built in 1871 by architects Carpenter and Slater, it is a Grade II listed building in the style of a French chateau. The dacha was the subject of news reports in 1999, when dogs from the estate were said to have 'killed approx. 50 ewes and attacked 100 others'. The British Government is considering gifting the property to the Ukrainian Government as compensation for the 2022 Russian invasion of Ukraine.
