= Listed buildings in Ticehurst =

Civil Parish in East Sussex, England

Ticehurst is village and civil parish in the Rother district of East Sussex, England. It contains one grade I, four grade II* and 152 grade II listed buildings that are recorded in the National Heritage List for England.

This list is based on the information retrieved online from Historic England

== Listing ==
Name	Grade	Location	Type	Completed (Note: The date given is the date used by Historic England as significant for the initial building or that of an important part in the structure's description.)	Date designated	Grid ref. (Note: The grid reference is based on the British national grid reference system, sometimes known as OSGB36, used by the Ordnance Survey.) Geo-coordinates	Notes	Entry number (Note: The "List Entry Number" is a unique number assigned to each listed building and scheduled monument by Historic England.)	Image	Wikidata
Bardown	II	Bardown Road			3 August 1961	TQ6630329064; 51°02′13″N 0°22′14″E		1222086	Upload Photo	Q26516440
Barn at Maplesden to the North East of the House	II	Bardown Road			13 May 1987	TQ6533228902; 51°02′09″N 0°21′24″E		1222248	Upload Photo	Q26516594
Bricklehurst Manor School	II	Bardown Road			13 May 1987	TQ6593229270; 51°02′20″N 0°21′55″E		1222245	Upload Photo	Q26516590
Cooper's Farmhouse	II	Bardown Road			13 May 1987	TQ6634728685; 51°02′00″N 0°22′16″E		1222244	Upload Photo	Q26516589
Maplesden	II	Bardown Road			3 August 1961	TQ6530628885; 51°02′08″N 0°21′23″E		1222087	Upload Photo	Q26516441
Normanswood	II	Bardown Road			13 May 1987	TQ6540330156; 51°02′49″N 0°21′30″E		1222088	Upload Photo	Q26516442
Clayhall Cottage Little Ale House	II	Battenhurst Road			13 May 1987	TQ6766827854; 51°01′32″N 0°23′22″E		1222090	Upload Photo	Q26516444
Eatonden Manor Farmhouse	II	Battenhurst Road			3 August 1961	TQ6793226760; 51°00′57″N 0°23′34″E		1222251	Upload Photo	Q26516597
Old Battenhurst Farmhouse	II	Battenhurst Road			13 May 1987	TQ6769427075; 51°01′07″N 0°23′22″E		1222089	Upload Photo	Q26516443
Numbers 1 (Lyndhurst), 2 and 3 Millhill Cottages	II	1, 2 and 3, Berner's Hill			13 May 1987	TQ7009030913; 51°03′09″N 0°25′32″E		1274734	Upload Photo	Q26564376
Chorley Cottage Greystones	II	Berner's Hill			13 May 1987	TQ7008830878; 51°03′07″N 0°25′31″E		1222270	Upload Photo	Q26516613
Fernbank	II	Berner's Hill			13 May 1987	TQ7015430948; 51°03′10″N 0°25′35″E		1274733	Upload Photo	Q26564375
Montrose Rosedene	II	Berner's Hill			28 May 1986	TQ7012530924; 51°03′09″N 0°25′33″E		1222269	Upload Photo	Q26516612
Birchett's Green	II	Birchett's Green Lane			13 May 1987	TQ6677731296; 51°03′24″N 0°22′42″E		1222273	Upload Photo	Q26516616
Lower Tolhurst	II	Birchett's Green Lane			1 October 1986	TQ6739131045; 51°03′16″N 0°23′13″E		1274736	Upload Photo	Q26564378
Two Oasthouses and Granary at Upper Tolhurst to the South of the Farmhouse	II	Birchett's Green Lane			13 May 1987	TQ6722230848; 51°03′09″N 0°23′04″E		1222272	Upload Photo	Q26516615
Upper Tolhurst	II	Birchett's Green Lane			13 May 1987	TQ6726230906; 51°03′11″N 0°23′06″E		1222271	Upload Photo	Q26516614
Boarders Farmhouse	II	Boarders Lane			13 May 1987	TQ6810831319; 51°03′24″N 0°23′50″E		1222274	Upload Photo	Q26516617
Burnt Lodge	II	Burnt Lodge Lane			13 May 1987	TQ6771231133; 51°03′18″N 0°23′30″E		1274737	Upload Photo	Q26564379
Rowley	II	Burnt Lodge Lane			13 May 1987	TQ6787131459; 51°03′29″N 0°23′39″E		1222275	Upload Photo	Q26516618
Gable End	II	7, Church Street			13 May 1987	TQ6879630101; 51°02′44″N 0°24′24″E		1222281	Upload Photo	Q26516624
17, 18, 19 and 20, Church Street	II	17, 18, 19 and 20 , Church Street			3 August 1961	TQ6883130137; 51°02′45″N 0°24′26″E		1222350	17, 18, 19 and 20, Church Street More images	Q26516687
21, 22, 23, 24 and 25, Church Street	II	21, 22, 23, 24 and 25, Church Street			3 August 1961	TQ6885230161; 51°02′46″N 0°24′27″E		1222282	21, 22, 23, 24 and 25, Church Street More images	Q26516625
1 and 2, Clare House and C Leach, Greengrocer	II	Church Street			13 May 1987	TQ6886730190; 51°02′46″N 0°24′28″E		1222283	Upload Photo	Q26516626
Church Gate Cottage and Church Gate House	II	Church Street			13 May 1987	TQ6885530138; 51°02′45″N 0°24′27″E		1274739	Church Gate Cottage and Church Gate House More images	Q26564381
Church House	II	Church Street			13 May 1987	TQ6880730046; 51°02′42″N 0°24′24″E		1274741	Church House More images	Q26564383
Cinque Cottage	II	Church Street			13 May 1987	TQ6880830095; 51°02′43″N 0°24′24″E		1222342	Cinque Cottage More images	Q26516680
Cooper's Stores	II	Church Street			3 August 1961	TQ6888530171; 51°02′46″N 0°24′28″E		1222278	Cooper's Stores More images	Q26516621
Holgate House	II	Church Street			13 May 1987	TQ6889230195; 51°02′47″N 0°24′29″E		1222279	Holgate House More images	Q26516622
Hurst Cottage	II	Church Street			13 May 1987	TQ6880829950; 51°02′39″N 0°24′24″E		1274691	Upload Photo	Q26564339
Northgate House	II	Church Street			3 August 1961	TQ6886030172; 51°02′46″N 0°24′27″E		1222356	Northgate House More images	Q26516692
Romany Cottage	II	Church Street			13 May 1987	TQ6880930084; 51°02′43″N 0°24′24″E		1222280	Romany Cottage More images	Q26516623
Roundels	II	Church Street			13 May 1987	TQ6543526864; 51°01′02″N 0°21′26″E		1237651	Upload Photo	Q26530774
The Art Bunch, The Fords and New House	II	Church Street			3 August 1961	TQ6888730241; 51°02′48″N 0°24′29″E		1237646	The Art Bunch, The Fords and New House More images	Q26530769
The Parish Church of St Mary	II*	Church Street			3 August 1961	TQ6887930101; 51°02′44″N 0°24′28″E	Rebuilt in 14th century. North porch added in 15th century, Perpendicular. Brass of a knight, 14th century. In the Courthope chapel various tablets to members of the Family.	1222324	The Parish Church of St Mary More images	Q7594438
The Pharmacy	II	Church Street			13 May 1987	TQ6888930185; 51°02′46″N 0°24′29″E		1274740	The Pharmacy More images	Q26564382
The Schoolmasters House Ticehurst School	II	Church Street			13 May 1987	TQ6885229943; 51°02′38″N 0°24′26″E		1222319	Upload Photo	Q26516659
The Village Stores and Duke Of York	II	Church Street			13 May 1987	TQ6889930205; 51°02′47″N 0°24′29″E		1274559	The Village Stores and Duke Of York More images	Q26564213
Wall and Gate Piers on the West Side of the Garden of the School	II	Church Street			13 May 1987	TQ6882429945; 51°02′39″N 0°24′25″E		1274738	Upload Photo	Q26564380
Beaumans	II	Claphatch Lane			13 May 1987	TQ6740732738; 51°04′10″N 0°23′17″E		1222361	Upload Photo	Q26516697
Beaumans Oast	II	Claphatch Lane			13 May 1987	TQ6748032770; 51°04′11″N 0°23′21″E		1274704	Upload Photo	Q26564351
Claphatch	II	Claphatch Lane			13 May 1987	TQ6717931884; 51°03′43″N 0°23′04″E		1222285	Upload Photo	Q26516628
The Old Farmhouse	II	Claphatch Lane			13 May 1987	TQ6745132780; 51°04′12″N 0°23′19″E		1222284	Upload Photo	Q26516627
Two Oasthouses and Granary at Claphatch to the South West of the House	II	Claphatch Lane			20 May 1976	TQ6714831870; 51°03′43″N 0°23′02″E		1222370	Upload Photo	Q26516703
Cottenden Farmhouse	II	Cottenden Road			13 May 1987	TQ6757228376; 51°01′49″N 0°23′18″E		1222286	Upload Photo	Q26516629
New House Farmhouse	II	Cottenden Road			13 May 1987	TQ6747828404; 51°01′50″N 0°23′13″E		1222373	Upload Photo	Q26516706
Dale Hill Farmhouse	II	Dale Hill			13 May 1987	TQ6989630474; 51°02′55″N 0°25′21″E		1222287	Upload Photo	Q26516630
Old Farm	II	Dale Hill			27 July 2004	TQ6983230588; 51°02′58″N 0°25′18″E		1390981	Upload Photo	Q26670352
The Cherry Tree Public House	II	Dale Hill			13 May 1987	TQ6974730492; 51°02′55″N 0°25′13″E		1274742	Upload Photo	Q26564384
Boundary Farm	II	Hastings Road			13 May 1987	TQ7282629744; 51°02′28″N 0°27′50″E		1222393	Upload Photo	Q26516726
Brookgate Farmhouse	II	Hastings Road			13 May 1987	TQ7289229933; 51°02′34″N 0°27′54″E		1274743	Upload Photo	Q26564385
Two Oasthouses and Granary at Brookgate Farm to the South East of the Farmhouse	II	Hastings Road			13 May 1987	TQ7286529905; 51°02′33″N 0°27′52″E		1222397	Upload Photo	Q26516730
Church of St Augustine of Canterbury	II	Hawkhurst Road			13 May 1987	TQ7246030886; 51°03′05″N 0°27′33″E		1222404	Upload Photo	Q7592535
Keeper's Cottage	II	Hawkhurst Road			1 August 1995	TQ7236530357; 51°02′48″N 0°27′27″E		1274067	Upload Photo	Q26563761
Lodge to Seacox Heath	II	Hawkhurst Road			11 October 1996	TQ7314630779; 51°03′01″N 0°28′08″E		1268266	Upload Photo	Q26558589
Mount Pleasant Farmhouse	II	Hawkhurst Road			13 May 1987	TQ7233430968; 51°03′08″N 0°27′27″E		1222289	Upload Photo	Q26516632
Old Timbers and House Adjoining on the West	II	Hawkhurst Road			13 May 1987	TQ7180731112; 51°03′13″N 0°27′00″E		1222288	Upload Photo	Q26516631
Seacox Cockers Seacox Cottage	II	Hawkhurst Road			13 May 1987	TQ7202831053; 51°03′11″N 0°27′11″E		1222399	Upload Photo	Q26516731
Seacox Heath	II	Hawkhurst Road			13 May 1987	TQ7295530667; 51°02′58″N 0°27′58″E		1274662	Upload Photo	Q26564310
St Augustine's Vicarage	II	Hawkhurst Road			15 October 1986	TQ7240630886; 51°03′05″N 0°27′30″E		1274744	Upload Photo	Q26564386
Bell Cottages	II	1, 2 and 3, High Street			3 August 1961	TQ6893830255; 51°02′48″N 0°24′31″E		1274605	Bell Cottages More images	Q26564257
Apsley Court	II	1-5, High Street			3 August 1961	TQ6895930250; 51°02′48″N 0°24′32″E		1274667	Apsley Court More images	Q26564315
5, 6, 7 and 8, High Street	II	5, 6, 7 and 8, High Street			13 May 1987	TQ6879130287; 51°02′50″N 0°24′24″E		1222439	5, 6, 7 and 8, High Street More images	Q26516772
1 and 2, Cerne Cottage	II	High Street			13 May 1987	TQ6898530167; 51°02′46″N 0°24′34″E		1222443	1 and 2, Cerne Cottage More images	Q26516776
1 and 2, Little Clayhams	II	High Street			13 May 1987	TQ6934630104; 51°02′43″N 0°24′52″E		1237632	Upload Photo	Q26530754
1, 2, 3 and 4, Hazelwood Cottages	II	High Street			13 May 1987	TQ6881030276; 51°02′49″N 0°24′25″E		1274663	1, 2, 3 and 4, Hazelwood Cottages More images	Q26564311
Croft Villa	II	30, High Street			13 May 1987	TQ6885830278; 51°02′49″N 0°24′27″E		1222446	Croft Villa More images	Q26516779
The Surgery	II	31, High Street, 32, High Street			13 May 1987	TQ6884330289; 51°02′50″N 0°24′26″E		1222447	The Surgery More images	Q26516780
36, High Street	II	36, High Street			13 May 1987	TQ6882330291; 51°02′50″N 0°24′25″E		1222575	36, High Street More images	Q26516897
Caxton Cottage, Old Merriams and Beech House	II	High Street			13 May 1987	TQ6886130238; 51°02′48″N 0°24′27″E		1237647	Upload Photo	Q26530770
Clayhams and Clayhams Cottage	II	High Street			13 November 1987	TQ6922330134; 51°02′44″N 0°24′46″E		1238398	Upload Photo	Q26531459
Field	II	High Street			13 May 1987	TQ6884330255; 51°02′49″N 0°24′26″E		1222440	Field More images	Q26516773
The Bull Inn Public House	II	High Street			18 August 1980	TQ6849831098; 51°03′16″N 0°24′10″E		1237702	Upload Photo	Q26530821
The Cottage	II	High Street			13 May 1987	TQ6894030196; 51°02′47″N 0°24′31″E		1274664	The Cottage More images	Q26564312
The Long House	II	High Street			23 December 1986	TQ6900130168; 51°02′46″N 0°24′34″E		1274626	The Long House More images	Q26564276
The Yett	II	High Street			3 August 1961	TQ6896930219; 51°02′47″N 0°24′33″E		1222445	The Yett More images	Q26516778
Westbourne Villa	II	High Street			13 May 1987	TQ6897230177; 51°02′46″N 0°24′33″E		1222442	Upload Photo	Q26516775
Bulter Cottages 2, 3 (Flimel) and 4	II	2, 3 and 4, High Street, Flimwell			13 May 1987	TQ7147631223; 51°03′17″N 0°26′43″E		1274575	Upload Photo	Q26564228
Croft House and Honeysuckle Cottage	II	High Street, Ticehurst			13 May 1987	TQ6881630302; 51°02′50″N 0°24′25″E		1274668	Croft House and Honeysuckle Cottage More images	Q26564316
National Westminster Bank and Ticehurst Bakery	II	High Street, Ticehurst			13 May 1987	TQ6887730269; 51°02′49″N 0°24′28″E		1274606	National Westminster Bank and Ticehurst Bakery More images	Q26564258
Spice Cottage	II	1, High Street, Ticehurst			13 May 1987	TQ6887930250; 51°02′48″N 0°24′28″E		1222441	Spice Cottage More images	Q26516774
The Chequers Public House	II	High Street, Ticehurst			13 May 1987	TQ6900030199; 51°02′47″N 0°24′34″E		1274666	The Chequers Public House More images	Q26564314
Wordsworth House	II	High Street, Ticehurst			13 May 1987	TQ6897930200; 51°02′47″N 0°24′33″E		1222528	Wordsworth House More images	Q26516852
Dunsters Mill House	II*	Huntley Mill Road			3 August 1961	TQ6896231991; 51°03′45″N 0°24′35″E		1222585	Upload Photo	Q17555933
Norwoods Farmhouse	II	Huntley Mill Road			24 April 1987	TQ6900631728; 51°03′36″N 0°24′37″E		1222448	Upload Photo	Q26516781
Birchenwood Cottage	II	Hurst Green Road			13 May 1987	TQ7035029642; 51°02′27″N 0°25′43″E		1222590	Upload Photo	Q26516911
Gibbs Reed Farmhouse	II	Hurst Green Road			13 May 1987	TQ7017529713; 51°02′30″N 0°25′34″E		1274631	Upload Photo	Q26564280
Little Boarzell	II	Hurst Green Road			13 May 1987	TQ7151228812; 51°01′59″N 0°26′41″E		1274585	Upload Photo	Q26564238
Pashley Manor	I	Hurst Green Road			3 August 1961	TQ7062029060; 51°02′08″N 0°25′56″E	Originally a U-plan 16 th century house. Crosswings linked in the early 18th century by a range with a Georgian brick front forming a courtyard. In the courtyard 19th century additions .	1222449	Pashley Manor More images	Q17535028
Haere Mai and Lagrance	II	1, London Road			13 May 1987	TQ7157931457; 51°03′25″N 0°26′49″E		1274586	Upload Photo	Q26564239
Former Colvin Bros. Filling Station	II	4, London Road			11 October 2012	TQ7150531275; 51°03′19″N 0°26′45″E		1408523	Upload Photo	Q26676016
Flimwell Lodge	II	London Road			13 May 1987	TQ7160331541; 51°03′27″N 0°26′50″E		1222454	Upload Photo	Q26516786
Midsummer Cottage	II	London Road			13 May 1987	TQ7149931240; 51°03′18″N 0°26′44″E		1237620	Upload Photo	Q26530746
Numbers 1 and 2 Flimwell Place	II	London Road			13 May 1987	TQ7154931367; 51°03′22″N 0°26′47″E		1222453	Upload Photo	Q26516785
Chestnut House	II	Lower Platts			13 May 1987	TQ6939630106; 51°02′43″N 0°24′55″E		1222455	Upload Photo	Q26516787
Ellmans Pit	II	Lower Platts			13 May 1987	TQ6942930106; 51°02′43″N 0°24′56″E		1274632	Upload Photo	Q26564281
Little Croft Wayside	II	Lymden Lane			13 May 1987	TQ6671728572; 51°01′56″N 0°22′35″E		1222450	Upload Photo	Q26516782
Lymden Farmhouse	II	Lymden Lane			13 May 1987	TQ6713229172; 51°02′15″N 0°22′57″E		1222452	Upload Photo	Q26516784
1-3, Pickfords Lane	II	1-3, Pickfords Lane			13 May 1987	TQ6894730270; 51°02′49″N 0°24′32″E		1274556	1-3, Pickfords Lane More images	Q26564210
Downash House	II	Rosmary Lane			13 May 1987	TQ7016731298; 51°03′21″N 0°25′36″E		1222456	Upload Photo	Q26516788
Ketleys	II	Rosmary Lane			13 May 1987	TQ7022231582; 51°03′30″N 0°25′39″E		1237640	Upload Photo	Q26530763
1 and 2, St Mary's Lane	II	1 and 2, St Mary's Lane			13 May 1987	TQ6888330150; 51°02′45″N 0°24′28″E		1222457	1 and 2, St Mary's Lane More images	Q26516789
3 and 4, St Mary's Lane	II	3 and 4, St Mary's Lane			13 May 1987	TQ6890630149; 51°02′45″N 0°24′29″E		1237642	3 and 4, St Mary's Lane More images	Q26530765
Fairview Cottage	II	St Mary's Lane			13 May 1987	TQ6896730151; 51°02′45″N 0°24′33″E		1237645	Fairview Cottage More images	Q26530768
Outbuilding in the Grounds of the Long House to the South West of the House	II	St Mary's Lane			23 December 1986	TQ6898430150; 51°02′45″N 0°24′33″E		1222444	Outbuilding in the Grounds of the Long House to the South West of the House More images	Q26516777
Watmans	II	St Mary's Lane			13 May 1987	TQ6894230169; 51°02′46″N 0°24′31″E		1222458	Watmans More images	Q26516790
White Cottage	II	St Mary's Lane			13 May 1987	TQ6900330148; 51°02′45″N 0°24′34″E		1274558	White Cottage More images	Q26564212
Woodbine Villa	II	St Mary's Lane			13 May 1987	TQ6894030183; 51°02′46″N 0°24′31″E		1274633	Woodbine Villa More images	Q26564282
1, 2, 3 and 4, Station Road	II	1, 2, 3 and 4, Station Road			13 May 1987	TQ6666228520; 51°01′55″N 0°22′32″E		1237648	Upload Photo	Q26530771
Barn at Stonegate Farm to the North West of the Farmhouse	II	Station Road			13 May 1987	TQ6667928487; 51°01′54″N 0°22′32″E		1237649	Upload Photo	Q26530772
Church of St Peter	II	Station Road			15 November 2010	TQ6661828346; 51°01′49″N 0°22′29″E		1396260	Upload Photo	Q26675058
Little Hammerden	II	Station Road			13 May 1987	TQ6642227677; 51°01′28″N 0°22′18″E		1237650	Upload Photo	Q26530773
Stonegate Farmhouse	II	Station Road			13 May 1987	TQ6671828479; 51°01′53″N 0°22′34″E		1274560	Upload Photo	Q26564214
Witherenden Farmhouse	II	Station Road			3 August 1961	TQ6526227059; 51°01′09″N 0°21′17″E		1237693	Upload Photo	Q26530812
Witherenden Mill	II	Station Road			13 May 1987	TQ6536126905; 51°01′04″N 0°21′22″E		1274562	Upload Photo	Q26564215
K6 Telephone Kiosk Opposite Duke of York Pub	II	The Square			1 October 1987	TQ6890430232; 51°02′48″N 0°24′30″E		1274164	K6 Telephone Kiosk Opposite Duke of York Pub More images	Q26563850
Ticehurst War Memorial and Second World War Commemorative Stone	II	The Square			26 September 2018	TQ6891530226; 51°02′48″N 0°24′30″E		1458898	Ticehurst War Memorial and Second World War Commemorative Stone More images	Q56809337
Walter's Farmhouse	II	Tinker's Lane			13 May 1987	TQ6902131171; 51°03′18″N 0°24′37″E		1274514	Upload Photo	Q26564170
Broom House	II	1 and 2, Union Street			13 May 1987	TQ7067931196; 51°03′17″N 0°26′02″E		1274571	Upload Photo	Q26564224
Barn at Quedley to the East of the Farmhouse	II	Union Street			13 May 1987	TQ7089930730; 51°03′02″N 0°26′13″E		1237715	Upload Photo	Q26530833
Quedley	II	Union Street			13 May 1987	TQ7085130731; 51°03′02″N 0°26′10″E		1274568	Upload Photo	Q26564221
Yew Tree Cottage	II	Union Street			13 May 1987	TQ7087431202; 51°03′17″N 0°26′12″E		1237668	Upload Photo	Q26530790
4 and 5, Upper Platt	II	4 and 5, Upper Platts			13 May 1987	TQ6938830074; 51°02′42″N 0°24′54″E		1237671	Upload Photo	Q26530792
Lower Tollgate	II	Upper Platts			13 May 1987	TQ6937530079; 51°02′42″N 0°24′53″E		1274533	Upload Photo	Q26564187
Singehurst	II	Upper Platts			13 May 1987	TQ6943530027; 51°02′41″N 0°24′56″E		1274534	Upload Photo	Q26564188
The Homestead, Meadow Cottage, Caperer's Cottage and Breckles	II	Upper Platts			13 May 1987	TQ6957130043; 51°02′41″N 0°25′03″E		1237672	Upload Photo	Q26530793
The Ticehurst Institute	II	Upper Platts			13 May 1987	TQ6929930068; 51°02′42″N 0°24′50″E		1237670	Upload Photo	Q26530791
Barn to the South West of Broomden and to the South of Broomden Oast	II	Vineyard Lane			13 May 1987	TQ6780930669; 51°03′03″N 0°23′34″E		1274517	Upload Photo	Q26564173
Broomden	II	Vineyard Lane			13 May 1987	TQ6786730723; 51°03′05″N 0°23′37″E		1237673	Upload Photo	Q26530794
Gravel Pit	II	Wadhurst Road			13 May 1987	TQ6846530477; 51°02′56″N 0°24′07″E		1237719	Upload Photo	Q26530837
Highlands	II	Wadhurst Road			3 August 1961	TQ6802330468; 51°02′56″N 0°23′45″E		1274536	Upload Photo	Q26564190
Little Whiligh	II	Wadhurst Road			13 May 1987	TQ6573431728; 51°03′39″N 0°21′49″E		1274537	Upload Photo	Q26564191
Shovers Green House	II	Wadhurst Road			13 May 1987	TQ6539830416; 51°02′57″N 0°21′30″E		1237742	Upload Photo	Q26530854
The Old Farmhouse	II	Wadhurst Road			13 May 1987	TQ6672930215; 51°02′50″N 0°22′38″E		1237728	Upload Photo	Q26680620
The Rosary	II	Wadhurst Road			13 May 1987	TQ6698830228; 51°02′50″N 0°22′51″E		1237724	Upload Photo	Q26530841
The Stables at Whiligh to the North West of the House	II	Wadhurst Road			13 May 1987	TQ6565131306; 51°03′26″N 0°21′44″E		1237739	Upload Photo	Q26530851
Ticehurst House Private Clinic	II	Wadhurst Road			13 May 1987	TQ6820730536; 51°02′58″N 0°23′54″E		1237674	Upload Photo	Q26530795
Tollgate	II	Wadhurst Road			13 May 1987	TQ6857330425; 51°02′54″N 0°24′13″E		1274535	Upload Photo	Q26564189
Wallcrouch Farmhouse	II	Wadhurst Road			13 May 1987	TQ6691830186; 51°02′48″N 0°22′48″E		1237675	Upload Photo	Q26530796
Whiligh and Courthopes	II*	Wadhurst Road			3 August 1961	TQ6566531255; 51°03′24″N 0°21′45″E		1237733	Upload Photo	Q17556054
Granary About 60 Metres South East of Wardsbrook Farmhouse	II	Wardensbrook Road			25 May 1988	TQ6878429081; 51°02′11″N 0°24′21″E		1274217	Upload Photo	Q26563898
Chessons Cottages	II	1 and 2, Ward's Lane			13 May 1987	TQ6670531923; 51°03′45″N 0°22′39″E		1274498	Upload Photo	Q26564158
Barn at Chessons Farm to the South West of the Farmhouse	II	Ward's Lane			13 May 1987	TQ6667631915; 51°03′45″N 0°22′38″E		1237754	Upload Photo	Q26530864
Bryant's Farmhouse	II	Ward's Lane			13 May 1987	TQ6665332858; 51°04′15″N 0°22′38″E		1237755	Upload Photo	Q26530865
Chessons Farmhouse	II	Ward's Lane			13 May 1987	TQ6687732107; 51°03′51″N 0°22′49″E		1274497	Upload Photo	Q26564157
Holbeam Wood	II	Ward's Lane			13 May 1987	TQ6634630773; 51°03′08″N 0°22′19″E		1274496	Upload Photo	Q26564156
Two Oasthouses and Granary at Holbeam Wood to the North West of the House	II	Ward's Lane			13 May 1987	TQ6633430807; 51°03′09″N 0°22′19″E		1237753	Upload Photo	Q26530863
Major and Minor Barns Immediately East North East of Wardsbrook Farmhouse	II	Wardsbrook Road			25 May 1988	TQ6875329108; 51°02′12″N 0°24′20″E		1238516	Upload Photo	Q26531574
Outbuilding 5 Yards South East of Wardsbrook Farmhouse	II	Wardsbrook Road			13 May 1987	TQ6874029090; 51°02′11″N 0°24′19″E		1237752	Upload Photo	Q26530862
Parsonage Farmhouse	II	Wardsbrook Road			13 May 1987	TQ6880629552; 51°02′26″N 0°24′23″E		1237676	Upload Photo	Q26530797
The Old Mill	II	Wardsbrook Road			13 May 1987	TQ6867829104; 51°02′12″N 0°24′16″E		1274495	Upload Photo	Q26564155
Wardsbrook Farmhouse	II*	Wardsbrook Road			3 August 1961	TQ6872429102; 51°02′11″N 0°24′18″E		1237751	Upload Photo	Q17556060
April Cottage Ebeneezer Cottage Prospect Cottage	II				13 May 1987	TQ6854131137; 51°03′17″N 0°24′12″E		1237653	Upload Photo	Q26530776
Bakers and Strakes Farmhouse	II				3 August 1961	TQ6833031466; 51°03′28″N 0°24′02″E		1237656	Upload Photo	Q26530779
Corner Cottage Folly Cottage	II				13 May 1987	TQ6862531277; 51°03′22″N 0°24′17″E		1237710	Upload Photo	Q26530829
Gabriel Cottages, 1 and 2	II				13 May 1987	TQ6854531147; 51°03′18″N 0°24′13″E		1274549	Upload Photo	Q26564203
Prospect Cottage	II				13 May 1987	TQ6856331194; 51°03′19″N 0°24′14″E		1237654	Upload Photo	Q26530777
The Bell Hotel	II				13 May 1987	TQ6890430265; 51°02′49″N 0°24′30″E		1222567	The Bell Hotel More images	Q26516890
Upper Hazelhurst Farmhouse	II				13 May 1987	TQ6845332058; 51°03′47″N 0°24′09″E		1237657	Upload Photo	Q26530780

== See also ==
- Grade I listed buildings in East Sussex
- Grade II* listed buildings in Rother

== Sources ==
- Antram, Nicholas; Pevsner, Nikolaus (2012) [1965], Sussex: East, The Buildings of England, New Haven and London: Yale University Press, ISBN 978-0-300-18473-0
