= Charles Todhunter =

British civil servant

Sir Charles Todhunter KCSI

Governor of Madras (acting)
- In office 12 April 1924 – 14 April 1924
- Governor-General: Rufus Isaacs, 1st Marquess of Reading
- Premier: Raja of Panagal
- Preceded by: Freeman Freeman-Thomas, 1st Marquess of Willingdon
- Succeeded by: George Goschen, 2nd Viscount Goschen

Personal details
- Born: 16 February 1869
- Died: 1 March 1949 (aged 80)
- Profession: Civil servant

Sir Charles George Todhunter KCSI (16 February 1869 – 1 March 1949) was a British civil servant in British India.

Todhunter was of New Zealand background and educated in England at Aldenham School and King's College, Cambridge. He joined the Indian Civil Service in 1888 and was assigned to the Madras Presidency.

He was Deputy Commissioner for salt, abkari (excise duties) and customs, and then Secretary of the Board of Revenue. He was then responsible for the reorganisation of customs and excise arrangements in much of India and was then appointed Director-General of Excise and Salt of the Government of India.

Returning to Madras, he was successively a member of the Board of Revenue, Chief Secretary to the Government, and a member of the Governor's Executive Council. From 1924 he was president of the Indian Taxation Inquiry Committee. On his retirement from the ICS he became private secretary to the Maharaja of Mysore, holding the post for sixteen years until the maharaja's death in 1940, when he settled down on his farm in the Kenjari district of Mysore State.

He was appointed Companion of the Order of the Star of India (CSI) in the 1920 New Year Honours and Knight Commander of the Order of the Star of India (KCSI) in the 1921 Birthday Honours.
