= Seacox Heath =

House in Ticehurst, East Sussex, England

Coordinates: 51.0493°N 0.4662°E

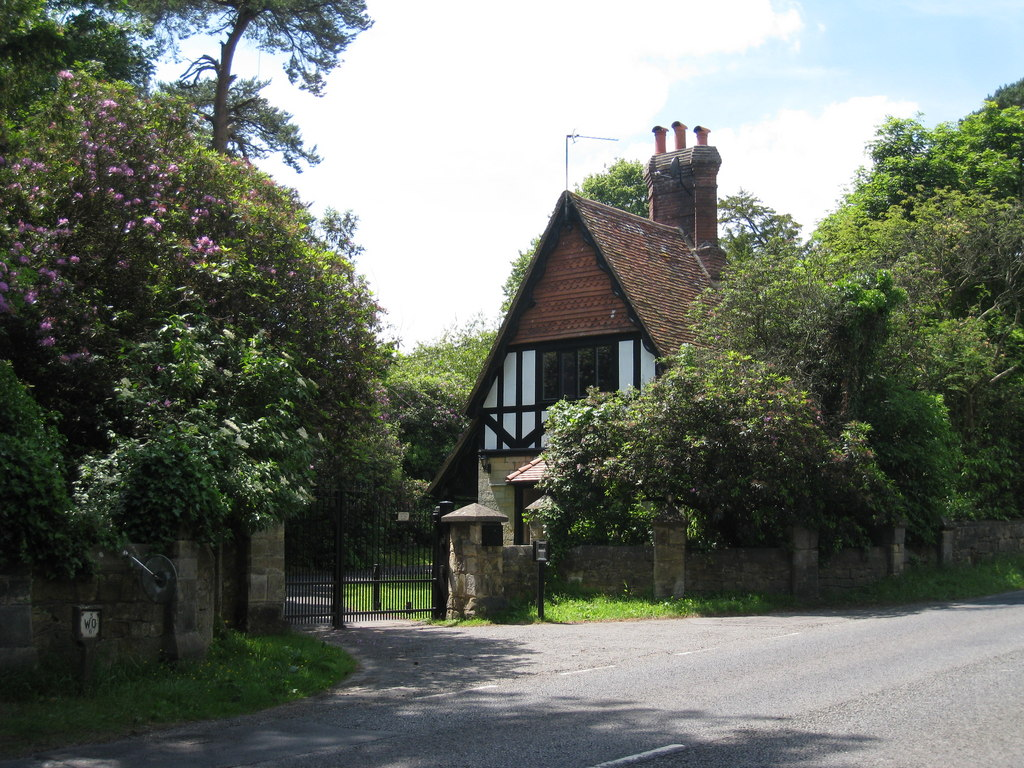
The lodge to Seacox Heath in 2010

Seacox Heath is a house in the village of Flimwell in East Sussex, England. It is owned by the Russian government, and is used as a weekend retreat by the staff of their embassy in London.

It was built in 1871 to designs by the architects Richard Carpenter and William Slater. The house has been listed Grade II on the National Heritage List for England (NHLE) since May 1987. The NHLE listing described it as a "Tall mansion in the style of a French chateau", set over three storeys. The lodge building to the house was separately listed in October 1996.

In January 1921 Rudyard Kipling met Emir Faisal of the Hejaz at the house. Kipling asked Faisal so many questions about the breeds of camels in Arabia that Faisal thought that Kipling had mistaken him for a camel trader.

For several decades, the house was owned by the politician George Goschen, 2nd Viscount Goschen. In October 1946 the house and 83 acres of the estate were bought by the Soviet government as a retreat for its diplomatic staff from their embassy. Shortly before the sale, 630 acres of the estate had been sold by Lord Goschen. By 1999 the house and estate had tennis courts and a football pitch. In November 1999 dogs from the house were suspected of killing more than 50 sheep that had roamed in fields near the house in Lamberhurst.

In 2022 it was reported that the British Government was considering seizing the house and gifting it to the Ukrainian government as compensation for the 2022 Russian invasion of Ukraine. Its diplomatic status was withdrawn by the British government in 2024.

== See also ==
- Embassy of Russia, London
