= George Goschen, 2nd Viscount Goschen =

British politician (1866–1952)

The Right Honourable The Viscount Goschen GCSI GCIE CBE VD KStJ PC
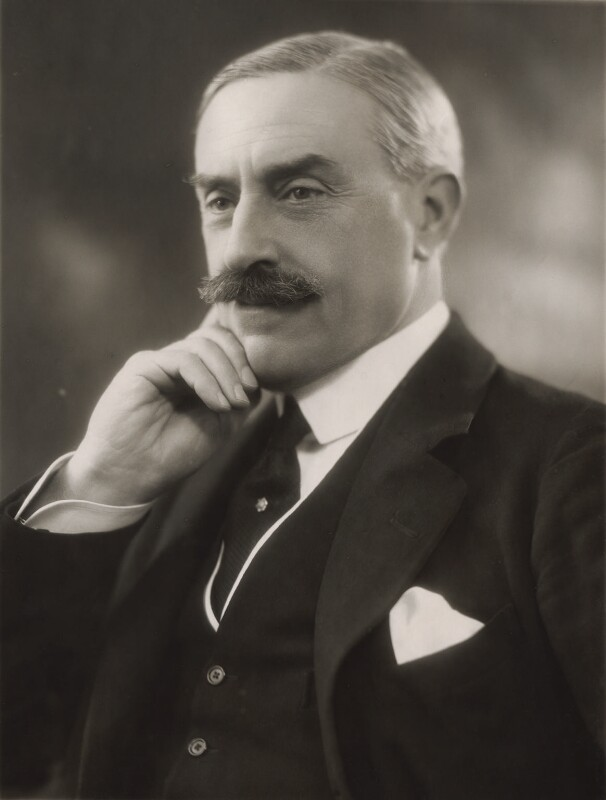
- Lord Goschen in 1923

Governor of Madras Presidency
- In office 14 April 1924 – 29 June 1929
- Governors-General: The Marquess of Reading; The Earl of Halifax
- Premier: Raja of Panagal, P. Subbarayan
- Preceded by: Sir Charles Todhunter
- Succeeded by: Sir Norman Majoribanks

Parliamentary Secretary to the Board of Agriculture and Fisheries
- In office 26 March 1918 – 18 June 1918
- Monarch: George V
- Prime Minister: David Lloyd George
- Preceded by: The Duke of Marlborough
- Succeeded by: The Lord Clinton

Member of the House of Lords
- Lord Temporal
- In office 7 February 1907 – 24 July 1952
- Preceded by: The 1st Viscount Goschen
- Succeeded by: The 3rd Viscount Goschen

Member of Parliament for East Grinstead
- In office 18 July 1895 – 25 January 1906
- Preceded by: Alfred Gathorne-Hardy
- Succeeded by: Charles Corbett

Personal details
- Born: 15 October 1866 Hastings, Sussex, England
- Died: 24 July 1952 (aged 85) Royal Tunbridge Wells, Kent, England
- Party: Conservative
- Spouse: Lady Margaret Gathorne-Hardy (m. 1893; died 1943)
- Children: 3
- Parent(s): George Goschen, 1st Viscount Goschen; Lucy Dalley
- Education: Rugby School
- Alma mater: Balliol College, Oxford

George Joachim Goschen, 2nd Viscount Goschen (15 October 1866 – 24 July 1952), was a British Conservative politician who served as Governor of Madras from 1924 to 1929, and acting Viceroy of India from 1929 to 1931.

Goschen was the son of prominent Conservative (formerly Liberal and Liberal Unionist) politician and Chancellor of the Exchequer, George Goschen, 1st Viscount Goschen. He had his early education in the United Kingdom and served as Secretary to Victor Child Villiers, 7th Earl of Jersey, the Governor of New South Wales in Australia from 1890 to 1892. In 1895 and 1900, he was elected to the House of Commons from East Grinstead and served as a Member of Parliament from 1895 to 1906 and as the Parliamentary Secretary to the Board of Agriculture and Fisheries from March to June 1918. In 1924, he was appointed Governor of Madras Presidency, India, and served there from 1924 to 1929. He acted as the Viceroy of India in place of Edward Wood, 1st Earl of Halifax, from 1929 to 1931. He died in 1952 at the age of 85.

Goschen was knighted the grace of Order of Saint John in 1921 and made a Knight Grand Commander of Order of the Star of India in March 1924. He was also a member of the Privy Council of the United Kingdom.

== Early life and family ==
The Honourable George Joachim Goschen, 1895

Goschen was born the eldest son of George Joachim Goschen, 1st Viscount Goschen, and his wife Lucy Dalley (1830–1898), daughter of John Dalley, on 15 October 1866 at St Leonards-on-Sea, Hastings. The Goschen family was eminent in both Germany and Britain; indeed, his grandfather, Wilhelm Heinrich Göschen, who settled in England in 1814 during the Napoleonic wars, was co-founder of the merchant banking firm Frühling & Göschen and the son of publisher Georg Joachim Göschen, of Leipzig, Kingdom of Saxony. He was educated at Rugby School, and Balliol College, Oxford.

Goschen fell in love with Lady Margaret Evelyn Gathorne-Hardy, the youngest daughter the Earl of Cranbrook, who was eight years older than he was, but still desired to marry her. His father, the 1st Viscount, was, however, strongly opposed to their marriage and used his influence to get an appointment for his son as a Private Secretary to Lord Jersey, the Governor of New South Wales in Australia. Goschen calmly obeyed his father's orders and worked in Australia from 1890 to 1892. On his return from Australia, however, he married Margaret in 1893.

He was a Major in the 2nd Volunteer Battalion of The Buffs (East Kent Regiment), and from February 1901 served as an aide-de-camp (ADC) to Lord Roberts, Commander-in-Chief during the Second Boer War. He fought in the First World War as Commandant of the 2nd/5th Battalion, East Kent Regiment.

== Member of Parliament for East Grinstead ==
Goschen entered politics early in life. In 1895, he was elected to the House of Commons of the United Kingdom as a Conservative for the then East Grinstead constituency in Sussex and served as a member of parliament for two terms from 18 July 1895 to 25 January 1906. In July 1913, he was elected Chairman of the Council of the Corporation of Foreign Bondholders which comprised some of the leading financiers in England. Goschen served as the Parliamentary Secretary to the Board of Agriculture and Fisheries from March to June 1918.

Goschen succeeded his father as Viscount Goschen on the latter's death on 7 February 1907. In December 1910, he was appointed a deputy lieutenant (DL) of Kent. He was also appointed justice of the peace (JP) for Sussex.

== Governor of Madras ==
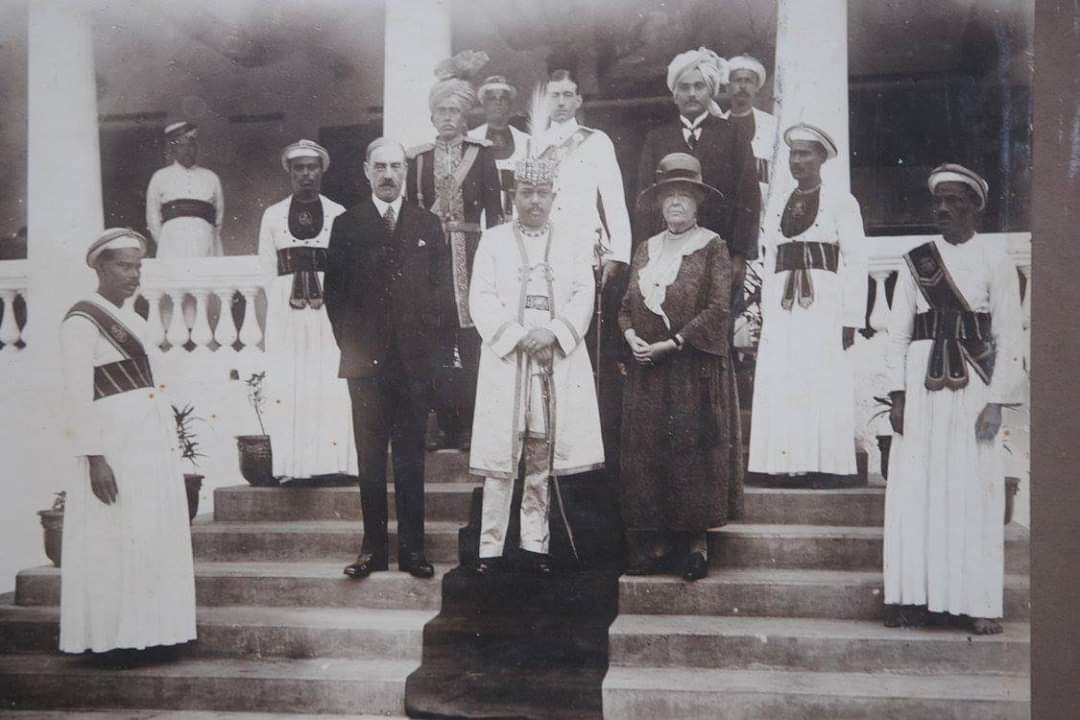
Lord and Lady Goschen with the Maharaja of Jeypore

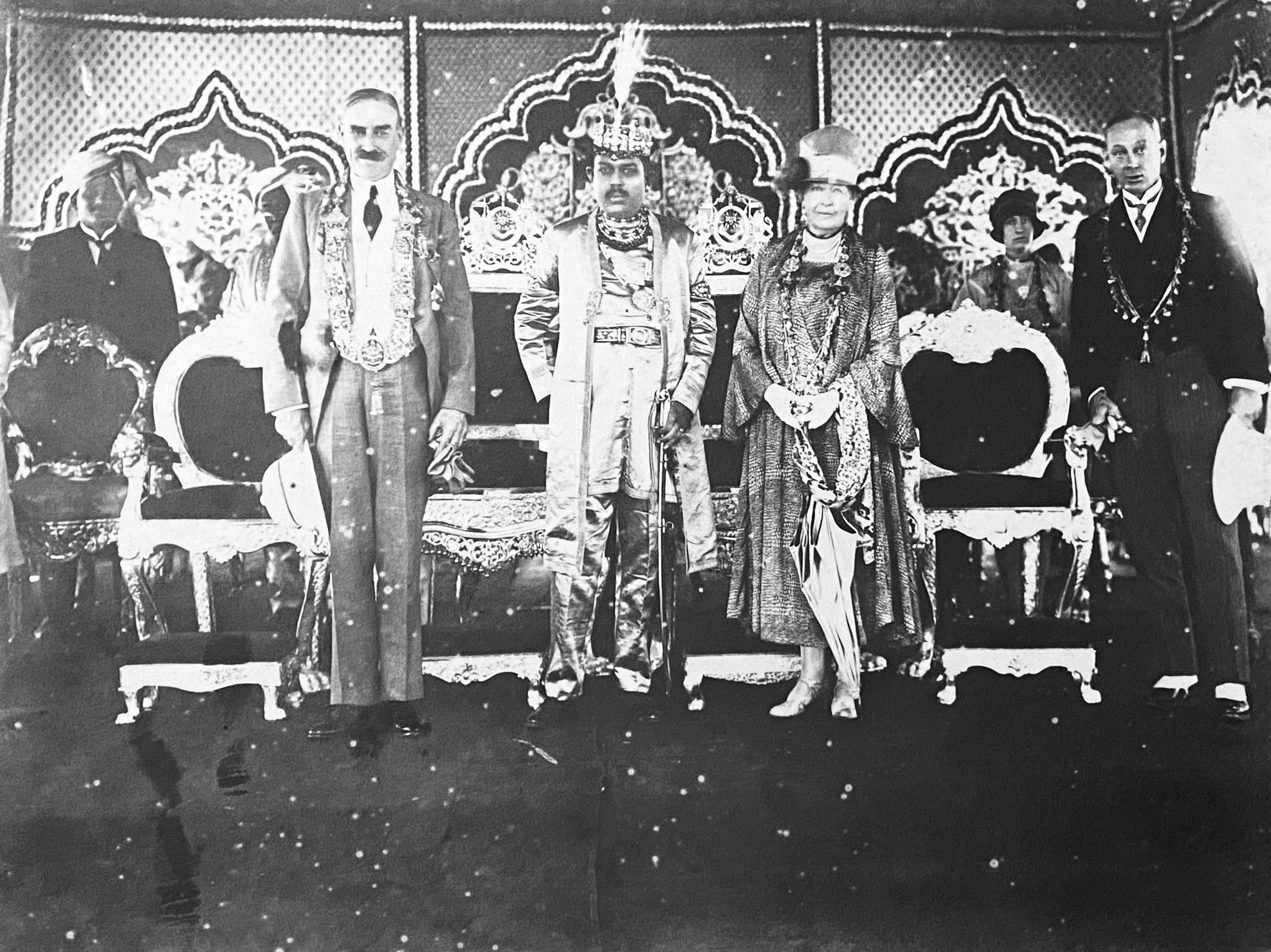
Lord Goschen, Ram Chandra Dev IV, Maharaja of Jeypore and Lady Goschen

Goschen was appointed Governor of Madras in 1924 and he arrived at Madras in May 1924 to take charge. Goschen was awarded the Order of the Star of India (GCSI) in March 1924.

The Madras Presidency Radio Club started a radio transmission service in Madras, the first in the city, in 1924, under Goschen's patronage. This service lasted from 1924 to 1927. Goschen was also involved in the early stages of the Loyola College, Chennai, and presided over its first college day in 1928. The Children's Hospital at Mangalore was refurbished and renamed as Lady Goschen Hospital while the SPG College, Trichinopoly, was renamed as Bishop Heber College and Goschen presided over its diamond jubilee celebrations in 1926.

In November 1926, the Pykara hydroelectric project across the Moyar river was conceived by Lord Goschen.

Goschen maintained friendly relations with the Raja of Panagal who was the Chief Minister of Madras Presidency. However, in the 1926 elections to the Madras Legislative Assembly, the Justice Party, to which the Raja belonged, was reduced to a minority winning only 21 out of 98 seats in the assembly. The Raja stepped down as Chief Minister and handed over his resignation to the Governor. Goschen invited S. Srinivasa Iyengar, the leader of the Swarajya Party which had won a majority, to form the government, but he refused as the acceptance of public posts would defeat the very purpose of the Swarajists to disrupt the working of the dyarchy. Goschen, therefore, made an independent, P. Subbarayan, the Chief Minister, and nominated 34 members to the council to support him. As the government was set up by Goschen and all the members nominated by him, it functioned more or less like a puppet government.

Subbarayan's government was the subject of much controversy and survived a no-confidence motion on 23 August 1927. Its position became more precarious when the Simon Commission arrived in India in 1928. The Swarajya Party moved a resolution exhorting a boycott of the commission and the Justice Party supported them. The motion was passed 65 to 50 with both of Subbarayan's ministers in favour of a boycott. Subbarayan responded by resigning his post. Goschen, however, mediated a settlement with the Raja of Panagal and appointed a Justice Party nominee, Krishnan Nair to the Executive Council. The Justice Party, immediately, withdrew their support to the resolution and welcomed the commission. Just before his retirement from active politics in 1925, the Justice Party insisted upon a gift of land to their leader Theagaroya Chetty from the Madras government but Goschen staunchly refused to make the grant. A block named "Goschen Block" was constructed in the Government Estate (presently Omandurar Estate) in Mount Road. This had a number of houses allotted to Government officials and later to MLAs (P. Kakkan, Minister in the Kamaraj Government, lived in one). Goschen Block was demolished when construction of the new Assembly building (now a hospital) started.

During his tenure, the Yanam-Neelapalli bridge was constructed. Yanam was then a French colony. He laid the foundation stone for the bridge on 10 December 1927.

== Acting Viceroy of India ==
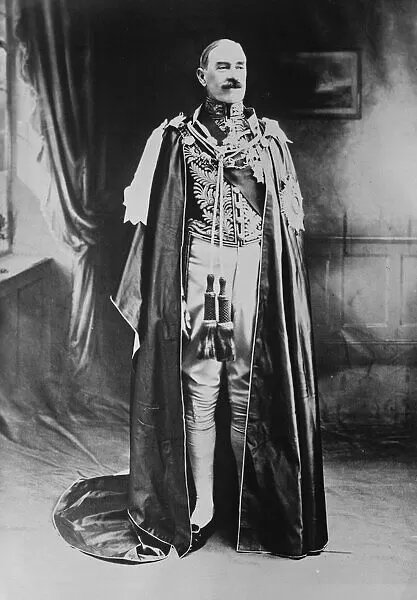
Lord Goschen, as Viceroy of India

Lord Irwin, the Viceroy of India, left for London on leave in June 1929. He appointed Goschen to act as Viceroy and Governor-General during his absence, which lasted until November. He acted when Lord Irwin was periodically absent between 1929 and 1931. Indeed, as Irwin's deputy, he was acting Viceroy several further times during Irwin's tenure, such as in February 1930, when Irwin left India, and again in 1931 when he was overseeing the beginning of the Round Table conferences in Britain.

Lord Goschen's tenure as Governor of Madras and then acting Viceroy was a period of lavish splendour. He partook in tiger hunting and horse racing, and hosted large, luxurious banquets and high-society weddings, such as that of his daughter to his ADC.

George Goschen's father, the 1st Viscount, had been offered the Viceroyalty of India by British Liberal Prime Minister William Ewart Gladstone in 1880, but had declined the offer.

== Later life ==
In 1933, a group which called itself the Union of Britain and India was formed in London. This group was in favour of an Indian federation. Goschen served as the first President of the union. Goschen also wrote a chapter titled "Provincial Autonomy" in the 1934 book India from a Back Bench where he criticized the dyarchy system regarding it as a failure based on his experience as an administrator in India.

From this point of view, the result has been disappointing; for Diarchy has inculcated a spirit of irresponsibility than responsibility. The Ministers have to rely for support on the official bloc in the Councils (about a quarter of the whole number of members), and for this reason their sense of responsibility to the elected members is "blurred", and the elected members regard them as to some extent suspect.
The Ministers are not responsible for "Law and Order" or Finance. In other words, they have not to find the money for their departments and are consequently handicapped in starting new schemes: and they are not responsible for the effect of their administration. They thus stand to lose their credit and escape the blame that fuller responsible would award them.

== Personal life ==
On 26 January 1893, at Benenden, Kent, Lord Goschen married Lady Margaret Evelyn Gathorne-Hardy (27 May 1858 – 11 July 1943), youngest daughter of Gathorne Gathorne-Hardy, 1st Earl of Cranbrook, by his wife Jane (née Stewart-Orr). Lady Goschen gave her name to the Viscountess Goschen Government Girls (Muslim) High School in Tharanallur, Tiruchirappalli, Tamil Nadu, and to the Lady Goschen Hospital in Mangalore.

They had three children:

- Lt. Hon. George Joachim Goschen (18 November 1893 – 16 January 1916), 7th Battalion, The Buffs (East Kent Regiment); expected to succeed, but died of wounds received in action at the Siege of Kut
- Hon. Phyllis Evelyn Goschen (5 August 1895 – 27 May 1976), Lady-in-Waiting to Her Royal Highness the Princess Royal 1948–1965, married Lt Col. Francis Cecil Campbell Balfour, nephew of Prime Minister Arthur Balfour and grandson of the Duke of Argyll
- Hon. Cicely Winifred Goschen (29 April 1899 – 1980), married Maj. Melville Edward Bertram Portal, who had previously served as secretary to the Governor of Madras, in India

Goschen died on 25 July 1952 at the age of 85. His title passed to his nephew John Goschen.

Goschen owned Seacox Heath, a country house in East Sussex for many decades.

== Sources ==
- Ralhan, O. P. (2002). Encyclopaedia of Political Parties. Anmol Publications PVT. LTD. ISBN 978-81-7488-865-5.

Parliament of the United Kingdom
Preceded by Alfred Gathorne-Hardy	Member of Parliament for East Grinstead; 1895–1906	Succeeded by Charles Corbett
Political offices
Preceded by Sir Charles Todhunter (pro tempore)	Governor of Madras; 1924–1929	Succeeded by Sir Norman Majoribanks (pro tempore)
Preceded by The Lord Irwin	Viceroy of India; 1929–1931	Succeeded by The Lord Irwin
Peerage of the United Kingdom
Preceded by George Goschen	Viscount Goschen; 1907–1952	Succeeded by John Goschen
