= Tharanallur =

Tharanallur (Tamil: தாராநல்லூர்) is a neighbourhood of the city of Tiruchirappalli in Tamil Nadu, India. It is situated in the heart of the city.
